= Northside, Berkeley, California =

Neighborhood of Berkeley in Alameda County, California, United States

Northside
- Neighborhood of Berkeley
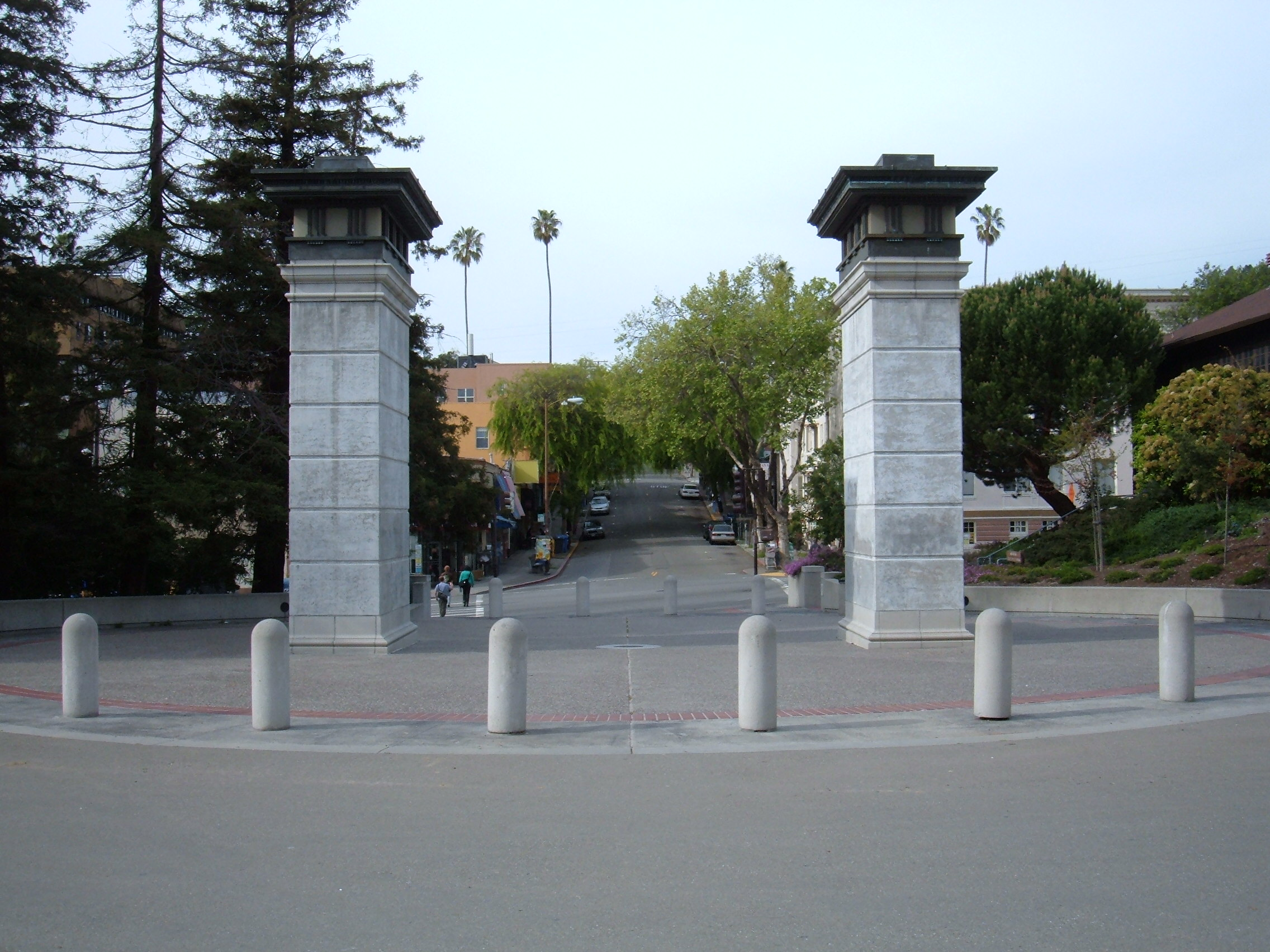
- A view of the Euclid Avenue business district, through the university's North Gate

- Location within Berkeley and the East Bay
- Coordinates: 37.8751°N 122.26018°W
- Country: United States
- State: California
- County: Alameda
- City: Berkeley

Northside is a principally residential neighborhood in Berkeley, California, located north of the University of California, Berkeley campus, east of Oxford Street, and south of Cedar Street. There is a small shopping area located at Euclid and Hearst Avenues, at the northern entrance to the university. The Graduate Theological Union is located one block west of Euclid Avenue, in an area nicknamed Holy Hill. The north fork of Strawberry Creek runs southwestward across Northside, mostly culverted under buildings and pavement, to the campus.

== History ==
Northside is the oldest residential neighborhood in the Berkeley Hills. It was subdivided in 1889 by George Phelps, who named it Daley’s Scenic Park, after the land’s previous owner, Thomas Daley. Two years later, the entire tract was purchased for $4,000 in gold by banker Frank M. Wilson, who began to sell lots for houses.

Initial development of the neighborhood was begun in the 1890s with the erection of Victorian homes. In 1895, Bernard Maybeck began designing brown-shingle houses whose steep roofs echoed the contour of the hills. Maybeck's notions on hillside building stimulated Daley's Scenic Park residents in 1898 to establish the Hillside Club, formed to protect the hills from unsightly grading and unsuitable buildings, and taking its cue from the Arts and Crafts movement. Prominent club members included Maybeck, Charles Keeler, Benjamin Ide Wheeler, and John Galen Howard.

The cradle of the architectural style known as the First Bay Region Tradition, Daley's Scenic Park lost hundreds of buildings in the September 17, 1923, Berkeley Fire. The fire survivors are concentrated in a triangle along the southeastern slopes of the tract, where one can find houses designed by Maybeck, Julia Morgan, Ernest Coxhead, and A.C. Schweinfurth — influential architects of this movement. The houses that burned in 1923, most of them clad in brown shingles, were typically replaced with stucco apartment buildings in the southern part of the fire area while many single-family homes were rebuilt in the northern parts. Hilgard Avenue is the rough boundary between these two regions on the eastern side of Euclid Avenue while the single-family home zone extends further south on the western side of Euclid Avenue.

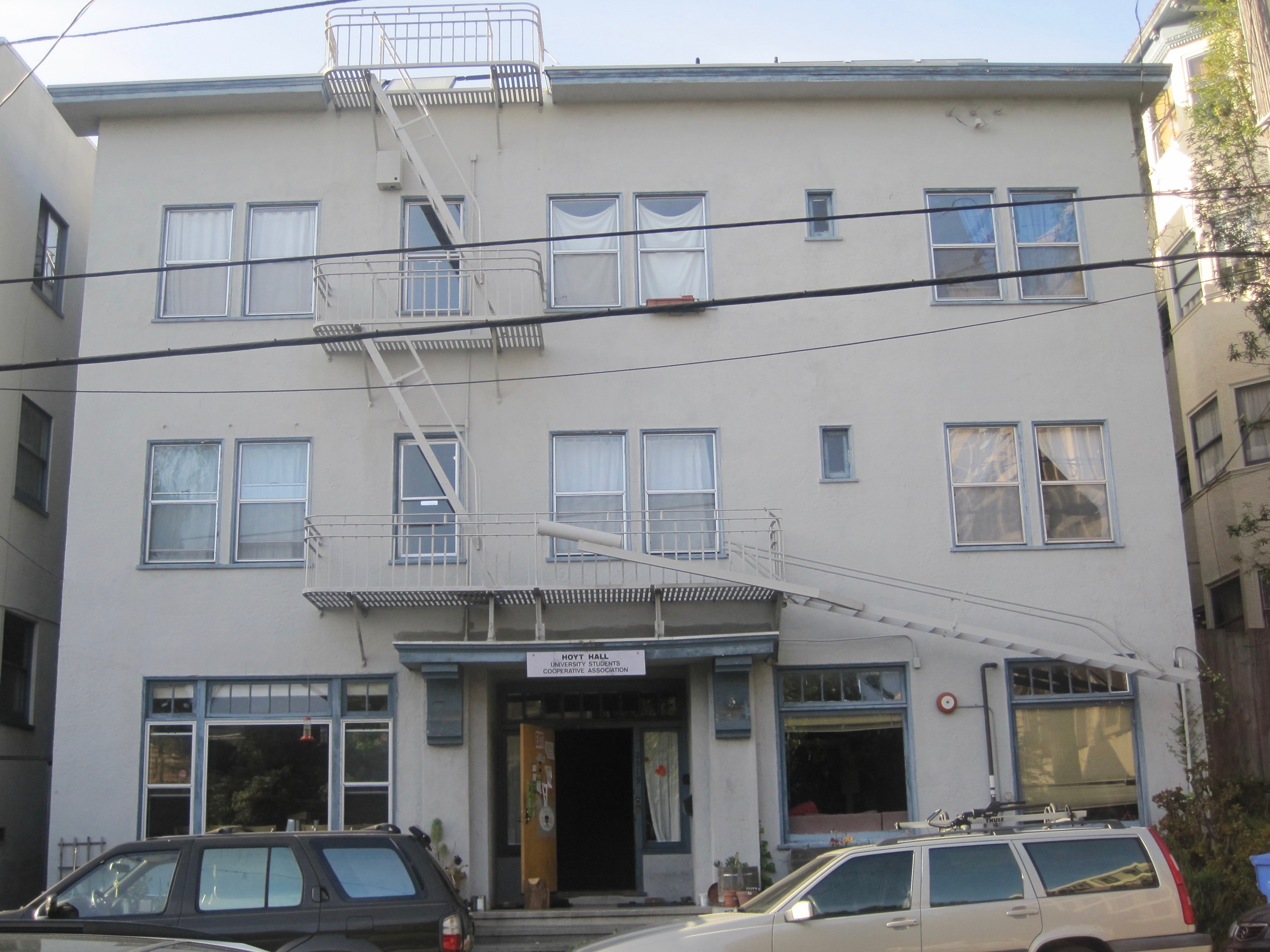
Hoyt Hall, one of the student cooperatives in Northside

Following the 1923 fire, seminaries purchased cheap land on Holy Hill. In the 1960s, they formed the Graduate Theological Union. The GTU library, which opened in the 1980s, is sited on land that had been occupied for over 80 years by Frank M. Wilson's home. Across the street, at 1820 Scenic Avenue, is the former home of Benjamin Ide Wheeler, president of the University from 1899 to 1919. Nearby stands the University's former reception hall, built by University Regent Phoebe Apperson Hearst at 1816 Scenic Avenue, and Mrs. Hearst's own house at 2368 Le Conte Avenue.

Northside was home to dozens of fraternities and sororities until the 1960s, when University policy forced them to move to the Southside. Some of the chapter houses were taken over by seminaries, several were acquired by the University Students' Cooperative Association, and many others were razed to make way for University facilities such as the two Hearst parking structures, Etcheverry Hall (1966), Foothill Student Housing (1990), and Soda Hall (1994).

== Notable landmarks ==
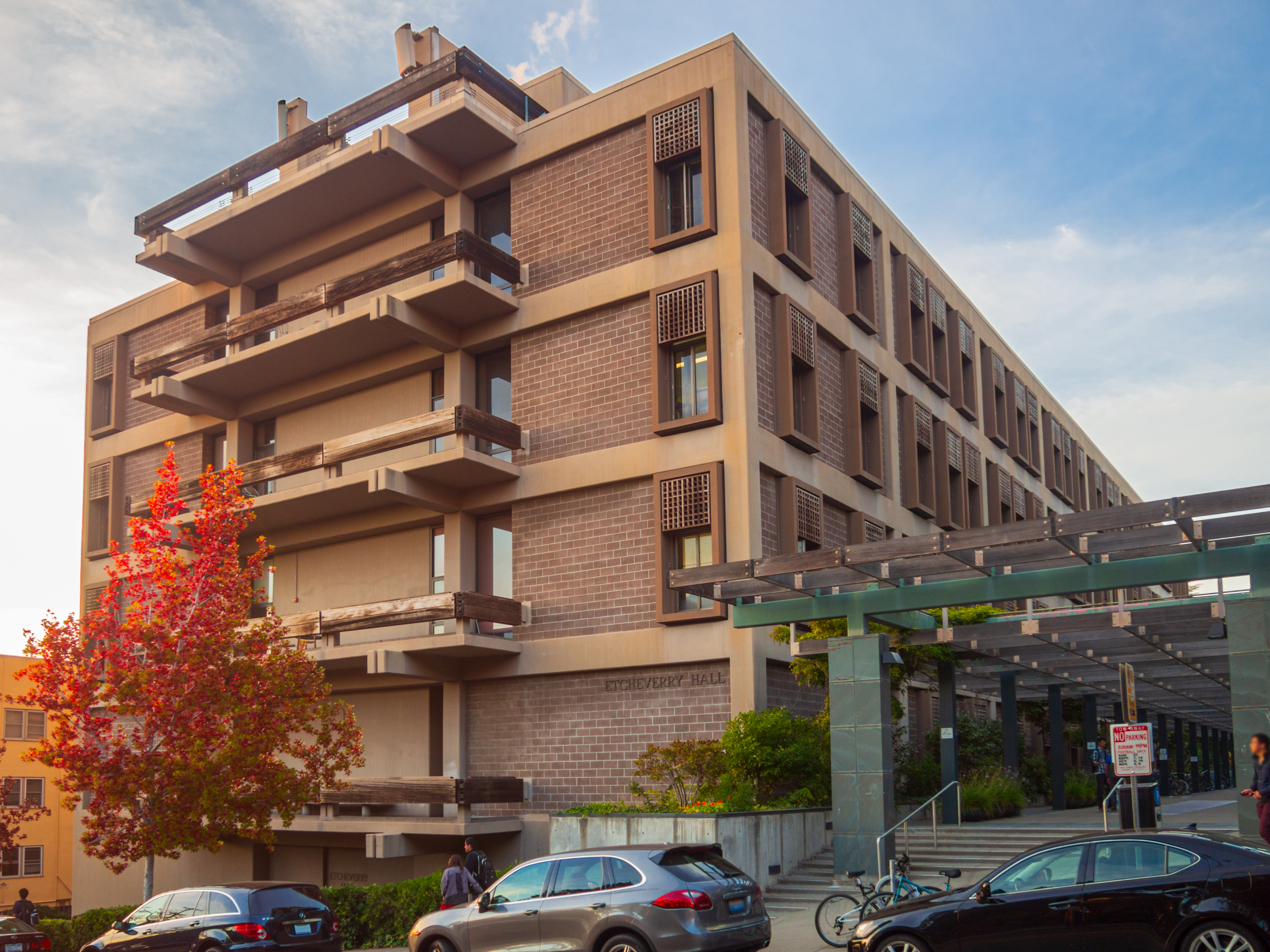
Etcheverry Hall, home of the Mechanical Engineering department

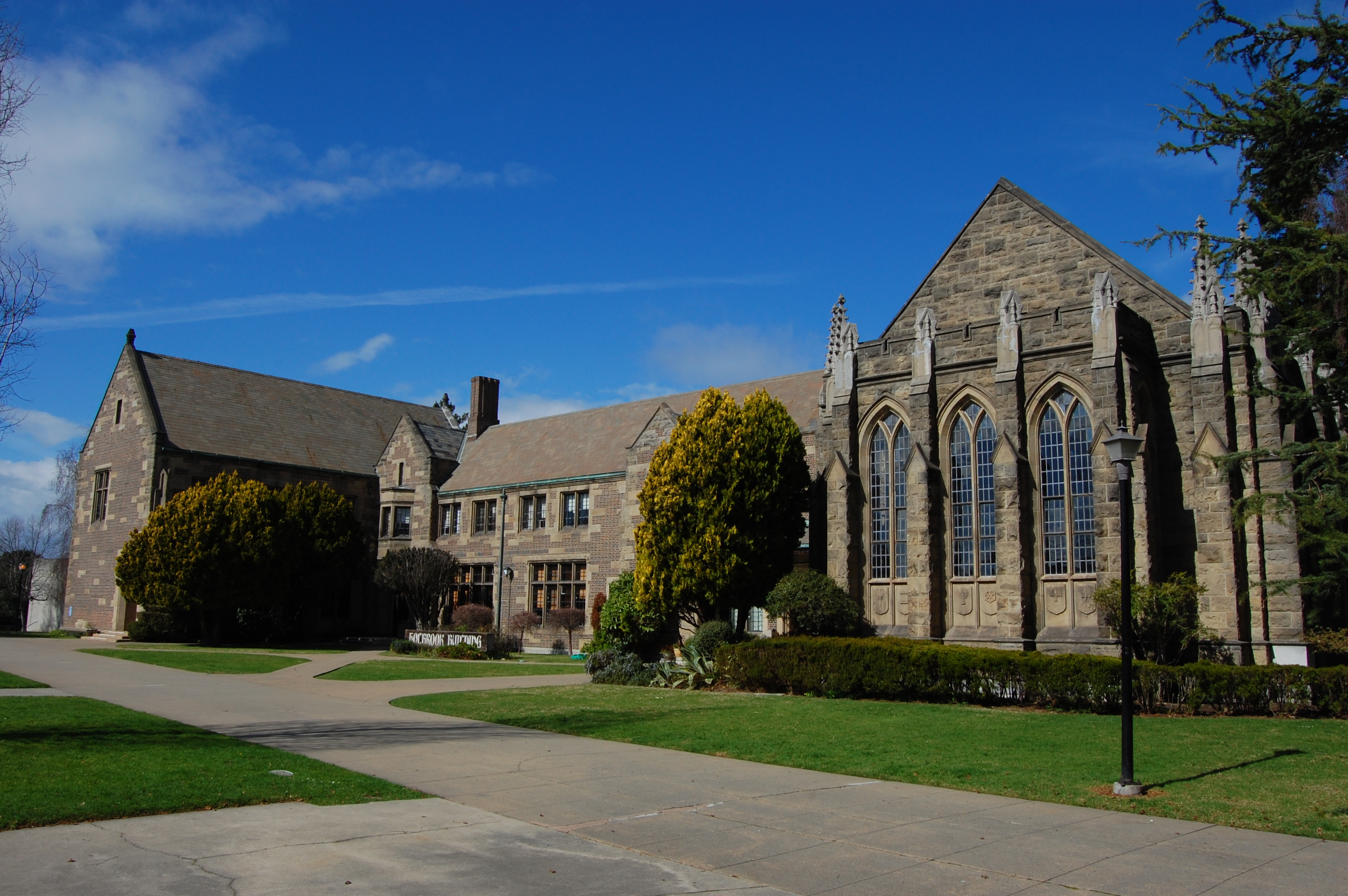
The campus of the Pacific School of Religion, one of several seminaries in the neighborhood

- The Graduate Theological Union and its various member schools, clustered around the intersection of Le Conte Avenue, Scenic Avenue, and Ridge Road.
- Nine student housing cooperatives, the largest of which are Cloyne Court Hotel and Casa Zimbabwe.

=== Designated city landmarks ===
- George Jensen House, 1675 La Loma Ave.
- Beta Theta Pi Chapter House (now Goldman School of Public Policy), 2607 Hearst Ave. at Le Roy Ave.
- Charles Keeler House & Studio, 1770 & 1736 Highland Place
- Weltevreden (now Tellefsen Hall), 1755 Le Roy Ave.
- Rev. Dr. Robert Bentley House, 2683 Le Conte Ave.
- Phi Kappa Psi Chapter House, 1770 La Loma Ave.
- Benjamin Ide Wheeler House, 1820 Scenic Ave.
- Allenoke Manor, 1777 Le Roy Ave.
- Cloyne Court Hotel, 2600 Ridge Road
- Oscar Maurer Studio, 1772 Le Roy Ave.
- Hillside Club Street Improvements in the Daley's Scenic Park Tract
- Annie's Oak, Le Roy Ave. between Le Conte Ave. and Ridge Road
- Laura Belle Marsh Kluegel House, 2667–69 Le Conte Ave.
- Euclid Apartments, 1865 Euclid Ave. at Hearst Ave.
- Phi Delta Theta Chapter House (now New Educational Development Systems], 2717 Hearst Ave.
- Theta Xi Chapter House, (now Kingman Hall) 1730 La Loma Ave.
- Hillside Club, 2286 Cedar Street
- Normandy Village, 1781–1851 Spruce Street
- Joseph W. Harris House, 2300 Le Conte Ave
- Edgar Jensen House, 1670 La Vereda Road
