= Stebbins Hall =

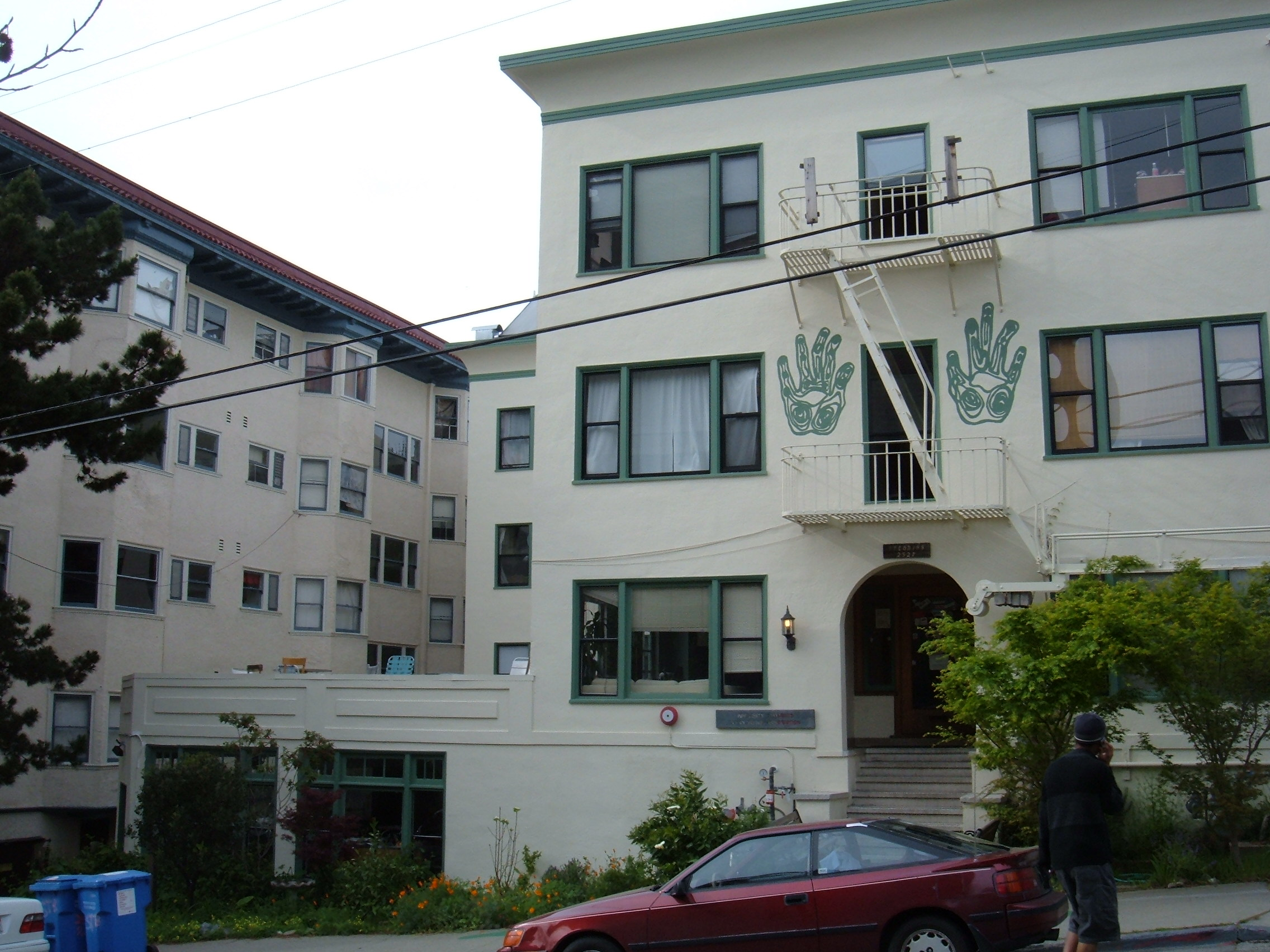
- Interactive map of Stebbins Hall

General information
- Location: 2527 Ridge Road, Berkeley, California, United States
- Coordinates: 37°52′34.46″N 122°15′33.33″W
- Named for: Lucy Ward Stebbins

Website
- Stebbins Hall

Stebbins Hall is a student housing cooperative owned by Berkeley Student Cooperative (BSC) and located at 2527 Ridge Road in Berkeley, California, on the Northside of the University of California, Berkeley campus. The house has a total occupancy of 64 residents during the school year, from late August to mid-May, and can accommodate upwards of 54 residents over the summer.

== Namesake ==
Stebbins Hall is named after Lucy Ward Stebbins, former Dean of Women at University of California, Berkeley, who was born in San Francisco in 1880. She was educated at the University of California, Berkeley and later transferred to Radcliffe College to receive her Bachelor of Arts degree. She graduated from Radcliffe College in 1902, and worked in Massachusetts as a social worker until 1910 when she took the position as Assistant Dean of Women at the University of California, Berkeley. In 1912 the former dean retired and Stebbins was appointed Dean of Women.

Stebbins served the university for thirty years. During her time in office, she increased the enrollment of women from 1,200 to 6,400 by raising money for scholarships, expanding curriculum, encouraging women to participate in student government, and creating housing opportunities. In her position, the schools of Nursing and Social Welfare were established, as well as the departments of Decorative Arts and Home Economics. She also founded the Women's Faculty Club, one of the earliest female faculty organizations to exist at a co-ed university.

Upon conferring an honorary Doctorate of Laws degree to her in 1953, President Sproul described Stebbins as “A teacher and dean...who saw clearly into the hearts and minds of students, and stimulated them by precept and example to achieve their highest potential. No single individual has contributed more than you to the personal and general welfare of the University's women, and few have touched helpfully so many phases of our University life."

Stebbins was the honored guest and speaker at the Stebbins Institute in 1942, which took place at the house.

== History ==
Stebbins Hall is located at 2527 Ridge Road, the lot of the Pierce family's original Victorian home. The Pierces were a wealthy family, responsible for many architectural landmarks in the city of Berkeley. They built the Cloyne Court Hotel, a “high-class modern apartment house” in 1904, which they later transformed into their own residence. Additionally, in 1909, the Pierces built the Treehaven apartment complex which still stands on the lot next to Stebbins Hall.

The Pierce's original house was a turreted Victorian, which they lived in as soon as they moved to the city of Berkeley in 1894. The Pierces sold the property in 1903 to move to a house up the street, and eventually to Cloyne Court. In 1927 the Pierce house was torn down to make way for Hotel Slocum. In 1936, University Student Cooperative Association (now known as Berkeley Student Cooperative) leased the building to establish Stebbins Hall, a women's cooperative boarding house. This was done with the help of the alumni of Mortar Board, the first national honor society for college senior women. Beverly Cleary was one of the first residents of Stebbins Hall and referred to her time there as "two of the most interesting years of my life." The Berkeley Student Cooperative purchased the property in 1950.

One night in 1967, a group from Cloyne then an all-male co-op, played a prank by painting footprints of a Green Giant through the campus and up to Stebbins, leaving two handprints on the front of the building. Pranksters were caught by the university and made to remove all the ones on campus, however the handprints on Stebbins remained. They were preserved and are now central part of the house's identity. The co-op became coed in 1971.

== Structural layout ==
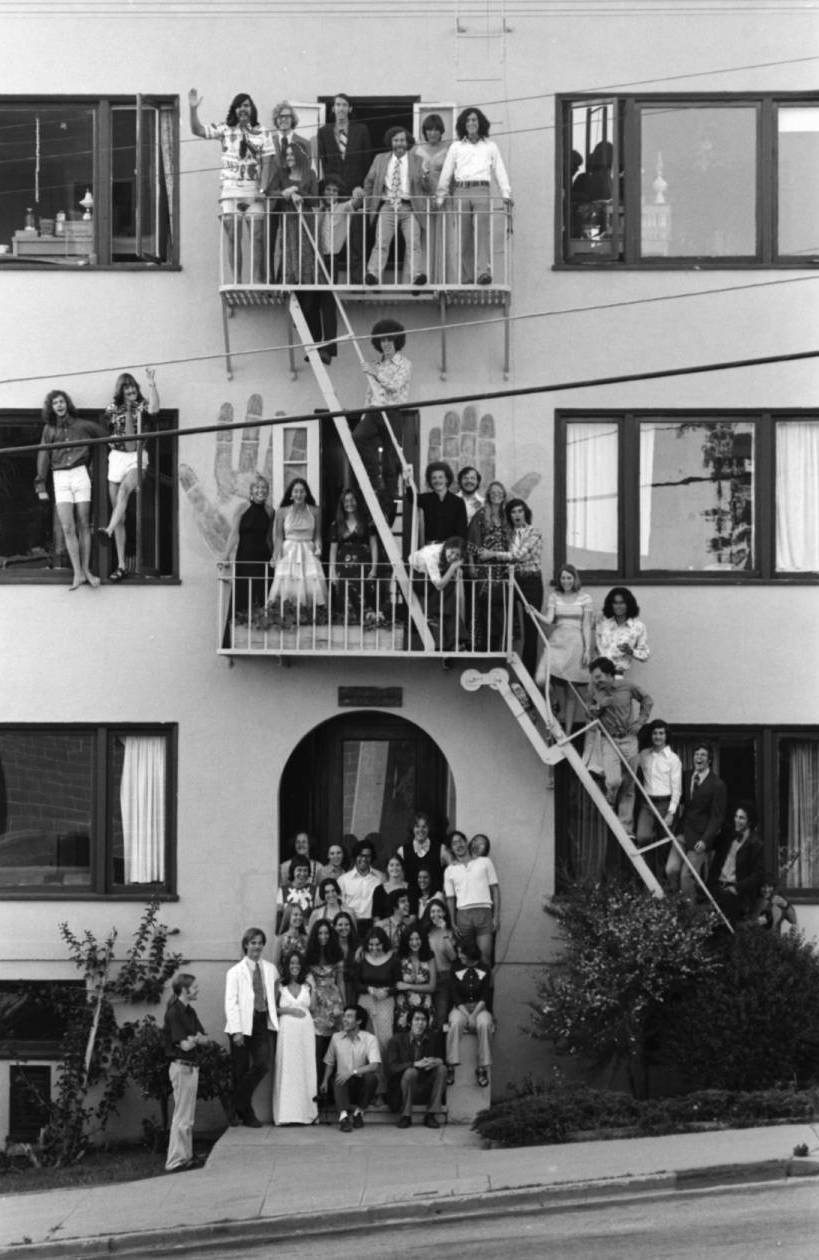
1975

Originally built to be a hotel, the building consists of three floors and a basement. On the basement level is the kitchen, dining room, laundry room, TV room, free pile, and maintenance area. By the entrance on the first floor are the lizard lounge (a small recreational area created by combining two adjacent rooms), the study room, and the Mystery Room.

On the first through third floors are the individual rooms. All of these floors are L-shaped, with a long South wing and a shorter North wing. There is one staircase near the front of the South wing and one at the back of it. The east half of the South wing of the building houses most of the single rooms, which have eastward facing windows. There is also one single on each floor on the east side of the North wing, near the back stairs. These rooms have northward facing windows.

The remaining rooms in the west half of the South wing, the corner of the South wing, and in the North wing are doubles. Usually every two doubles share a private bathroom, and there are also two restrooms in the hall (one with a shower) on each floor. These are used mostly by guests and residents living in single rooms. Some of the rooms have hardwood floors, while others are carpeted. All of the hallways and staircases are carpeted.

== Notable residents ==
- Beverly Cleary (1938), author of the Ramona series of children's books. Cleary stayed in Room 228 during her two years at Berkeley.
- Marion Nestle, author of Food Politics.

== Events ==
Like in other co-op houses, there are several events that occur every fall and spring semester. One such event is Special Dinner and another is the Room-to-Room, where residents decorate their rooms and serve refreshments. Stebbins is also known for its '80s parties.
