= Rochdale (disambiguation) =

Rochdale is a large town in Greater Manchester, England.

Rochdale may also refer to:

== Places ==
=== Geography ===
- Metropolitan Borough of Rochdale, a metropolitan borough of Greater Manchester in North West England which includes Rochdale, as well as other settlements
- Rochdale (ancient parish), an ancient parish centred on the town of Rochdale
- Rochdale (UK Parliament constituency), a parliamentary constituency represented in the House of Commons of the Parliament of the United Kingdom
- Rochdale Village, a housing cooperative and neighborhood in the southeastern corner of the New York City borough of Queens.
- Rochdale Village (Berkeley, California), US
- Rochdale (Osasco), a neighborhood of Osasco, São Paulo, Brazil.

=== Housing developments and higher education institutions ===
- Rochdale College, a centre of the 1960s-70s youth counter culture in Toronto, Canada
- Rochdale Sixth Form College, Rochdale, England, UK
- Rochdale Village, UCB, Berkeley, California, USA

== Sports ==
- Rochdale A.F.C., a football club
- Rochdale Hornets, an English rugby league club

== Transport ==
- Rochdale (car), a make of car. The firm took its name from the town and produced kit cars
- Rochdale One, a former cruise ship used as housing for students in Amsterdam between 2004 and 2013
- Rochdale, a troop ship, one of the two in the Sinking of the Rochdale and the Prince of Wales in 1807

== Other uses ==
- The Rochdale Principles, provide the basis for the principles of cooperation in use by cooperatives around the world
- The Rochdale Society of Equitable Pioneers, a group of weavers who designed the Rochdale Principles
- Rochdale child sex abuse ring, an ongoing scandal involving many underage young women and girls abused and exploited
