= CZ =

CZ, C-Z, C/Z, or Cz may refer to:

== Places ==
- Czech Republic (ISO 3166 country code CZ)
  - .cz, internet country code top-level domain for the Czech Republic
- Casa Zimbabwe, a student housing unit in Berkeley, California, U.S.
- Canal Zone

== People and characters ==
- Changpeng Zhao, co-founder and former CEO of cryptocurrency exchange Binance
- Cz, a character from Scrapped Princess

== Businesses, groups, organisations ==
- C/Z Records, an American record label
- Česká zbrojovka Uherský Brod, a Czech firearms manufacturer
  - Česká zbrojovka Strakonice (ČZ a.s.), a Czech manufacturer of forklifts and formerly motorcycles and firearms
- Crvena Zvezda, a Serbian football club
- Cizeta, an Italian car manufacturer named for its founder, Claudio Zampolli (C.Z.)
- China Southern Airlines (IATA airline code CZ)

== Science, engineering, technology ==
- Cubic zirconia, a synthetic gemstone
- Haplogroup CZ (mtDNA), in human mitochondrial genetics
- Controlled Z gate, a type of Quantum logic gate
- Cz, an EEG electrode site according to the 10-20 system

== Brands, products ==
- Long March (rocket family), or Chang Zheng
- Citizendium, an online encyclopedia project

== Other uses ==
- Cz (digraph), in the Polish language
- CZ, vehicle registration prefix of Province of Catanzaro, Italy
