= Oscar Maurer =

American Pictorialist photographer

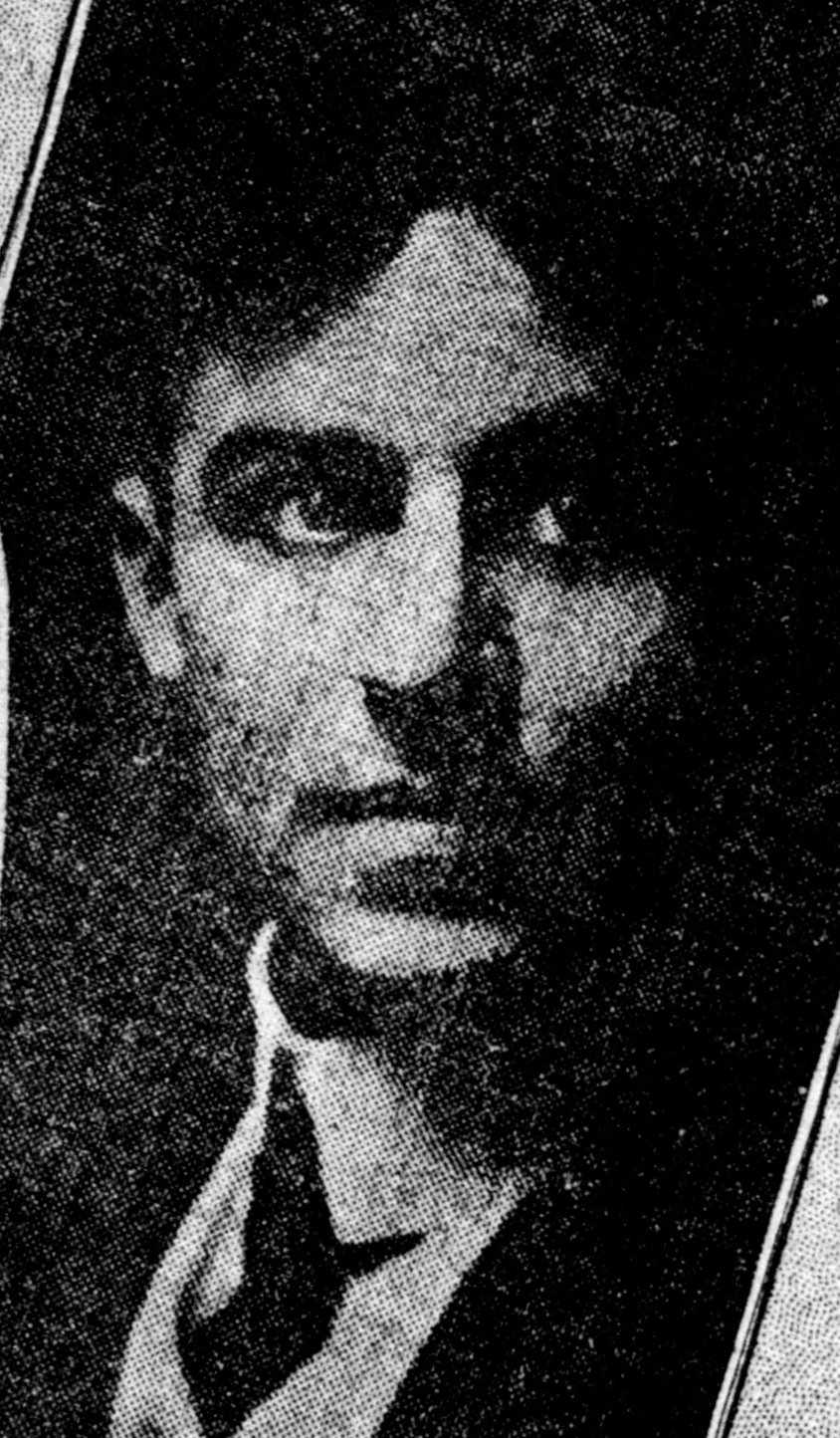
Oscar Maurer

Oscar Maurer (17 July 1870–9 June 1965) was a nationally recognized Pictorialist photographer based in California. His photographs appeared in Camera Work, Camera Craft, The Camera, and other photography journals. His studio in Berkeley, designed by Bernard Maybeck and built in 1907, is an architectural landmark.

== Early life ==
Oscar Maurer was born in New York City and moved with his family to San Francisco in 1886. His uncle, the lithographer Louis Maurer, encouraged him to take up photography as an important new artistic medium. The teenaged Oscar got a box camera, set up a darkroom in the basement, and was soon selling a line of San Francisco scenes to local art stores. He studied chemistry and physics at the University of California but didn’t pursue a scientific career. Between 1891 and 1898, he worked as a salesman for Bass-Hueter Paint Company. By 1897 he had become a member of the California Camera Club.

== Career ==
In 1898 Maurer traveled to Mexico, where he made his photograph “The Storm,” exhibited at the Chicago Salon of 1900. In 1899 he exhibited a selection of his photographs at the California State Fair in Sacramento. He had an article on photography as art, "A Plea for Recognition," published in the new Camera Craft in 1900. That year he was elected to the board of directors of the California Camera Club, and he and William E. Dassonville opened a portrait studio in San Francisco. In early 1901 Maurer entered ten prints in the First San Francisco Photographic Salon, then traveled in Europe with Dassonville. Having returned in time for the Second Photographic Salon in 1902, Maurer entered “about twenty studies,” which the San Francisco Call reviewer considered “the best individual collection of photographs.” Also in 1902, Maurer’s work was presented in Charles H. Caffin’s article “The New Photography” in Munsey’s Magazine. He became a regular contributor to Sunset magazine. In 1903-04 he and Anne Brigman were the only California photographers listed as "Associates" of the prestigious Photo-Secession in New York.

== Marriage ==
In 1903, Maurer married Margaret Robinson, one of the founders of the Hillside Club. Beginning in 1905 they lived at Weltevreden, the showcase Berkeley home of Margaret's mother, Mary Moody. Between 1906 and 1911 Maurer was an avid supporter of the Berkeley art colony and contributed to exhibitions at the Studio Building, Art Association and Hillside Club. He helped organize the Berkeley Arts and Crafts Society "Art salons" in his home and those hosted by his concert pianist brother, Frederick, that were widely reported in the press. Maurer twice contributed to the Alameda County Exposition where in 1908 Brigman referred to his study of a Mexican Doorway as "majestic." Around 1914, Oscar and his wife left Berkeley for Del Mar, California and in 1916 they moved to Los Angeles.

== Destruction and exhibition of work ==
Maurer had a studio in the California Academy of Sciences building (819 Market Street, San Francisco) at the time of the 1906 San Francisco earthquake and fire. The building and his entire body of work were destroyed in the fire. He made a series of photographs of the devastation, using a No. 1 Folding Kodak camera. The use of concrete in building his Berkeley studio the following year reflected his desire not to repeat the experience.

After 1906, Maurer continued to exhibit his photographs in prestigious venues such as Alfred Stieglitz's Photo-Secession Gallery at 291 Fifth Avenue, New York. Many of his images were published in the American Journal of Photography over the next two decades. He also wrote technical articles and essays on his photographic excursions, sometimes publishing in Sunset magazine.

While his exhibition and published photographs often depicted nature and street scenes, Maurer derived his income mostly from portrait photography.

== Divorce and second marriage ==
Oscar and Margaret divorced in the early 1920s and he married Elizabeth Baker Robinson, a performance artist. They lived in Berkeley from the late 1920s on except for some time in Santa Monica in the 1940s. She died in 1957.

== Legacy ==
In 1965, curator Therese Heyman acquired for the Oakland Art Museum (predecessor of the Oakland Museum of California) many of Maurer's works and papers. The museum presented an exhibition of his 1906 post-earthquake photographs in February 1965. He died later the same year, aged 94.
