= Berkeley Student Cooperative =

Student housing cooperative in Berkeley, California

- Abbreviation: BSC
- Nickname: The Co-ops
- Founded: 1933
- Type: Corporation
- Legal status: 501(c)(3)
- Purpose: Student housing cooperative
- Headquarters: 2424 Ridge Road, Berkeley, California 94709
- Location: Berkeley, CA, United States
- Coordinates: 37.875641°N 122.260956°W
- Services: Affordable housing; Meal plans
- Members: Approximately 1250
- President: Gyn Gomez (2024–2025)
- Executive Director: Joshua Fenton
- Website: bsc.coop
- Formerly called: University of California Student's Co-operative Association (UCSCA); University Student's Cooperative Association (USCA)

The Berkeley Student Cooperative (BSC) (formerly known as University Students' Cooperative Association or the USCA) is a student housing cooperative serving primarily UC Berkeley students, but open to any full-time post-secondary student. The BSC houses and/or feeds over 1,300 students in 17 houses and three apartment buildings. Food is provided to residents of the 17 houses, which also offer boarding meal plans to non-residents. As part of their rental agreement, residents of the houses are required to perform workshifts, typically five hours per week. The BSC is led by a board of directors which is primarily composed of and elected by student members.

== History ==
In the beginning of 1933, to meet the need for affordable student housing during the Great Depression, Berkeley YMCA director Harry Lees Kingman inspired a group of students to start the first cooperative house in Berkeley, where student would do work-shifts in exchange for common food and lower rent. The house would be based on Rochdale Principles, which include: democratic control, common purchase of the cheapest available produce, open membership, market prices charged, political neutrality, limited interest on any invested capital, and return of savings to members in return for their investment. A rooming house became the first unit, with ten students becoming the first members and twelve more joining before the end of the semester.

In the fall of 1933, the students leased from Sigma Nu a Northside fraternity house, it became the original Barrington Hall housing 48 students. The following year, another fraternity house was leased, this time on Southside, it became Sheridan Hall housing 100 students. The two joined to form the University of California Students' Cooperative Association (UCSCA). In 1935, the Sigma Nu lease was allowed to expire and instead UCSCA leased Berkeley's largest apartment building located at 2315 Dwight Way, housing 200 members and took on the name Barrington Hall. USCA's third house opened the following year, a former inn on Northside Ridge street became Stebbins Hall, the first female unit housing 82 members. Next, Sherman Hall originally a sorority, Oxford a large apartment building and Atherton a smaller house next to Barington, were opened. Oxford would house 112 members and also became a central-kitchen, supplying daily meals to almost all of the houses.

As the US entered World War II the number of male students dropped significantly and Sherman and Atherton stopped operating. As California began forcefully relocating Japanese Americans from their homes, USCA agreed to assist and take over the lease on the Japanese Student Club's building. It became Lexington Hall, housing around 30 women prior to its return in 1948. On the other hand, Barrington Hall was temporarily rented to the Navy resulting in Oxford becoming the sole male residence. While previously deteriorating, under Navy's control Barrington underwent complete physical renovation.

Right after World War II, the UCSCA purchased Ridge House, formerly a mansion, and the year after that – Cloyne Court Hotel. Both properties were bought to house men as there was a sharp increase in the student population caused by the GI Bill. There would be 51 students at Ridge House and 150 at Cloyne Court Hotel. Several years later a former Inn was purchased, similar in structure and size, like Stebbins it was converted to an all female house. Several years later, due to changes in state law, the association could no longer have University of California in its name, and changed its name to the University Students' Cooperative Association (USCA). A smaller house – Kidd hall was purchased in 1960, and in 1966, USCA opened one of the first co-ed student housing projects in the nation – the Ridge Project.

In the 1960s and 1970s, Berkeley saw a decline in the popularity of the Greek System, which allowed the USCA to purchase defunct sororities which became Davis House, Andres Castro Arms, and Wolf House. The 1970s saw the opening of Lothlorien Hall, a vegetarian theme house, and Kingman Hall, both of which formerly housed New Age communities. Lothlorien was previously leased to the One World Family Commune and Kingman Hall was owned by the Berkeley Living Love Center. (Note: One World Family ran a vegetarian restaurant, bakery, pizzeria, clothing store and a night club in the building that now houses Berkeley's Amoeba Records. All of its members money and resources were held in common and all decisions made through consensus.) This decade also saw the construction and opening of the Rochdale Village Apartments, one of BSC's three apartment facilities. The others are Fenwick Weaver's Village and the Northside Apartments. BSC also owns two graduate and re-entry student houses, the Convent and Hillegass/Parker House, formerly Le Chateau. In 1987, due to its confusion with the Ridge House and the negative connotation of the word "project", the Ridge Project's name was changed to Casa Zimbabwe. In 1989, the members of the USCA voted to close Barrington Hall, its largest co-op, in reaction to complaints from neighbors and problems with the city. The following decade also saw the opening of two new theme houses: the African American Theme House, opened in response to the university's closing of all of its theme houses; and, in 1999, Oscar Wilde House. Oscar Wilde House is a former fraternity house, which the USCA was able to buy due to the continuing decline in the popularity of the Greek system in Berkeley.

In 2007, to make itself easier to find online, and to reflect a membership that also includes community college students, the organization changed its name to the Berkeley Student Cooperative (BSC).

=== Governance ===
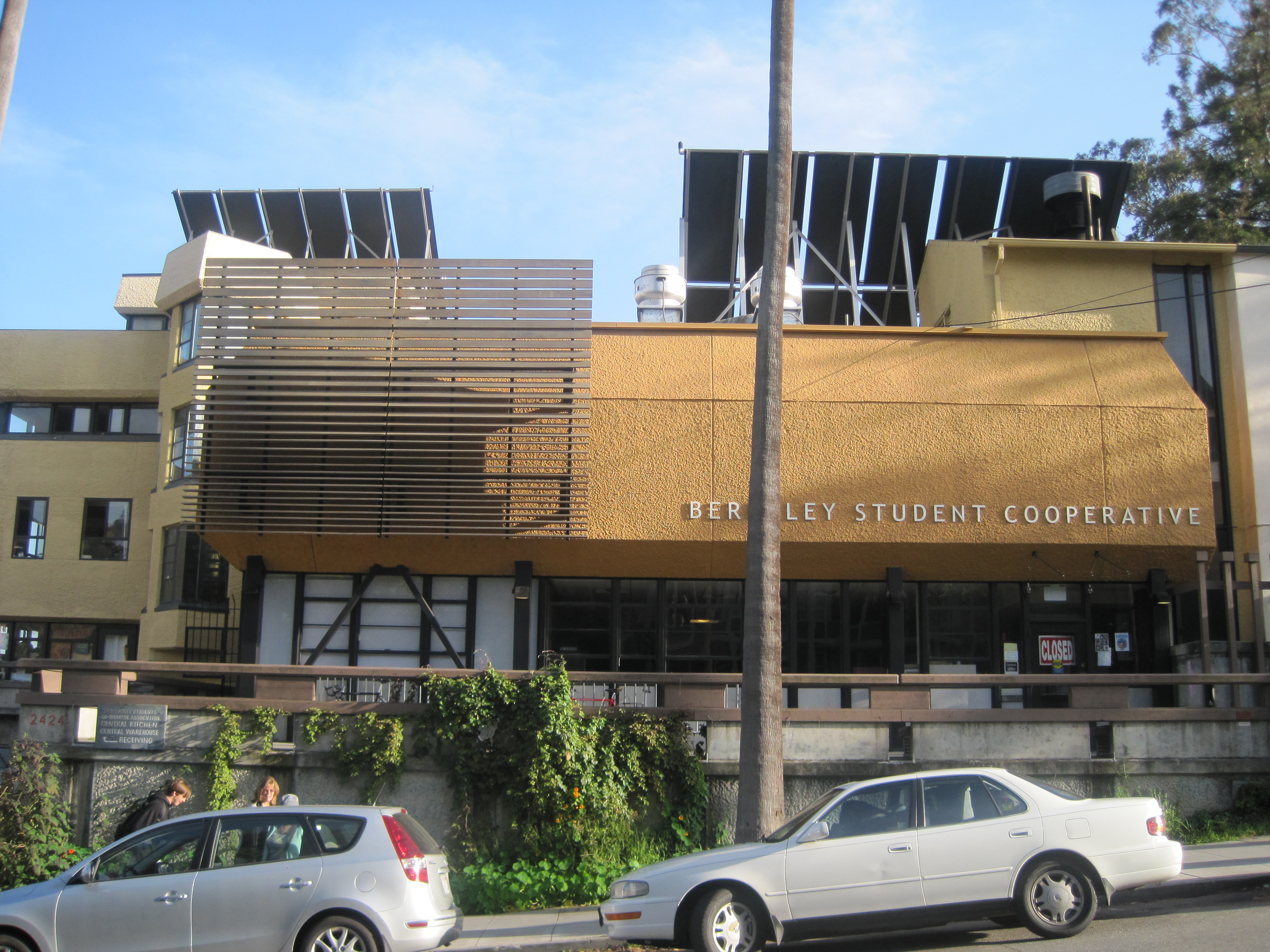
Central Office

The BSC is governed by a board of directors with 28 voting members. Each of the 17 houses and 3 apartment complexes elects a representative to a 12-month term approximately corresponding the UC Berkeley academic year. Larger houses may have up to 4 representatives. The BSC Alumni Association and Employees Association also each have one representative. At the recommendation of the president, the board may also seat 1–2 members of the BSC Alumni Association and/or the UC Berkeley faculty as additional board members. Most decisions are made by majority vote.

The President and Vice presidents, who run committees that screen proposals for the board, are student members elected by the board to 1-year terms. The BSC also has a permanent staff of approximately 20, including maintenance, office, and food warehouse employees. Staff supervises student managers who handle day-to-day management at the houses and apartment complexes. These managers are elected by their individual houses. Each house also holds councils every week or every other week to set house level policies and allocate house level budgets.

== Central co-op services ==
In front of the Casa Zimbabwe building are the BSC's Central Office and the Central Kitchen and Central Maintenance facilities. Central Office handles all of the applications to BSC and determines where members will be placed. Placement is based on applicants eligibility, how long they have been a member of BSC, the member's preferences, and the number of vacancies in their preferred house(s). Central Kitchen handles and delivers the food orders for all of the houses but not the apartments. Food orders are handled on the house level by the Food or Kitchen Managers. Central Kitchen also handles the supply orders for all of the houses, such as toilet paper and cleaning supplies, as well as the furniture orders for both the houses and the apartments. Central Maintenance is responsible for major work on the houses, including major projects or renovations. Most minor work is handled by house Maintenance Managers. Permanent staff of the BSC is organized into a collective bargaining unit known as the Employee Association.

== Priority for disadvantaged students ==
The BSC offers priority to students in the UC Berkeley Educational Opportunity Program (EOP) (or equivalent at their respective college or university), students with disabilities, transfer students, undocumented students, and international students studying abroad at a University of California campus.

== Sustainability ==
At the house or apartment complex level, residents have the option of electing a "WRM" Waste-reduction Manager. These managers are responsible for recycling plastics, glass, paper, cardboard as well as composting. Waster-reduction Managers usually maintain color-coded bins, post information sheets and hold workshops/seminars to help residents make sustainable choices. WRMs can fine residents who do not follow house/apartment sustainability policies. The BSC also incorporates food waste reduction strategies into its food management system, by coordinating collections of compost. Cooperative living is sustainable in the sense that group living involves shared meals and facilities that can contribute to less waste, reduction in resource use, and collaboration in sustainable efforts.

== Properties ==
The BSC currently operates 20 houses and apartments (of which it owns 16), housing and/or feeding over 1300 students and ranging from small houses of 17 residents to large houses of over 100 residents. The BSC also owns the former site of Barrington Hall, which it leases to a for-profit landlord.

=== Historical buildings ===
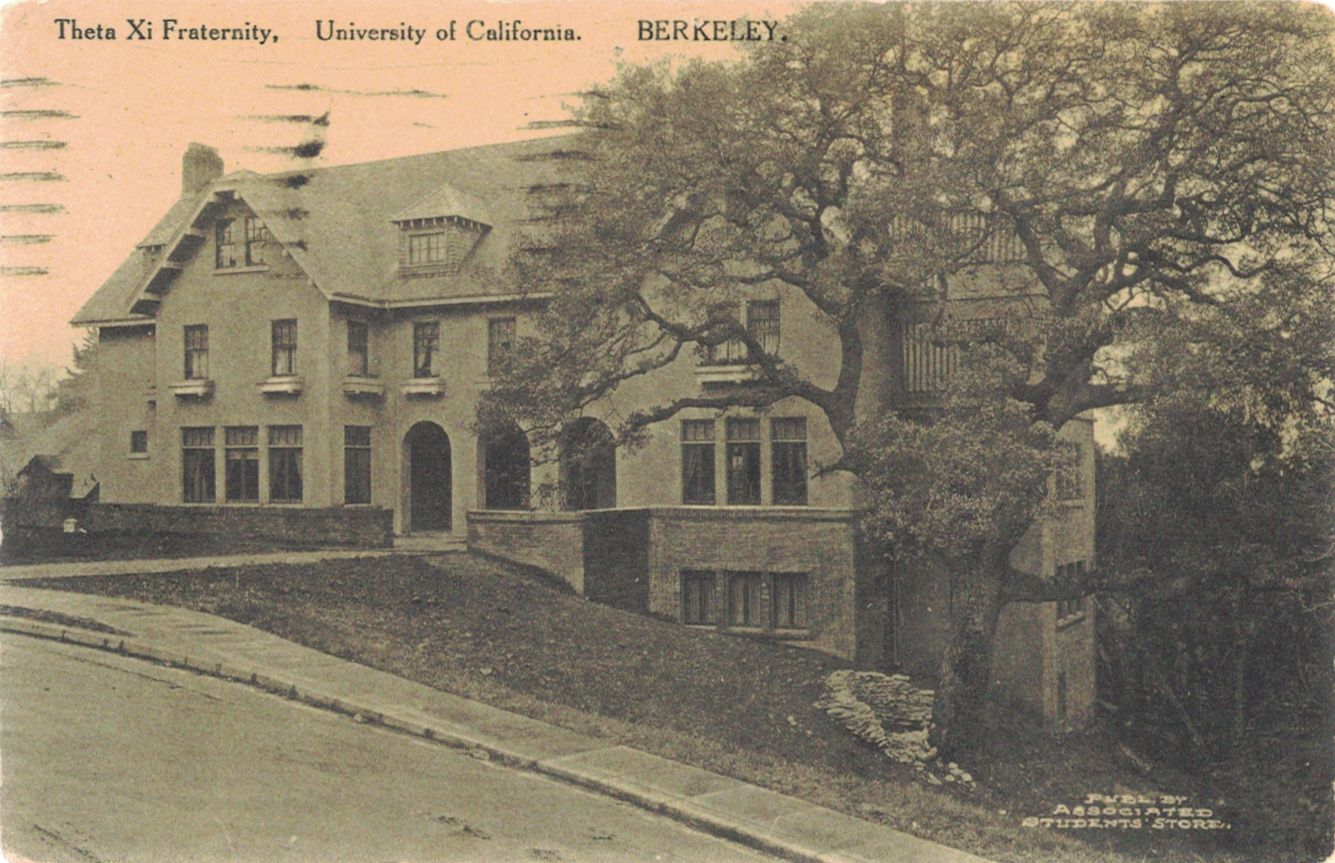
Kingman Hall 1914

BSC properties date back as far as 1904 with several of the buildings are considered to be architectural highlights of the city. Two of them are now considered as architectural landmarks: Cloyne Court built in 1904 and designated by National Register of Historic Places in 1992, and Kingman Hall built in 1914 and designated by Berkeley Landmark Preservation in 1999. BSC's other notable buildings include Ridge House designed by John Galen Howard, and three buildings designed by architect Julia Morgan – Davis Hall, Wolf House and Person of Color Theme House (Castro).

==== Ridge House ====
The Ridge House is a faux Tudor mansion built in 1906 during the Beaux-Arts architecture movement by John Galen Howard. Who was supervising architect of the Master Plan for the University of California, Berkeley campus, and founding the University of California's architecture program. Among his buildings are the Campanile, California Memorial Stadium, Sather Gate, and the Hearst Greek Theatre. He was also the architect of another BSC house – Cloyne Court Hotel. The Ridge House is located in Northside, one block North of the university. It sits atop Holy Hill, the area in the vicinity of a five-way intersection surrounded on all sides by churches and seminaries, such as Graduate Theological Union. It was built for University's economics and political science professor Adolf Miller and changed hands several times before being bought by the BSC in 1945; where it now houses 38 students. Although retrofitted for the student housing, there are still working fireplaces, exposed, half-timber redwood beams, along with a secret stairway.

==== Davis House, Wolf House and Person of Color Theme House ====
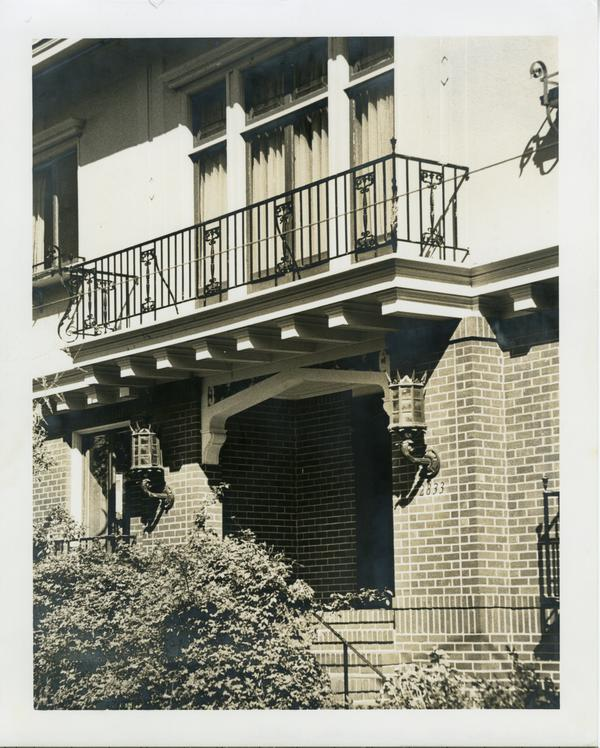
Davis House 1913

Julia Morgan was the first woman architect licensed in California, and her first employment was with Howard assisting him with the University of California Master Plan; she was the primary designer for the Hearst Greek Theatre. During this time she was also the architect of three building owned by the BSC – Davis House, Wolf House and Person of Color Theme House (formerly known as Andres Castro Arms).

Davis House is located at 2833 Bancroft Steps, Southside of campus, on a pedestrian pathway between it and the Alpha Phi sorority, also being close to International House and California Memorial Stadium. It holds 36 residents and is considered to be the finest residence at BCS. Referred to as "the retirement home, " as it is occupied by co-opers who have been part of the BSC system for the longest time. The building was originally built in 1913 as the Richard Clark house, a single-family mansion, built for the family of Richard Clark an associate of William Randolph Hearst. The beautiful interiors are described by Sara Holmes Boutelle in her book Julia Morgan: Architect: "Morgan gave free play to her love of complexity in the wood-paneled living room, dining room, and library, all of which have fireplaces with elaborate mantels. The living-room mantel is carved of oak, showing acorns, leaves, birds, and squirrels; another has classical details; brackets in the hall and on yet another fireplace, in the library, repeat the Tudor rose." With the completion of Memorial Stadium in 1923 and the International House in 1929, the neighborhood transferred from one of quiet, expensive mansions into a student-oriented neighborhood dominated by sorority and fraternity houses. At some point the house became a sorority Alpha Xi Delta and several additions were made to the building, including a sleeping porch with a deck above that features an expansive view of San Francisco Bay and the Golden Gate Bridge. In the 1960s, the popularity of the Greek system in Berkeley saw a steady decline. Many sorority and fraternity houses were forced to close for want of members, including Davis. In 1969, BSC purchased the building, one of several former Greek houses it acquired during this era. Davis Hall opened to residents in January 1970. Like all co-ops, each member had a five-hour work shift every week, and for seven of the members, cooking dinner was the shift, at the time this stood out from the other houses whose food was delivered from the central kitchen.

Wolf House houses 29 residents, located one house down from Piedmont Avenue, between the Wright Institute and Kappa Kappa Gamma, and two blocks from the University of California. It can be considered as part of the 'frat row' on the Southside area of Berkeley, area dominated by sororities and fraternities. Built for the Rector of St. Mark's Church, the Rev. Edward L. Parsons, in 1905 and originally situated just east of Telegraph Avenue on Durant at 2532. In 1915, with the commercialization of Telegraph, the family of Rev. Parsons decided to have the house moved up Durant Avenue to 2732. The front porch became enclosed and under Morgan's supervision the location of the front door changed to fit the lot. In 1924, when Rev. Parsons became the Episcopal Bishop of California, the family moved to San Francisco, (Note: Parsons went on to serve as the chairman of ACLU from 1941 to 1958.) the house was first rented and later sold. It was the location of a sorority before being bought by BSC in 1974. In 2002, to make the building accessible to disabled residents, BSC added a ramp that ran the length of the house along Durant to the front door, bisecting the front stairs.

Person of Color Theme House (Castro) houses 56 residents and is located at 2310 Prospect Street close to Davis house, on the other side of Alpha Phi. Its most distinguishing external feature is the three-story red brick staircase leading up to the Warring Street entrance. Built in 1911, it was designed in the Mediterranean style for metallurgist Charles Washington Merrill, with the view of the bay being the centerpiece of its design. It originally featured an S-shaped driveway running up the steep hill to the house and the interior was elaborately decorated with redwood, pine and oak paneling, similar to the interior of Davis. This changed in the 1930s, when the house was bought by the Zeta Tau Alpha sorority, which stripped the interiors of the woodwork and enclosed the front porch in glass. In the 1950s, it added a northwest wing. Eventually, like other Greek houses in ZTA was unable to attract enough members to remain open. BSC purchased the building in 1971, and decided to name the house in honor of long-time central kitchen cook Andres Castro, who was seriously ill at the time, but later recovered. It became Person of Color Theme House (Castro) in 2016.

=== Houses ===
Name	Photograph	Rooms and Residents	Address	Notes
African American Theme House		21 Residents 3 Singles – 6 Doubles – 2 Triples	2347 Prospect Street Berkeley, CA 94704	Located close to the Memorial Stadium, the house was formally a UC Berkeley Slavic House. It was bought by BSC, becoming a co-op 1997, two years after California's ban on affirmative action which resulted in African American student population at the university decreasing from 6.5% to less than 3%. The residence is open to students of all backgrounds. House members promote their theme by doing community service and hosting student events. Members affectionately call each other "Afros" and the house "Afro House".
Casa Zimbabwe		124 residents 31 Singles – 30 Doubles – 11 Triples	2422 Ridge Rd, CA 93021	Main article: Casa Zimbabwe Opened in 1966, Casa Zimbabwe, commonly referred to as CZ, is located in Northside a block from the North Gate of the university. It sits on what is referred to as the "Holy Hill", the area surrounding a five-way intersection surrounded on all sides by churches and seminaries, such as the Graduate Theological Union. While at the time every other BSC house was a preexisting structure eventually converted into a co-op, CZ was built with the specific intent of being used as a cooperative living space. It was one of the first co-ed student housing in the nation.
Cloyne Court		140 Residents 38 Singles – 39 Doubles – 8 Triples	2600 Ridge Road Berkeley, CA 94709	Main article: Cloyne Court Hotel The Cloyne Court Hotel, often referred to as Cloyne and like a lot of other BCS houses, is close to the north side of the university. Cloyne was built in 1904, as a high-class hotel, and became a BSC co-op in 1946. In the past, the house was known for its party and rules-free culture and played a notable role in the Bay Area music scene. In 2014, the house became substance-free and academically themed.
Davis House		36 residents 8 Singles – 11 Doubles – 2 triples	2833 Bancroft Steps Berkeley, CA 94704	Designed by Julia Morgan and built next to the Memorial Stadium in 1913, it became part of BSC in 1969. It is considered to be the finest residence at BCS, and is referred to as "the retirement home", as it is home to co-opers who have lived in the coops the longest. It is named in honor of Bill Davis who was a member of the first Berkeley co-op (1933) and went on to become one of the key figures in BSC history. Members of the house refer to themselves as Davisaurs.
Euclid Hall		24 Residents 14 Singles – 5 Doubles	1777 Euclid Ave Berkeley, CA 94709	The residents of Euclid Hall are affectionately referred to as Euclidians. Euclid Hall was originally the University of California Japanese Students' Club (JSC). During World War II, when Japanese Americans were forcibly removed from the west coast. Through a previous connection between the two organizations, the building was leased to BSC, being returned in 1948. In 1967, faced with declining occupancy JSC sold the building to BSC. Being on the Northside, it close to other co-ops.
Hillegass Parker House		57 Residents 57 Singles	2545 Hillegass Avenue Berkeley, CA 94704	From the 1970s until 2005, Hillegass Parker House (aka HiP House) was the site of Le Chateau, a large co-op for 85 residents, composed of three building and an outdoor pool. After closure of Barrington Hall, Le Chateau took its role to become the "black sheep of the system, Cal's communal-living version of Animal House". After ongoing complaints and numerous court cases filed by its neighbors, an agreement was reached, with BSC converting the house to graduate, or re-entry 25 and older co-op. Opened in 2005, the number of residents was shrunk and the house was refurbished, with a "European Inn, in the Orient", bamboo furniture included, with the outdoor pool being filled in with cement. Residents became known as the "Hippos".
Hoyt Hall		60 Residents 31 Singles – 13 Doubles – 1 Triple	2519 Ridge Road Berkeley, CA 94709	Hoyt Hall is located on Northside and was purchased by BSC in 1953. An all women cooperative it was only one building away from another all women hall – Stebbins. The two houses had a close relationship, both rivalry and comradery wise. It was named after Aice G. Hoyt for her significant aid to the cooperative. With Stebbins becoming coed, Hoyt and Sherman Hall are the remaining women-only co-ops; both are coed during the summer.
Kidd Hall		17 Residents 3 singles – 7 Doubles	2562 Le Conte Avenue Berkeley, CA 94709	The smallest house in BSC, it was named after Alexander Morrison Hall, a criminal law professor at Boalt Hall who was on the BSC faculty board in the 1940s. Located in a wooded neighborhood two blocks north of the UC Berkeley campus, Kidd Hall features a backyard redwood forest-niche intersected by Strawberry Creek.
Kingman Hall		50 Residents 11 Singles – 18 Doubles – 1 Triple	1730 La Loma Ave Berkeley, CA 94709	Main article: Kingman Hall The hall was originally designed as a fraternity in 1914, Berkeley Living Love Center in 1973 and joined the BSC as Kingman Hall in 1977. It is named after Harry L. Kingman, director of the local University YMCA who encouraged BSC founders to start the cooperative in 1933. The hall is considered to be a Berkeley Landmark.
Lothlorien		58 residents 14 Singles – 15 Doubles – 2 Triples – 2 Quads	2415 Prospect Street Berkeley, CA 94704	Main article: Lothlorien (co-op) Commonly known as Loth, this is a vegetarian themed house. Many residents are vegetarians and vegans, but diet is not a condition of residence. Lothlorien retains a unique communal culture with fusion of art and progressive activism being a mainstay of the house.
Person of Color Theme House (Castro)		56 Residents 7 Singles – 20 Doubles – 2 Triples – 1 Quad	2310 Prospect Street Berkeley, CA 94704	Like other BSC historical buildings, Person of Color Theme House (Castro) was an early 20th century, expansive family home, which became a sorority before it was bought by BSC in 1971. It was named Andres Castro Arms after a long time chef of the BSC central kitchen. It became Person of Color Theme house in 2016 to accommodate minority and low income students, majority of whom were living in BSC apartments rather than co-op houses, with some feeling apart from other house-communities.
Ridge House		38 Residents 11 Singles – 6 Doubles – 5 Triples	2420 Ridge Road Berkeley, CA 94709	Formally a mansion, Ridge House is an architecturally unique building that sits a top of the "Holy Hill" just north of the Berkeley campus. Turned into a co-op it still retains its intricate architecture, combining it with an expansive view of San Francisco and Golden Gate. It is connected Casa Zimbabwe and its BSC central office through what has been dubbed as "the air-lock".
Sherman Hall		40 Residents 8 Singles – 13 Doubles – 2 Triples	2250 Prospect Street Berkeley, CA 94704	Sherman Hall is an all female house, co-ed in the summer, with its residents referring to themselves as Sherminites. It is one of the two women-only houses in BSC. Sherman is located on the South Side of Berkeley near the California Memorial Stadium and IHouse and next door to Davis Hall. Opened in 1942, Sherman was originally a sorority house.
Stebbins		64 Residents 18 Singles – 23 Doubles	2527 Ridge Road Berkeley, CA 94709	Main article: Stebbins Hall Stebbins Hall is located on the north side of the University of California, Berkeley campus. The University Student Cooperative Association purchased a hotel in 1936 as a site for the first all-women cooperative house, and it remained this way until 1971 when Stebbins became co-ed. It was named after Lucy Ward Stebbins, former Dean of Women at University of California, Berkeley. The green hands on the front of the building were painted by residents of Cloyne as a prank, when Cloyne was all men and Stebbins was all women. Residents refer to themselves as "Stebbinites" and claim the lizard as their mascot.
The Convent		25 Residents 25 Singles	1601 Allston Way Berkeley, CA 94703	The Convent a former convent, bought by is located at about a mile from the UC Berkeley campus. Because it is located on university property, all residents are required to be students of the university, which is also true of Cloyne Court. Like Hillegass/Parker House, the Convent is BSC coop housing only graduate and re-entry age 25 and over students. It is the only co-op in which all residents have single rooms. With an older resident population and a more isolated location, it has a reputation for being quieter and cleaner than other coops. Its rec room is a converted chapel.
Oscar Wilde House		38 Residents 8 Singles – 15 Doubles	2410 Warring Street Berkeley, CA 94704	Located in 'frat row' on the Southside of Berkeley, among Berkeley's fraternities and sororities, the house was bought from a fraternity and opened as a co-op in 1999. It was the first gay-themed student co-operative housing in the country. The house was named in honor of Oscar Wilde, brilliant Irish author and social critic.
Wolf House		29 Residents 9 Singles – 7 Doubles – 2 Triples	2732 Durant Avenue Berkeley, CA 94704	Wolf House ("Wolfhause") is located two blocks from the university; residents refer to themselves as "wolves". Located two blocks away from the university in the Southside area of Berkeley, next to Piedmont avenue in the area of fraternities and sororities known as 'frat row'. The house was the location of a sorority before being bought by BSC in 1974. For further detail see Historical buildings.

=== Apartments ===
All BSC apartment units are wheelchair accessible.

Name	Photograph	Apartments and Residents	Address	Notes
Fenwick Weavers' Village		102 Residents 36 Apartments of 1 to 4 bedroom	2415 Dwight Way Berkeley, CA 94704	Fenwick Weavers' Village was named in honor of Fenwick Weavers' Society a professional association created in the village of Fenwick, East Ayrshire, Scotland in 1761 and is considered by some to be the first co-operative. This village opened in 1980 and is located next to Rochdale. Like in Rochdale, only UC Berkeley students can reside during Fall and Spring semesters. Fenwich property includes Davis Park, along with a basketball court and a garden.
Northside Apartments		26 Residents 13 One Bedroom Apartments – 3 Studio Apartments	2526 - 2540 Le Conte Ave. Berkeley, CA 94709	Northside Apartments is located near Kidd, Euclid, Stebbins, and Hoyt co-ops, in the Northside neighborhood of Berkeley. It opened in 1960, the co-op is composed of two adjacent small apartment buildings. The feel of the residence is different from the communal atmosphere of the houses as majority of the co-opers are busy working on post graduate degrees; the members of the co-op do get together every month.
Rochdale Village		259 residents 96 apartments 1 to 4 bedrooms	2424 Haste St. Berkeley, CA 94704	Main article: Rochdale Village (Berkeley, California) Rochdale Village was named after the English town of Rochdale, Greater Manchester, where the Rochdale Pioneers developed the Rochdale Principles of cooperation. In 1970, the City of Berkeley, the University of California, and the BSC collaborative to expand the supply of low-cost housing for University students. The result was the financing and construction of Rochdale Village, one of the first student housing projects in the nation to receive United States Department of Housing and Urban Development (HUD) financing. More than 80% of the 259 current residents of Rochdale Village are part of the university's Educational Opportunity Program, reserved for students of a low-income or educationally disadvantaged background. Because the land on which Rochdale is located is leased from the university, only UC Berkeley students are eligible to reside during Fall and Spring semesters. There are units that are wheelchair accessible.

=== Defunct co-ops ===
The following facilities were once owned and/or operated by the BSC, but are now closed or otherwise defunct.

- Rooming house on the Southside (Spring 1933)
- The first Barrington Hall (1933–1935)
- Second Barrington Hall (1935–1943; 1950–1989)
- Sheridan Hall (1934–1943)
- Atherton (1937–~1942)
- Oxford Hall (1938–1977), original location of Central Kitchen (CK), leased until purchase in 1963
- The first Kingman Hall (Likely the late 1930s–1946) (same location as the first Barrington Hall)
- Lexington Hall (1942–1948), leased from the Japanese Students Club in response to the internment of Japanese-Americans during World War II; building later purchased and became Euclid Hall
- The first Rochdale (1943–1945), a 16-woman leasehold house
- House in San Francisco's Buena Vista neighborhood (1944–1957)
- Eisenfitz, Clod-haven, and Ridge Annex (1959–1960)
- Le Chateau (1977–2005), converted to Hillegass-Parker House in response to lawsuit

== Famous BSC alumni ==
- Beverly Cleary (1936–1938, Stebbins Hall), author of children's books, most notably the Ramona series
- Narsai David (1953–1955, Cloyne Court), chief, author and food correspondent for KCBS AM radio in San Francisco
- Andreas Floer (1983–1985, Barrington Hall), German-American mathematician, Floer homology
- Nathan Huggins (1952–1954, Oxford Hall), the first W. E. B. Du Bois Professor of History and Afro-American Studies and Director of the Du Bois Institute for Afro-American Research at Harvard University
- Ed Masuga (1999–2002, Le Chateau), singer, musician, and songwriter
- Norman Mineta (1949–1950, Ridge House), United States Secretary of Transportation under President George W. Bush, namesake of the San Jose International Airport
- Peter Montgomery (1967–1971, Cloyne Court), Mathematician
- Gordon Moore (1950, Cloyne Court), Intel co-founder
- Leon F. Litwack (1948–1951, boarder, Oxford House, Ridge House and Cloyne Court), Pulitzer Prize winner, former University of California, Berkeley History Professor
- Nancy Skinner (California politician), Barrington Hall
- Steve Wozniak (1971–1972), Barrington Hall

== See also ==
- Berkeley Student Food Collective (BSFC)
- North American Students of Cooperation (NASCO)
