= Lucy Ward Stebbins =

American educator (1880–1955)

- Born: 1880; San Francisco, California, U.S.
- Died: January 31, 1955 (aged 74–75)
- Occupation: Professor
- Known for: Dean of Women at University of California, Berkeley

Lucy Ward Stebbins (1880 – January 31, 1955) was the Dean of Women at University of California, Berkeley.

== Biography ==
Lucy Ward Stebbins was born in San Francisco in 1880. She was the daughter of Horatio Stebbins, pastor of the First Unitarian Church of San Francisco and a regent of the University of California.

She matriculated at Berkeley and later transferred to Radcliffe College to receive her A.B. degree. She graduated from Radcliffe in 1902 and worked in Massachusetts as a social worker until 1910, when she returned to Berkeley to become Assistant Dean of Women. In 1912, the former dean, Lucy Sprague Mitchell, retired and Stebbins was appointed Dean of Women.

Stebbins gave the commencement speech at Radcliffe College in 1921.

Stebbins served Berkeley for thirty years. During her time in office, she increased the enrollment of women from 1,200 to 6,400 by raising money for scholarships and expanding curriculum. Stebbins also encouraged women to participate in student government and created housing opportunities. During her tenure, the schools of Nursing and Social welfare were established, as well as the departments of Home Economics and Decorative Arts. Stebbins also founded the Women's Faculty Club, one of the earliest female faculty organizations to exist at a co-ed university.

Upon conferring an honorary LL.D award to her in 1953, President Robert Gordon Sproul described Lucy Ward as "a teacher and dean... who saw clearly into the hearts and minds of students, and stimulated them by precept and example to achieve their highest potential. No single individual has contributed more than you to the personal and general welfare of the University's women, and few have touched helpfully so many phases of our University life."

Berkeley Student Cooperative's Stebbins Hall is named for her. Stebbins was the honored guest and speaker at the Stebbins Institute in 1942, which took place at Stebbins Hall.
