= Berkeley Student Food Collective =

- Founded: 2010
- Type: Food cooperative
- Purpose: Organic food, local food, fair trade, health food, sustainable food, vegetarian food, vegan food, food justice
- Location: Berkeley, California, United States
- Website: www.foodcollective.org

The Berkeley Student Food Collective (BSFC) is a collectively-operated nonprofit grocery market founded by students of the University of California, Berkeley. The 650-square-foot storefront is located across the street from the university, on Bancroft Way.

The market aims to expand access to organic, locally sourced, fair trade and whole foods, including through EBT incentives. The collective also aims to educate its community about food systems and their environmental, social and political impacts; to this end, the organization hosts and supports events for members and the public.

== History ==
In 2009, the national fast food chain Panda Express attempted to open a restaurant on Lower Sproul Plaza on the UC Berkeley campus, an area run by the ASUC student government. Students were angered that a business they considered to be unhealthy, unsustainable and unrepresentative of their community was coming to their space and began a campaign to prevent its opening. A petition against Panda Express gathered 1,300 signatures, and students held demonstrations at ASUC Store Operations Board planning meetings.

This movement inspired students to create their own business that represented their interests and provided better food options for the campus community by creating a grocery storefront. Students won a $91,000 grant from UC Berkeley's The Green Initiative Fund (TGIF). Campus officials referred students to a space once occupied by a nail salon, where they ultimately opened the store on November 15, 2010. Early supporters included Michael Pollan and the Berkeley Student Cooperative. The cooperative was the inspiration for the Cooperative Food Empowerment Directive (CoFED), an organization helping students form sustainable food businesses on college campuses.

Several thousand dollars were stolen from the collective in December 2014, leading to a fundraising campaign.

The collective temporarily closed its storefront during the COVID-19 pandemic.

In 2022, the collective sought to relocate to the student union, across the street from the existing location. Facing opposition from the ASUC Student Union Board, the collective started a petition.

== Storefront ==
The student food collective has a physical store on Bancroft Way, near the UC Berkeley campus. The store offers a variety of produce, prepared foods, snacks, cleaning supplies, and other refrigerated and packaged goods. The physical store is open from Monday to Sunday, with shorter operating hours on Saturday and Sunday. The collective also offers bulk ordering of items normally offered in-store.

The organization previously sold a weekly produce box simply named "The Box", which was available for pickup on campus and included $15 worth of local, organic produce, as well as corresponding recipes. The collective also has a voucher ("pay-it-forward") program to address food insecurity among students.

== Organizational structure ==
The BSFC is run cooperatively, which means that each member has a say in the store's operations. Anyone, not just students, can become a member or shop at the store. There are typically about 150 members per term. Membership is obtained by volunteering in the store or on a committee for two hours a week. In return, members receive a 10% discount on store purchases. Members should attend membership meetings that occur once every two weeks. This is where members get to meet people outside of their committees, share their ideas, and debate and vote on issues that can't be resolved in committees because they require the input of the entire collective. They can also join a committee to meet people with a similar interests and implement BSFC-related projects. There are seven BSFC committees dedicated to education, outreach, policy, food preparation, membership, fundraising, and the storefront. This gives members a chance to work on logistical side of running a cooperative educational grocery store. Being a member also means they can run and vote for board member positions.

=== Board of directors ===
There are fifteen coordinator titles on the board of directors, consisting of publicity, education, membership, fundraising, outreach, food events, product, produce, policy, storefront, communications, information technology, food preparation, events, and finance. Elections occur every semester and the current director may opt to run for reelection. One or two people may serve under one title. The Board of Directors meets weekly to make executive decisions on a consensus basis before bringing items to membership.

== See also ==
- Berkeley Student Cooperative
- List of food cooperatives
