= Casa Zimbabwe =

Student housing cooperative in Berkeley, California, US

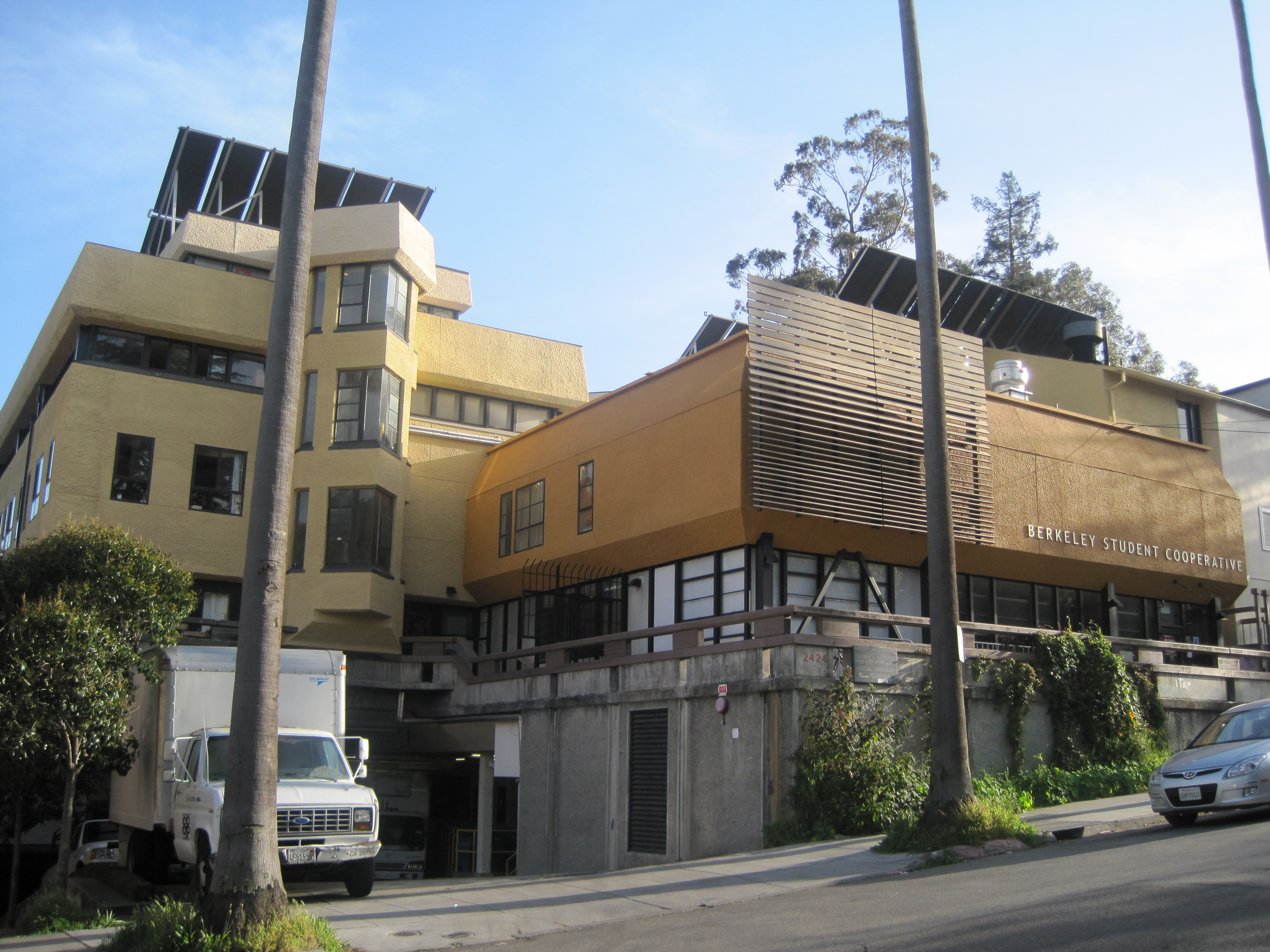
- Interactive map of Casa Zimbabwe

General information
- Location: 2422 Ridge Road, Northside, Berkeley, California 94709
- Coordinates: 37°52′33.276″N 122°15′39.276″W
- Status: Completed
- Category: Student housing cooperative
- Population: 124 residents + additional boarders (academic year), 105 residents (summer) (2019)
- No. of units: 73 bedrooms (34 singles, 27 doubles, 12 triples)

Construction
- Constructed: 1965–1966

Other information
- Governing body: Berkeley Student Cooperative

Casa Zimbabwe, commonly referred to as CZ, is a student housing cooperative in Berkeley, California, housing 124 residents. It is the second largest non-apartment style unit of the Berkeley Student Cooperative (BSC), behind Cloyne Court Hotel. Opened in 1966, it was one of the first co-ed student housing in the nation, as well as the first building intentionally built as a co-op.

Located at 2422 Ridge Road, CZ is a block from the center of the northern edge of the University of California, Berkeley campus. It sits on Northside atop Holy Hill, the area in the vicinity of a five-way intersection surrounded on all sides by churches and seminaries, such as Graduate Theological Union. Joined at the hip with the Ridge House, the building overlooks the North Gate of the university, and its two accessible roofs provide a view of San Francisco, East Bay, Berkeley Hills, and most of the university. The BSC's central office and central kitchen are located in the same building.

== History ==
While every other BSC house was a preexisting structure eventually converted into a co-op, in 1966 the Ridge Project, now Casa Zimbabwe, was built with the intent of a housing a living space, BSC office and the badly needed large kitchen and warehouse. A University Student Cooperative Association (now BSC) fund raising pamphlet stated that:

The one abiding principle in the whole architectural design of Ridge Project has been to build a unit reflecting individuality and freedom, the antithesis of many dormitories. The disadvantages of other dorms, uniformity, regimentation of activities and general impersonality of buildings, have been avoided. The Ridge Project actively promotes diversity, freedom and variety of activities, and a small-scale residential environment.

Planning for the new project began in the late fifties with the BSC raising approximately $650,000 of the $1,500,000 needed to build it. The largest portion of that amount was provided by various foundations grants, in addition BSC received approximately $100,000 from co-op alumni, $35,000 from co-op members and $30,000 from university faculty.

While as a whole the Ridge Project was coed, it had separate male and female wings and a large common area in between. There would be no restrictions on when or where a member of the house could be unless such rules where passed by the members themselves. (Note: There was an exception to this rule, a lock-down rule could be imposed upon girls under 21 upon the request of their parents, with a supervisor being present in the female wing to oversee. This lasted for only one year - a graduate student who turned out to be just as liberal as the students she was supervising. In her honor her old room, a single with its own balcony, is known as "Heidi's room.") One of the first approved motions was to switch members of a floor in the women's wing with a floor from the men's. Segregation of the wings by gender was over by mid 1970s. Casa Zimbabwe's "party house" reputation originated at the Ridge Project almost right after it opened. (Note: CZ has hosted numerous performances, from poet Allen Ginsberg in its first year to bay area punk and rock bands, like Green Day in 1992.) Across the bay from San Francisco its members were at the center of then blossoming hippie movement. Similarly, the political activity present today was even more so during the same years as a large portion of the members where also participating in the Free Speech Movement that originated in Berkeley several years earlier. In 1983, several members petitioned to change house's name to "Casa Zimbabwe." Some felt that the term "project" had a negative association with public housing and that there was a frequent confusion between the names of the Ridge Project and the Ridge House next to it. The name "Casa Zimbabwe" was a reference to independence of South Rhodesia from British rule and creation of Republic of Zimbabwe. Changing the name failed several times before getting approved in 1987.

Every house in BSC has mural painted on its walls. This is especially true in CZ, where almost all of the public walls are painted. However, these were white until the late '70s. According to member folklore the album cover of Pink Floyd's Dark Side of The Moon was the first one painted. By 1990s almost half the walls were covered with art. Many murals had to be removed due to a seismic retrofitting in the spring of 2007.

In the early spring of the 2020 COVID-19 pandemic CZ instituted a self quarantine and no visitors policy. There were approximately 50 members living in the house during that period.

== Members ==
Members of CZ often refer to themselves as "Czars."

Residents of CZ are members of the BSC. Members pay roughly $9,972 in rent for the 2026-27 academic school year, covering full room and board. Like in other houses, each member is required to provide five hours of workshift per week. Council meetings occur weekly for members to discuss house business and vote on decisions. In addition to council, members can attend Board Meetings to discuss and vote on issues regarding the BSC as a whole.

== Design and construction ==
While other BSC houses were preexisting structures, like apartment buildings and hotels, Casa Zimbabwe is unique in that it was built with intent of being used as a cooperative living space. CZ's east wing is four stories high and west wing is three, the two wings were offset by half a floor with the intention of making the house look less like a formal college dormitory. The BSC administrative office is in a separate part of the building, its connected at the hip to the older Ridge House. East and west wings are the living spaces, with the two wings being connected by two stories of wide common space. Many of the rooms provide sweeping views of San Francisco, East Bay, Berkeley Hills, and most of the university. A court yard lays in between Ridge house, administrative section and the east and west wings. Both of the wings' roofs are also common spaces. Forty solar panels were added to them in 1979 to supply hot water. CZ was temporary closed for seismic retrofitting in the spring of 2007. An elevator was also installed to make the building more wheelchair accessible.

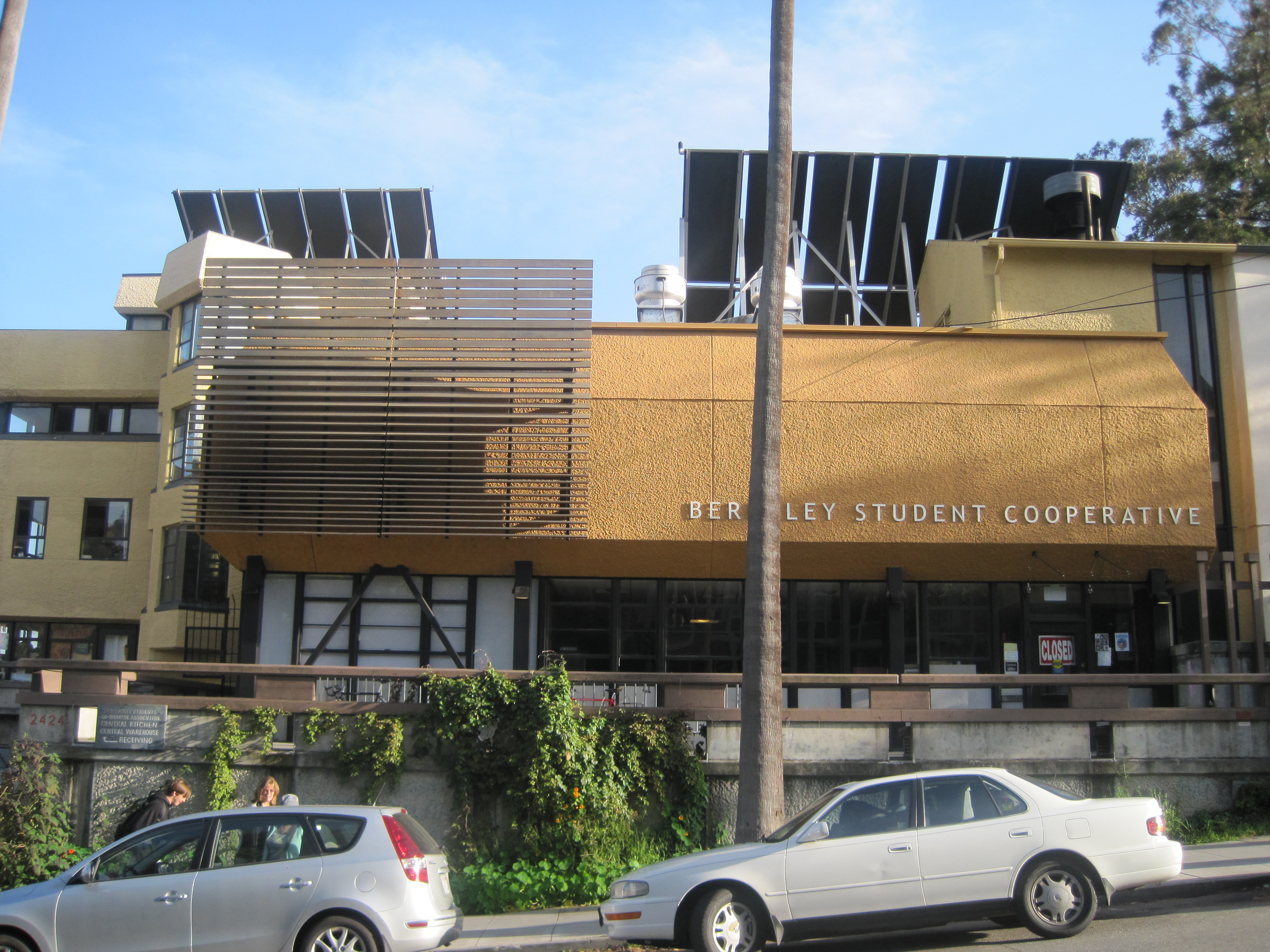

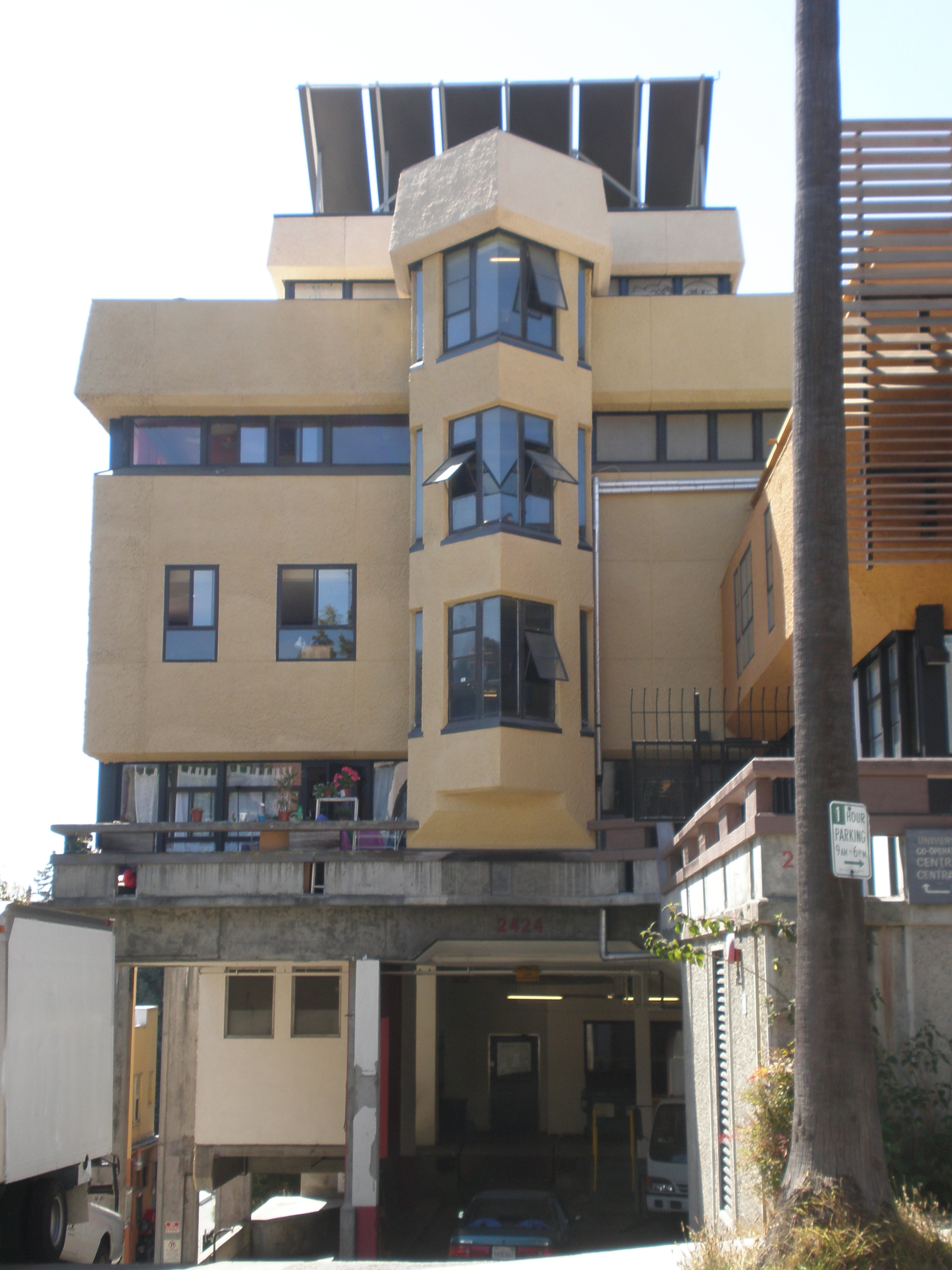

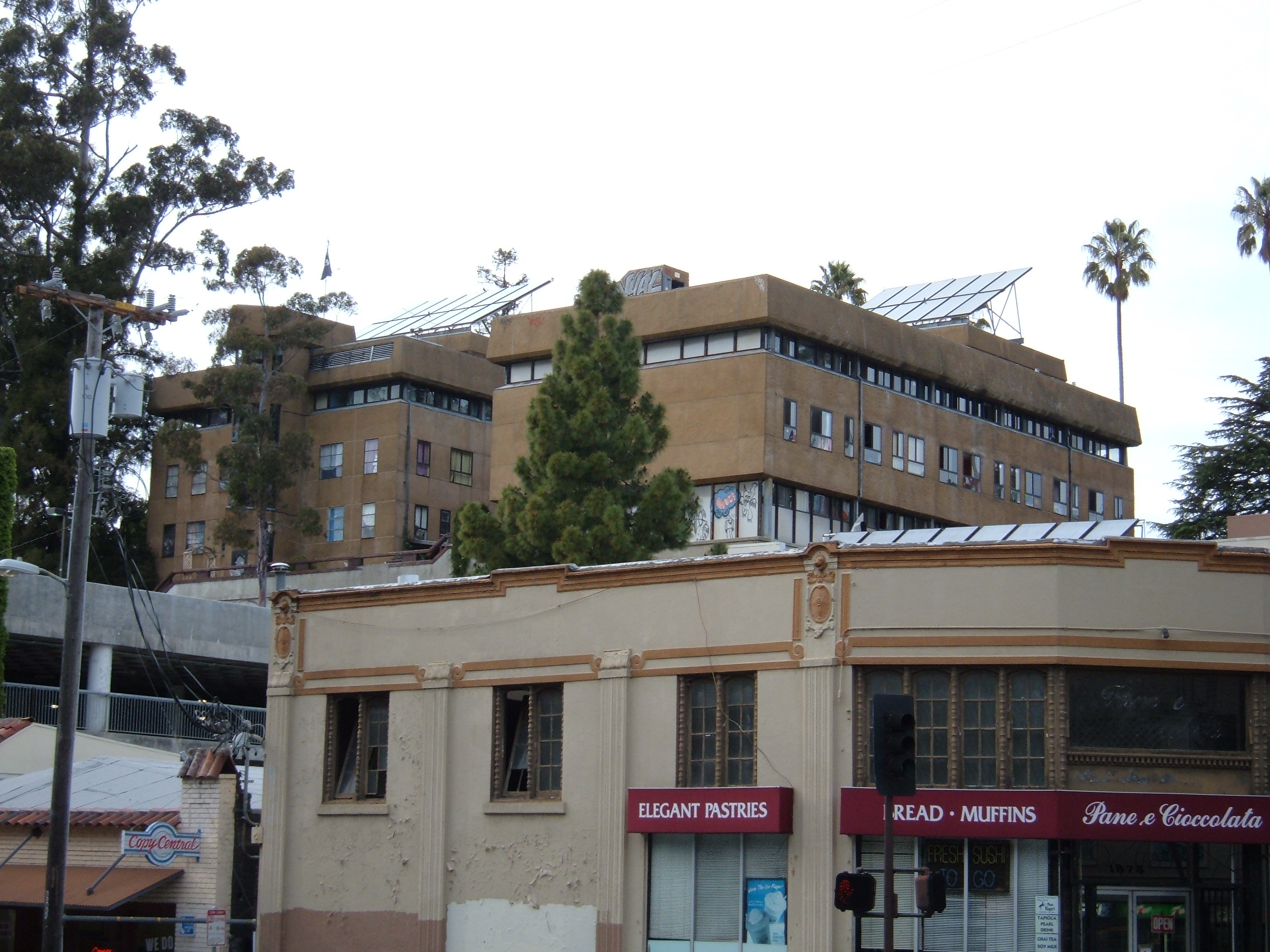

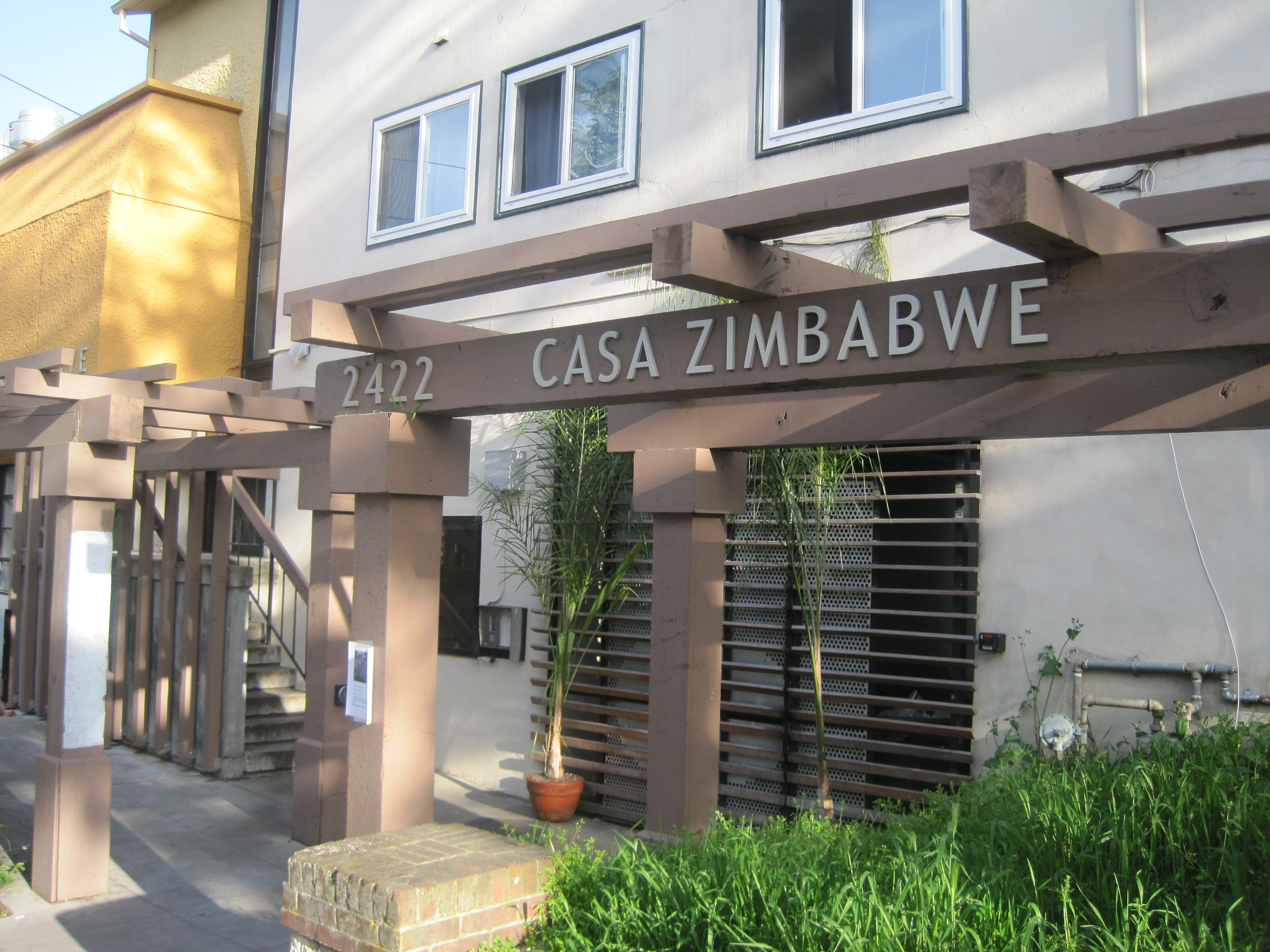

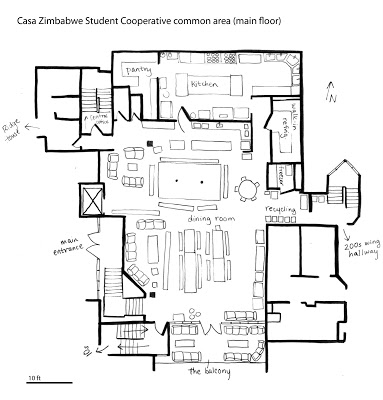
Common space 2011

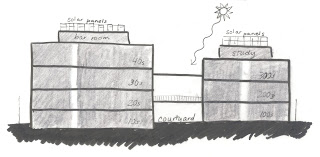
Sectional diagram

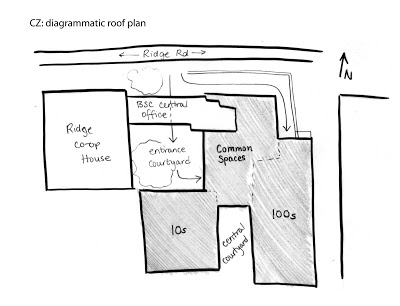
Schematic roof plan
