= 1923 Berkeley, California, fire =

Conflagration that consumed 640 structures

Coordinates: 37.89°N 122.25°W

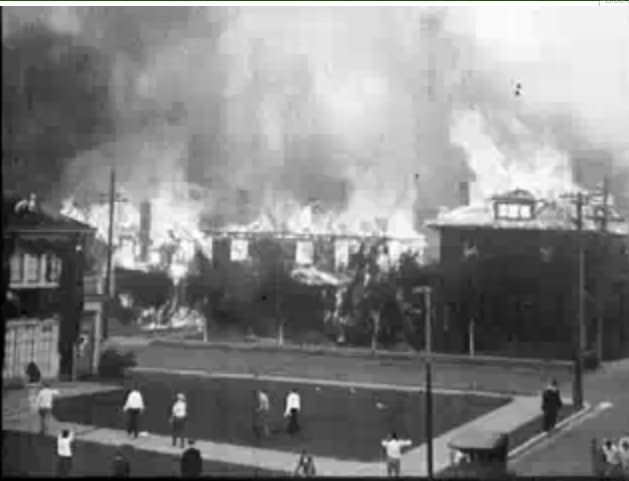
- A frame from a newsreel documenting the fire
- Date: September 17, 1923
- Location: Berkeley, California, U.S.

Statistics
- Burned area: Unknown

Impacts
- Deaths: 0
- Injuries: Unknown
- Structures destroyed: 640
- Cost: Estimated at $10,000,000

Ignition
- Cause: Undetermined

The 1923 Berkeley, California, fire was a conflagration that consumed some 640 structures, including 584 houses in the densely built neighborhoods north of the campus of the University of California, Berkeley on September 17, 1923.

== Course ==
Although the exact cause was never determined, the fire began in the undeveloped chaparral and grasslands of Wildcat Canyon, just east of the ridgeline of the Berkeley Hills, and was propelled over the ridge and southwestward just south of Codornices Creek by a strong, gusty, and intensely dry northeasterly wind. The fire quickly blew up as it swept through the La Loma Park and Northside neighborhoods of Berkeley, overwhelming the capabilities of the Berkeley Fire Department to stop it. The house at 125 Shasta Road was the first to be destroyed in the fire. A number of UC students fought the advance of the fire as it approached the north edge of the University of California campus, at Hearst Avenue. The other edge of the fire was fought by firefighters as it advanced on downtown Berkeley along the east side of Shattuck Avenue north of University Avenue. Firefighters were rushed in from neighboring Oakland, and San Francisco sent firefighters by ferry across the bay.

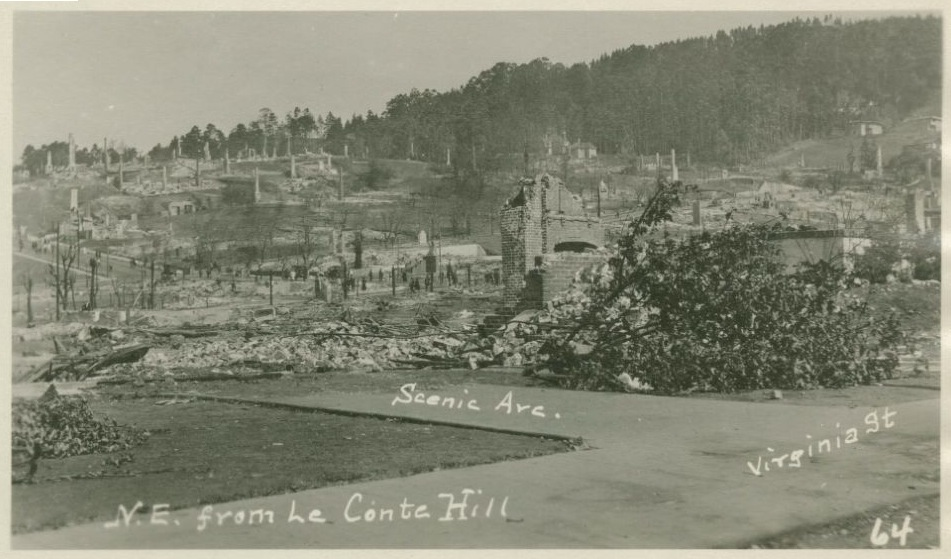
Intersection of Scenic Ave. and Virginia St. right after the fire

Firefighting efforts were hampered by the inadequacy of water mains in northern Berkeley, where rapid development after the 1906 San Francisco earthquake had outgrown the water supply in the fire area. Firefighters trying to fight the fire connected to hydrants in the area that hissed dry. An additional problem was the predominance of cedar shake (rough shingle) roofs. However, according to Audrey Boyd in The Berkeley Fire, "rivers of water could have been poured into that blaze without deterring it." The strong and dry wind lifted burning shakes off burning houses and quickly spread the fire. The fire was halted only when the northeasterly winds died down and were replaced by the cool, humid afternoon sea breeze. The fire lines were established at Hearst and Shattuck Avenues, where larger water mains delivered a reliable water supply for firefighting.

The total loss was estimated at $10,000,000 by the National Board of Fire Underwriters.

== Aftermath ==
Building styles in North Berkeley changed dramatically after the 1923 fire, with stucco and tile roof homes largely, but not entirely, replacing the wood-sided and cedar-shaked construction styles popularized by the Berkeley Hillside Club before the fire.

As a belated result of the fire, the City of Berkeley constructed a fire station in the hills at 2931 Shasta Road (at Queens Road) just below Grizzly Peak Blvd, in 1948. In the early 2000s, this station was replaced and relocated to a nearby site just above Grizzly Peak Blvd. at 3000 Shasta Road, on the interface between the residential area and Tilden Regional Park, very close to the putative origin of the 1923 fire.

== See also ==
- Oakland firestorm of 1991
