= Rochdale Village (Berkeley, California) =

Apartment complex in Berkeley, California

Coordinates: 37°51′57″N 122°15′34″W

Rochdale Village is student housing cooperative apartment complex in Berkeley, California. The property is owned by UC Berkeley and leased by the Berkeley Student Cooperative (BSC). It was built during the late 1960s and early 1970s, with money loaned by the Department of Housing and Urban Development to the BSC (then known as the University Student's Cooperative Association). With approximately 260 residents, it is the largest housing co-op in Berkeley and one of the largest student housing cooperatives in the world. It lies at an elevation of 236 feet (72 m).
