= Hillside Club =

Coordinates: 37.8751°N 122.26018°W

- Berkeley Hillside Club
- U.S. National Register of Historic Places
- Berkeley Landmark
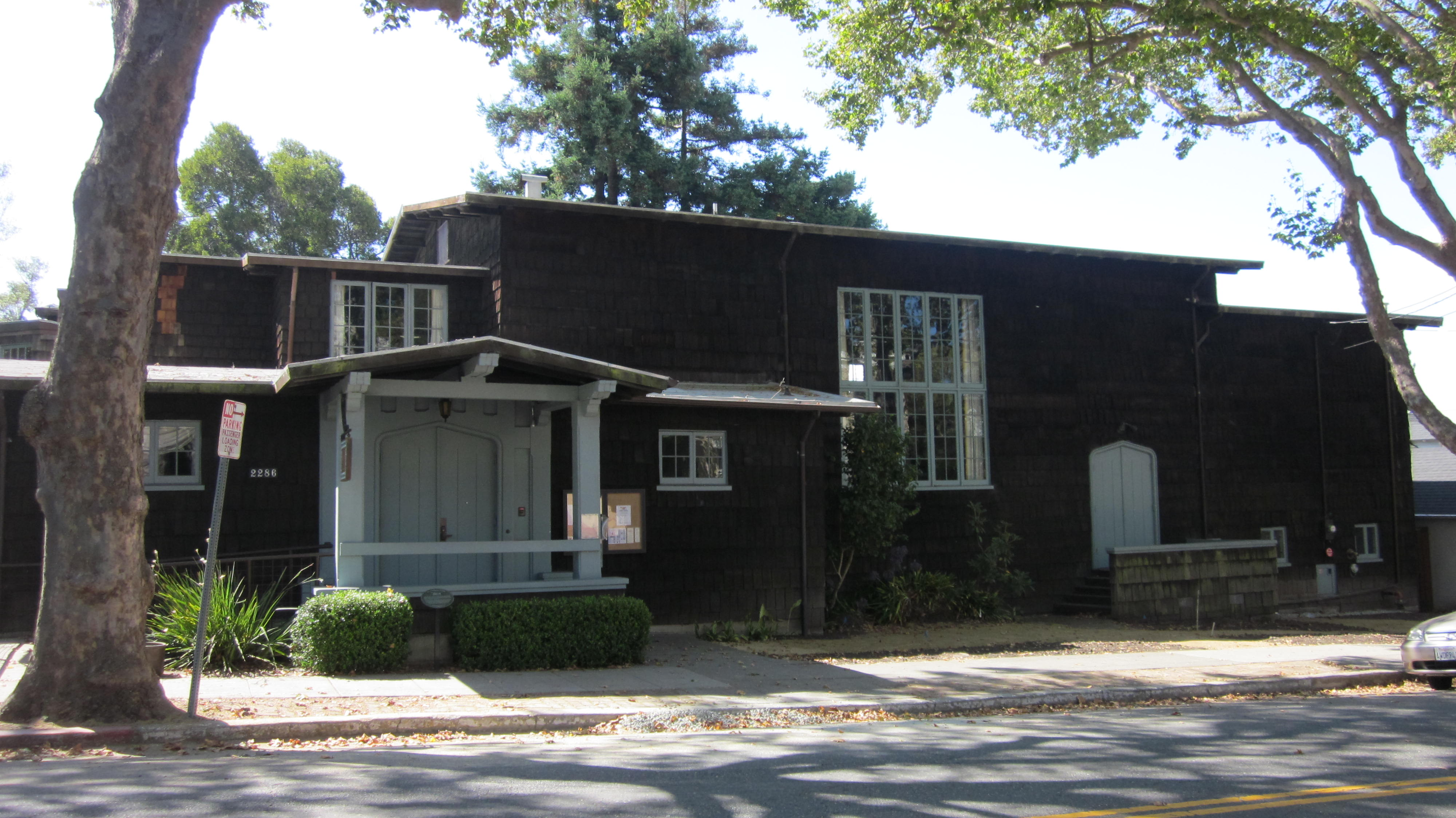
- Location: 2286 Cedar Street, Berkeley, California, U.S.
- NRHP reference No.: 04000332
- BERKL No.: 266

Significant dates
- Added to NRHP: April 16, 2004
- Delisted BERKL: January 12, 2004

The Hillside Club is a neighborhood social club established in 1898 by residents of Berkeley, California's newly formed Northside neighborhood to protect the hills from unsightly grading and unsuitable buildings. It took its cue from the Arts and Crafts movement. The building is listed on the National Register of Historic Places since April 16, 2004, under the name "Berkeley Hillside Club"; and listed as a Berkeley Landmark (no. 266) by the city since January 12, 2004.

== History ==
Prominent early club members included architects Bernard Maybeck and John Galen Howard, author Charles Keeler, and the journalist Frank Morton Todd.

Maybeck designed the original 1906 clubhouse, which was destroyed in the 1923 Berkeley Fire. John White, Maybeck's brother-in-law, designed the current clubhouse in 1924. Among the club's first projects was the construction of Hillside Elementary School for the Berkeley Public Schools.

== See also ==
- National Register of Historic Places listings in Alameda County, California
