= Charles Keeler =

American poet

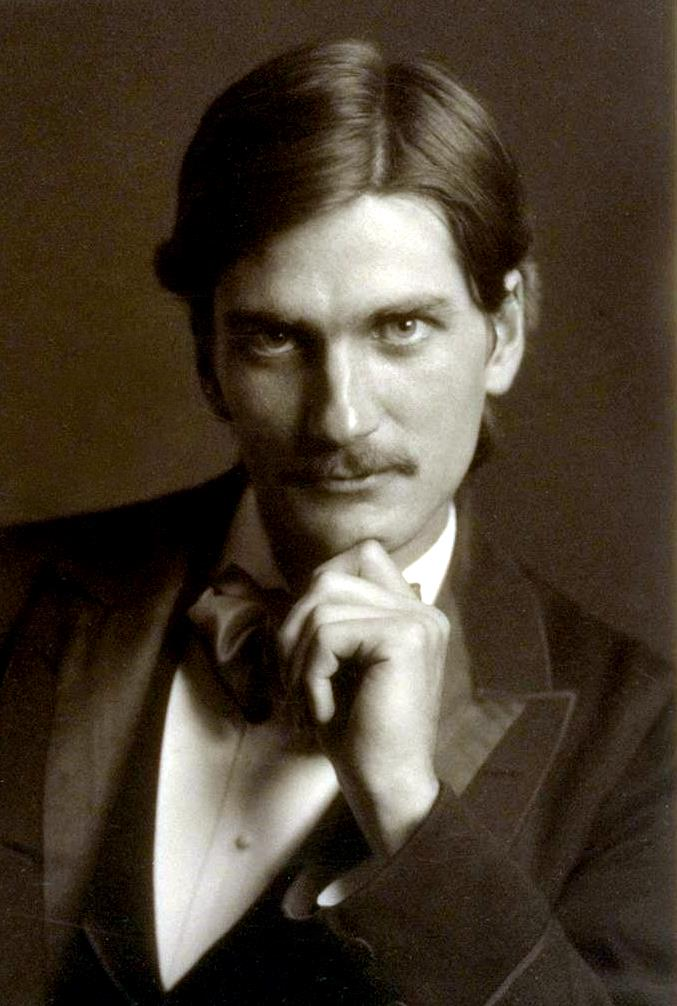
Keeler circa 1895

Charles Augustus Keeler (October 7, 1871 – July 31, 1937) was an American author, poet, ornithologist and advocate for the arts, particularly architecture.

== Biography ==
=== Early life ===
Keeler was born on October 7, 1871, in Milwaukee, Wisconsin. He moved to Berkeley with his family in 1887. He studied biology at UC Berkeley, where he was a member of Beta Theta Pi fraternity and the organizer of an Evolution Club.

=== Career ===
Keeler was hired in 1891 by the California Academy of Sciences in San Francisco and became director of its natural history museum.

That same year, he met the architect Bernard Maybeck on the commuter ferry. They became friends, and in 1895 Keeler asked Maybeck to design his home, in the Berkeley Hills on Highland Place, just north of the UC campus in North Berkeley. It was Maybeck's first residential commission, the first of many redwood-clad hillside homes designed by Maybeck, and the first in a cluster of influential First Bay Tradition houses in Berkeley, designed to blend in with their natural setting. Maybeck also designed a studio structure for Keeler near the house in 1902.

The desire of Keeler, Maybeck and others to promote locally this kind of architecture integrated with nature, in keeping with Arts and Crafts movement ideals, prompted creation of a Ruskin Club in Berkeley in 1895 and the Hillside Club in 1898. Although the Hillside Club was originally started by a group of women, men were soon admitted, and Keeler became its first secretary (1902–1903) and second president (1903–1905). He laid out his ideas for a new style of residence "infused with the art spirit" in his 1904 book The Simple Home, which became a manifesto of sorts for the club and is considered Keeler's most significant book. In 1905 he was one of the founders, along with Alfred L. Kroeber and George Rapall Noyes of a "Berkeley Folk-Lore Club" and then the California Branch of the American Folk-Lore Society, of which he soon became president. In 1907 he was elected president of a newly organized Studio Club of Berkeley. He associated with many of the artists in the local colony, especially the “art photographers,” and used them as actors in the plays he produced at the Hillside Club. Keeler even served as a model for Adelaide Hanscom Leeson’s photo illustrations in Omar Khayyam’s "Rubaiyat".

In the 1890s and early 1900s he was active in the First Unitarian Church of Berkeley, directing its Sunday school program. Keeler joined the Bohemian Club in 1902 and wrote the Cremation of Care ceremony for their 1913 encampment. He was also a member of the Author's Club of London and the New York Author's Club. In 1921-23 he was president of the California Writers Club.

He was friends with many influential naturalists and outdoorsmen, including John Muir, John Burroughs, painter William Keith and developer Duncan McDuffie—men who today would be called environmentalists. He was a charter member of the Sierra Club.

He was a lifelong adventurer. In 1893 he took a trip around Cape Horn on the clipper ship Charmer. In 1899, Keeler was invited to join other elite scientists on the Harriman Alaska Expedition, to study and document the coast of Alaska. He and his family voyaged to the South Pacific in 1900–1901, visiting Tahiti, New Zealand, Australia, Samoa and Hawaii. In 1911-12 he took a worldwide poetry reading tour; he read before Queen Liliuokalani in Hawaii and the Emperor of Japan, and was a house guest of the Hindu poet Sarojini Naidu in Hyderabad, India. In 1913 he settled in New York City, where he presented poetry readings, original plays, and "dance poems" in which his reading would be accompanied by music, and original dances by fellow Californian Maud Madison.

In 1917, he returned to Berkeley and moved into a cottage he had built in 1909, alongside an outdoor amphitheater with seating for 300. He produced theater parties there for soldiers and sailors on leave from World War I. In 1921, he was hired as managing director of the Berkeley Chamber of Commerce and quickly organized both a Manufacturers' and Merchants' Fair and a three-day Berkeley Music Festival. He hoped to develop Berkeley as an increasingly prominent center for literature and the arts. He also began teaching English at the A to Zed School in Berkeley by 1921.

He was a spiritual seeker all his life, and eventually formulated the idea of starting a new religion. He founded the First Berkeley Cosmic Society in 1925 and the same year published a book outlining his view of a new "Cosmic Religion" based on a common bond shared by all religions, "the trinity of love, truth and beauty."

In the late 1920s and 1930s, he wrote scripts for two popular radio serials, "Skipper Brown's Yarns" and "The O'Flanagan Family."

=== Family ===
He married Louise Mapes Bunnell (1872–1907) in 1893. Louise was a talented artist and illustrated several of his books of poetry. They had three children: Merodine, Leonarde (co-inventor of the polygraph) and Eloise. Louise died in 1907, and in 1921 he married Ormeida Curtis Harrison (1875–1947), a poet and assistant principal of the A-Zed School.

=== Death ===
He died of a heart attack on July 31, 1937, at his private residence in Berkeley. A memorial service was held at the First Unitarian Church using a Cosmic Society funeral ritual. Keeler Avenue in Berkeley, California, is named after him.

== Works ==
- Evolution of the Colors of North American Land Birds (1893)
- A Light Through the Storm (1894, verse, illustrated by Louise Keeler)
- The Promise of the Ages (1896, verse)
- Southern California (1898, illustrated by Louise Keeler, for Santa Fe Railway)
- Bird Notes Afield: A Series of Essays on the Birds of California (1899)
- A Season's Sowing (1899, verse, illustrated by Louise Keeler)
- Idyls of El Dorado (1900, verse, illustrated by Louise Keeler)
- A Wanderer's Songs of the Sea (1902, verse)
- San Francisco and Thereabout (1903, cover and decorations by Louise Keeler)
- Elfin Songs of Sunland (1904, verse for children, decorations by Louise Keeler)
- The Simple Home (1904)
- A Light Through the Storm (1904, verse, illustrated by Louise Keeler and with photogravures of paintings by William Keith)
- San Francisco Through Earthquake and Fire (1906)
- The Victory: Poems of Triumph (verse, 1916)
- Sequoia Sonnets (verse, 1919, illustrated by daughter Merodine Keeler)
- An Epitome of Cosmic Religion (1925)
