= Cloyne Court Hotel =

- U.S. National Register of Historic Places
- Berkeley Landmark
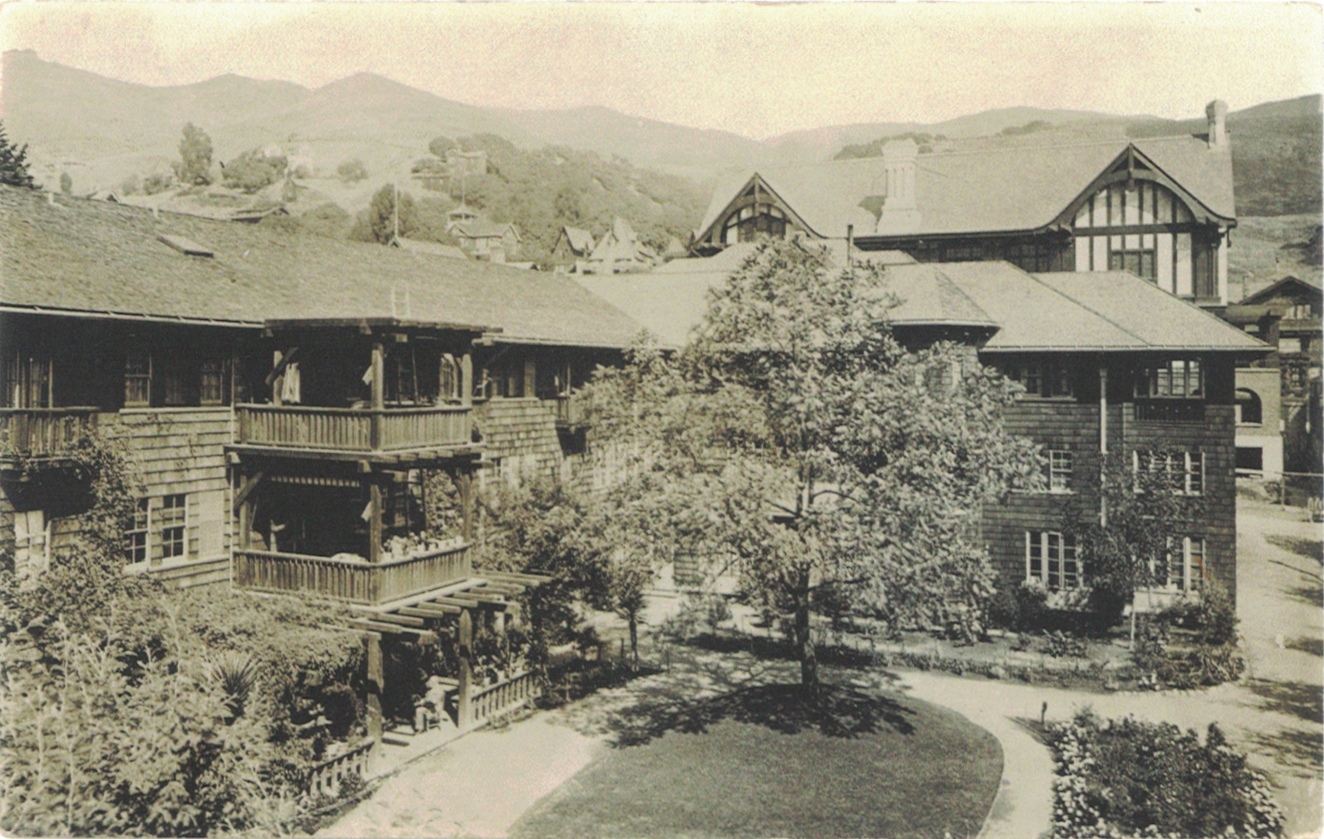

- Location within Oakland, California Location within California Location within the United States
- Location: 2600 Ridge Rd., Berkeley, California
- Coordinates: 37°52′33″N 122°15′26″W
- Area: less than one acre
- Built: 1904
- Architect: John Galen Howard
- Architectural style: San Francisco Bay Tradition
- NRHP reference No.: 92001718
- BERKL No.: 65

Significant dates
- Added to NRHP: December 24, 1992
- Designated BERKL: November 15, 1982

The Cloyne Court Hotel, often referred to simply as Cloyne, is a historical landmark in Berkeley, California, and currently one of the houses of the Berkeley Student Cooperative (BSC), a student housing cooperative. It is located at the north side of the University of California, Berkeley campus at 2600 Ridge Road, near Soda Hall and Jacobs Hall, and is the next door neighbor of the Goldman School of Public Policy.

The building is owned by the Regents of the University of California.

== History ==
"Cloyne Court was designed by campus architect John Galen Howard in 1904 as a luxury residential hotel for visiting scholars."

Cloyne Court, named after Cloyne, the village in Ireland where George Berkeley was bishop, was built in 1904 for $80,000 by the University Land and Improvement Company, which included several University professors, University benefactresses Phoebe Apperson Hearst and Jane K. Sather, future Regent James K. Moffit, Dr. Louis Lisser, John L. Howard, Warren Olney, Dr. Kasper Pishel, Louis Titus, John Galen Howard, the architect of the building and James M. Pierce, the later owner of the hotel. The building, described as a "high-class, modern apartment house," originally contained 32 suites, each with bath, that were not connected by common hallways, but rather were paired onto private stairways to the first floor public areas. Each section was separated by heavy brick firewalls with automatic fireproof doors and each suite was wired for telephone. In 1911, the music room (today called lib-ed room) was added to the building, directly opposite the main entrance, which hosted numerous lectures and music recitals.

The building was one of a rare few to survive the devastating 1923 Berkeley fire, remarkable also because the building is made of redwood and all of the buildings had (and still have) wood shake siding and roofs.

Pierce and his family purchased Cloyne Court - Apartment-Hotel from the investors and managed it from its opening in 1904 until 1914. The family continued operating the hotel until it was sold in 1946.

Notable residents included Lizzie Glide, Mrs. George Morton Randall, Mrs. Henry M. Black, John Frederick Wolle, Anna Miller Wood, and Liberty Hyde Bailey, and guests included Francis E. Leupp, Charles Zueblin, Ludwig Boltzmann, James Mark Baldwin, Susan B. Anthony, and Edgar Odell Lovett.

The services and hospitality at Cloyne Court were always highly complimented by the many visitors who had the pleasure of staying at the hotel. Registered compliments in the hotel guest book include:

- Cloyne Court - Silence and peace in an insane world. - Ernest Bloch, 1944
- Cloyne Court, a haven and a place where the gentle art of hospitality is made manifest to the unknown stranger as well as to the great ones of our day. - Mary Lambert, 1942
- Giving people a happy home is a divine service. - Benjamin Ide Wheeler, 1923
- I came a stranger, stayed a guest and departed a friend. - unknown

Cloyne Court was sold by the Pierce family in 1946 to the University Students' Cooperative Association (today Berkeley Student Cooperative) for $125,000. That year, 15 men occupied the new co-op house alongside the previous residents, whom the USCA had agreed to not displace but rather to allow to continue to live in the residence. Cloyne originally housed all men who often held dances and dined with the women of nearby Stebbins Hall and Hoyt Hall, both all-female co-ops at the time. In 1972, Cloyne Court became a co-ed house.

In 1970, the USCA was forced to sell the property to the Regents of the University of California, upon the threat of an eminent domain acquisition by the University, in exchange for a peppercorn lease, most recently renewed in July 2005.

The building was named a City of Berkeley Landmark in 1982, and placed in the National Register of Historic Places in 1992.

On December 21, 2008, Cloyne Court was closed temporarily for earthquake renovations. It reopened at the beginning of the Fall 2009 semester.

In 2010, John Gibson, then a 21-year-old resident, suffered extensive brain damage and lapsed into a coma, reportedly as a result of a cocaine overdose, in his room. Gibson's family filed suit, claiming his housemates failed to call 911 in time to assist him. The BSC settled the lawsuit and agreed to programmatic changes at Cloyne. In fall 2014, Cloyne reopened as the BSC's substance-free house theme house. Prior members were forced to move out, with only one member allowed to stay after appeal.

== Co-op ==
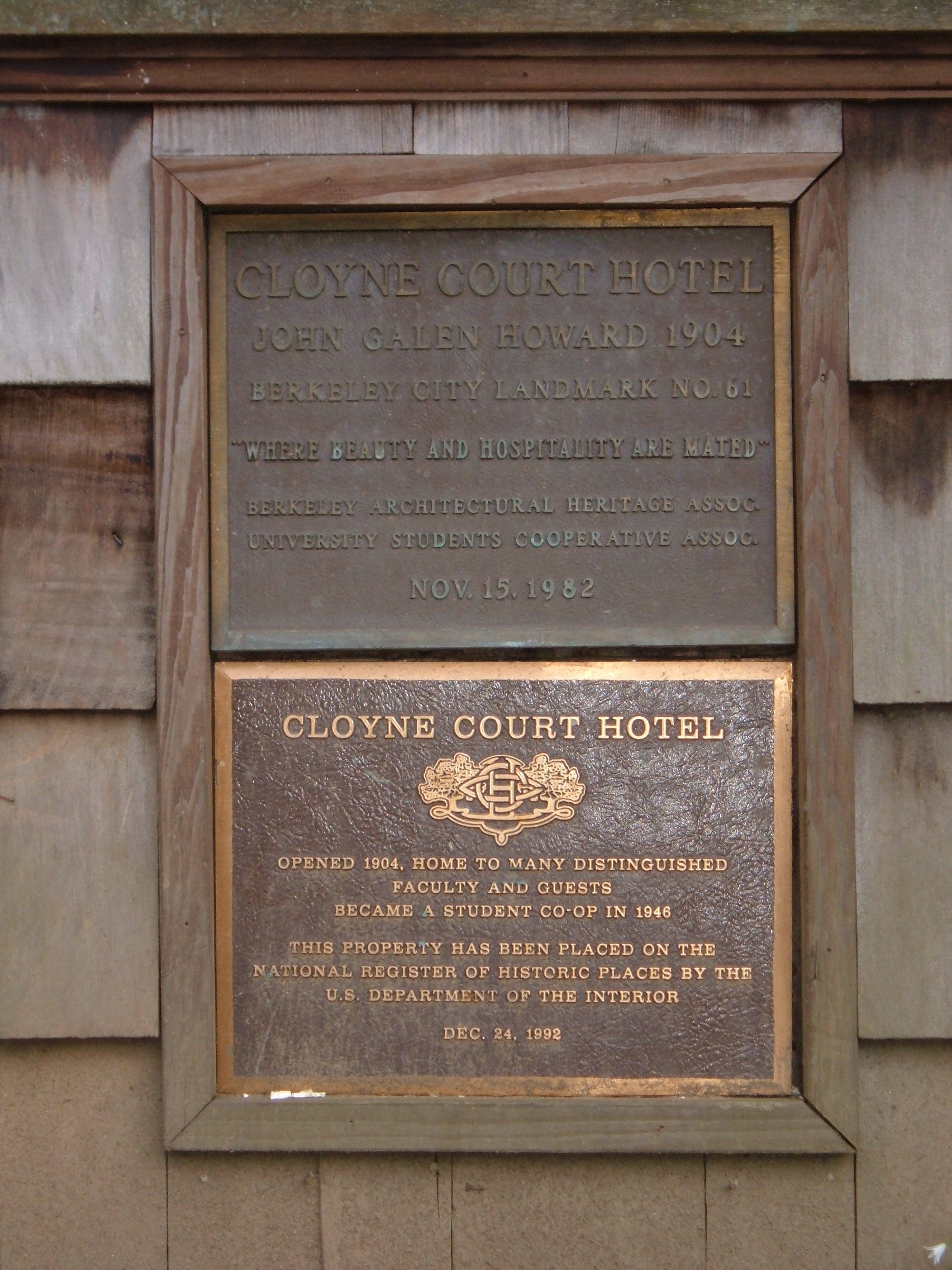

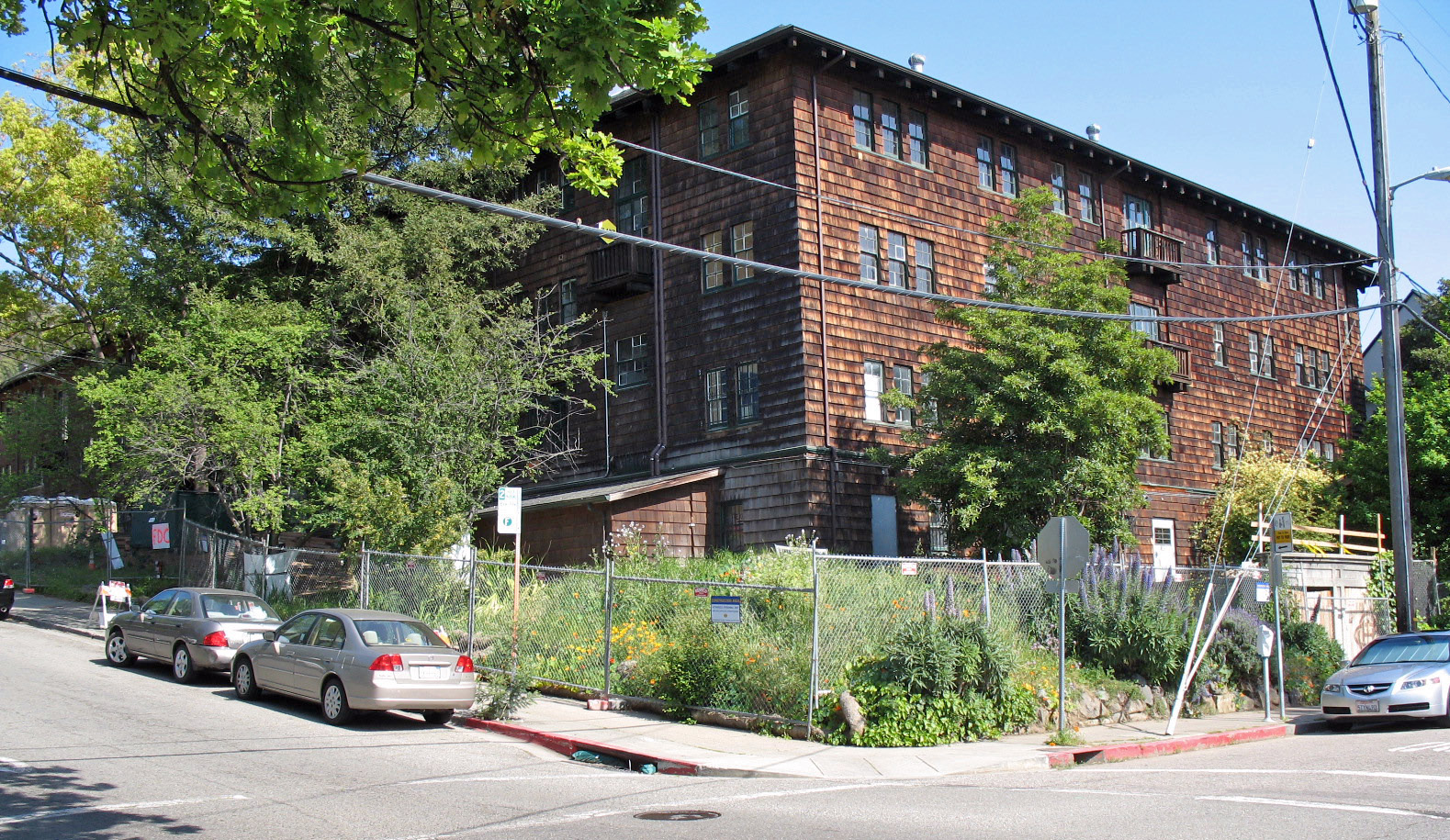

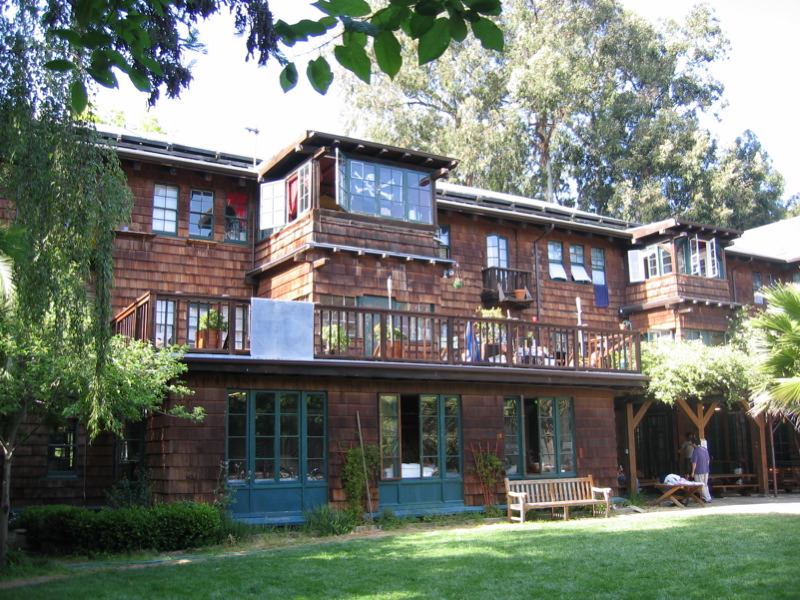

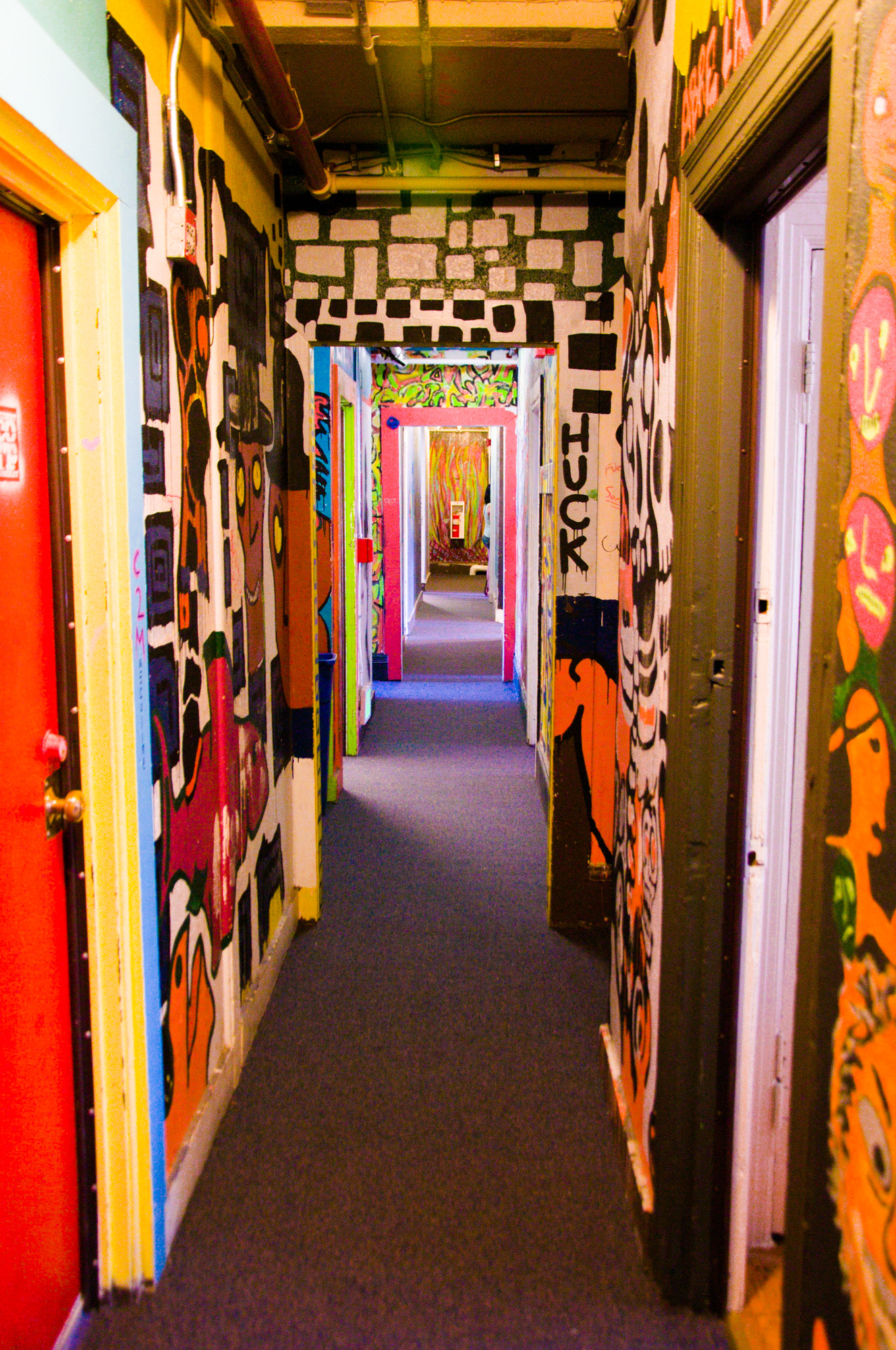

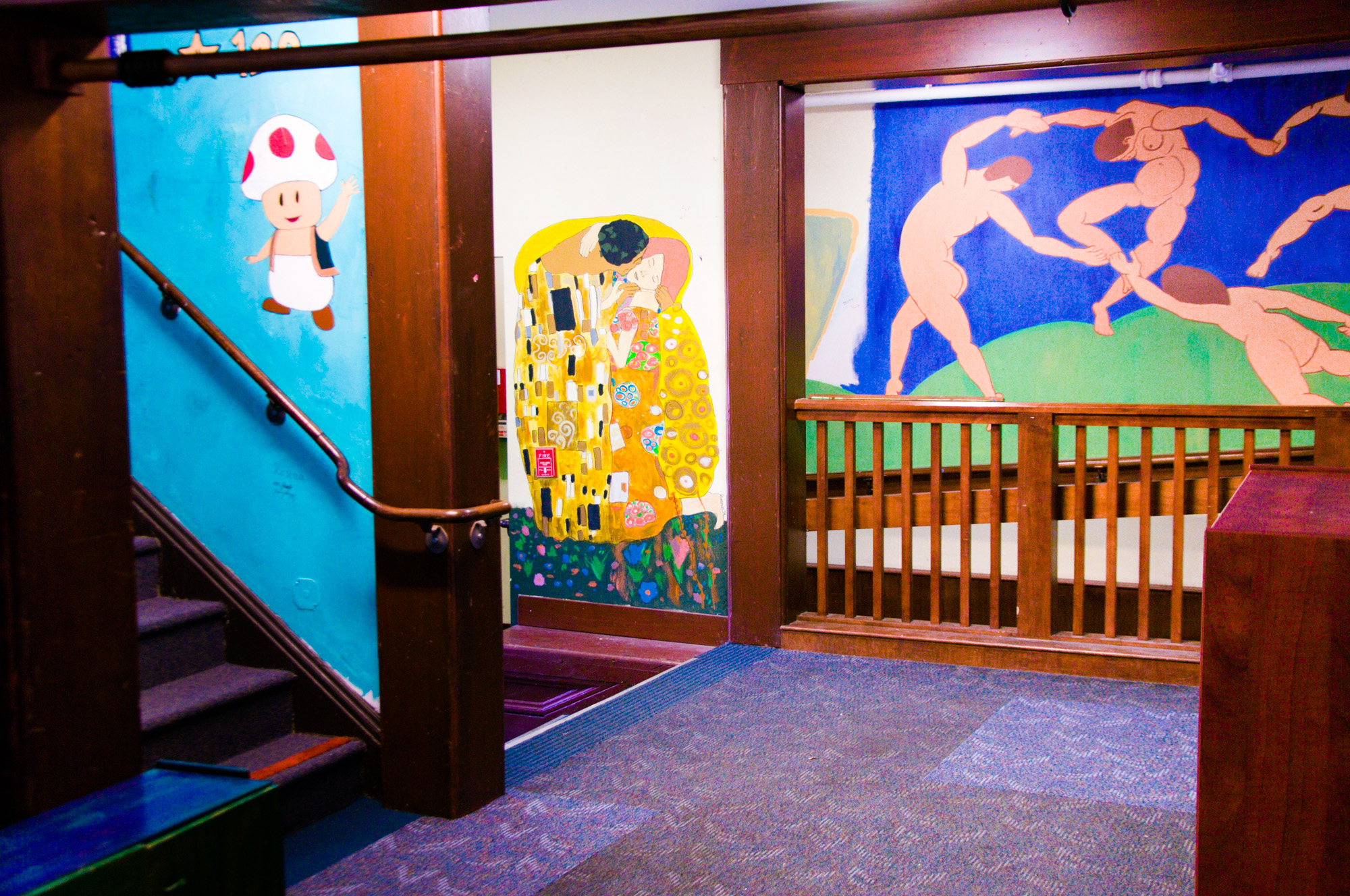

Cloyne is the largest non-apartment style property in the BSC, the largest housing co-op organization in North America. Cloyne houses 140 UC Berkeley students (119 during summer), mostly undergraduates. Because it is owned by, and leased on University of California land, only UC students are eligible as residents.

Despite its size the house is student-run and student-governed. Members contribute 5 hours of workshift per week each for various tasks needed for the operation of the house: cooking, cleaning, house maintenance, gardening, etc. Since July 2005, a facility manager employed by the students and the BSC lives on the premises to help with day-to-day operations of the house. Every weekday and on Sundays members cook a communal dinner, and on Saturdays there is a communal brunch. House's council, house's governing body where all members democratically make decisions pertaining the house, meets every Sunday.

As the academic theme house of the BSC system, Cloyne has an increased number of studious spaces and lectures, including study rooms, a library, a makerspace/hackerspace (a rare case where members can both hack and live in the same building), and many lectures given by guest lecturers and members themselves. A common practice is also informal visits of UC Berkeley professors at communal dinners, allowing members to get to know them through a less formal setting. An example of a UC Berkeley faculty member visiting Cloyne is popular EECS professor John DeNero, who regularly presented about the joys of data for many semesters.

The house is known for its murals covering many of its internal walls. Murals have been made through years by members residing in the house.

== Music scene ==
Cloyne has played a notable role in the Bay Area music scene. The bands No Doubt, Elliott Smith, Green Day, Operation Ivy, The Offspring, Rancid, Primus, 24-7 Spyz, Save Ferris, Skankin' Pickle, The Mr. T Experience, Two Gallants, Blüchunks and Rilo Kiley played at Cloyne before becoming well known. The house also hosted several lesser-known bands during its many events, presenting as many as a dozen bands in a single evening, commonly using two separate stages, though sometimes as many as four: the dining room, the lib-ed room, the basement, and the courtyard.

== See also ==
- Barrington Hall (Berkeley, California)
- North Gate Hall, a similar design by John Galen Howard

== Sources ==
- Bender, Richard, Director. Campus Historic Resources Inventory, Berkeley University of California Planning Office, 1978.
- Brechin, Gray. "Architectural heritage..." The Berkeley Gazette. 12 January 1977.
- Cloyne Court Collection, ms. no. 75/35 c Bancroft Library, University of California.
- City of Berkeley Landmark Application compiled by Anthony Bruce. 20 September 1982.
- National Register of Historic Places Registration Form, compiled by Charles Bucher, Jr. with revisions and editing by Susan Cerny and Lesley Emmington. 8 June 1992.
