= List of neighborhoods in Berkeley =

This is a list of neighborhoods in Berkeley, California.

- The Berkeley Hills – Roughly bounded by Cedar Street, Spruce Street, Eunice Street, Sutter Street, and Arlington Avenue on the west, and Tilden Regional Park on the east.
  - La Loma Park/Nut Hill – Roughly bounded by Euclid Avenue on the west and the main University of California campus on the south.
  - Cragmont – The Berkeley Hills section north of Codornices Creek, and east of about Euclid Avenue.
  - Southampton – Roughly bounded by Arlington Avenue on the west, Tilden Regional Park on the east, and Marin Avenue on the south.
- Central Berkeley/The Berkeley Flats (as contrasted with the Berkeley Hills) – This area encompasses the gently sloping flat land bounded by Martin Luther King Jr Way, Sacramento Street, Cedar Street and Dwight Way. The Elevation decreases smoothly from 180 feet above sea level at the eastern boundary to 100 feet above sea level at the western boundary.
- Claremont – centered on the intersection of Claremont Avenue, Ashby Avenue, and Claremont Boulevard. Parts of the Claremont district are in the City of Oakland, including most of:
  - Claremont Hills – Roughly bounded by Tunnel Road and the Claremont Hotel.
- Downtown Berkeley – Roughly bounded by Martin Luther King Jr Way, Hearst Avenue, Oxford Street, and Dwight Way, and centered along Shattuck Avenue.
- Elmwood – Roughly bounded by Dwight Way, Telegraph Avenue and the Oakland city limits.
- North Berkeley – Roughly bounded by Hearst Avenue and Eunice Street.
  - Gourmet Ghetto – A stretch of Shattuck Avenue and Walnut roughly bordered by Hearst to the south and Rose to the north. So named because of the concentration of fine restaurants, including Chez Panisse and the Cheese Board Collective.
- Northbrae – Roughly bounded by Solano Avenue on the north, Hopkins and Eunice Streets on the south, the Albany city limits on the west, and Spruce Street on the east.
- Northside – Roughly bordered by Hearst Avenue and Cedar Street.
  - Holy Hill – A hill west of Euclid and north of Hearst that includes numerous seminaries and graduate programs associated with the Graduate Theological Union.
- Panoramic Hill – Bounded by Piedmont Avenue, the Clark Kerr Campus and the main University of California campus. The eastern half of this neighborhood is in the City of Oakland.
- South Berkeley – Roughly bounded by Telegraph Avenue, Dwight Way, and the Oakland city limits.
  - Harmon Tract – Centered on the intersection of Sacramento Street and Harmon Street.
  - LeConte District – Bounded by Telegraph, Dwight, Shattuck, and Ashby, named for the LeConte Elementary School in the District
  - Lorin District – Centered on the intersection of Alcatraz Avenue and Adeline Street.
- Southside – Between Bancroft Way and Dwight Way.
- Thousand Oaks – Roughly bounded by Solano Avenue, The Alameda, and Arlington Avenue
- The University of California, Berkeley campus
- West Berkeley – Roughly bounded by San Francisco Bay on the west, and San Pablo Avenue or Sacramento Street on the east.
  - Berkeley Marina
  - Ocean View – Located around the Fourth Street shopping district; roughly bounded by Gilman Street on the north, University Avenue on the south, San Pablo Avenue on the east, and the San Francisco Bay on the west.
  - Poet's Corner – The neighborhood bordered by University Ave, Sacramento Street, Dwight Way, and San Pablo Avenue. Most of the streets that lie exclusively within the boundaries of this neighborhood are named after poets: Bonar, Browning, Byron, Chaucer, Cowper, Edwards and Poe. Poet's corner is home to Strawberry Creek Park. The name Poet's Corner originated in the 2000s. Earlier residents have referred to it as SUDS (Sacramento–-University–-Dwight Way–-San Pablo).
- Westbrae – Centered on the intersection of Santa Fe Avenue and Gilman Street. Generally bounded by Cedar Street to the South, San Pablo Avenue to the west, Sacramento Street and Saint Mary's school to the east, and Albany city limits to the north.
