= Watch Over Me (disambiguation) =

Watch Over Me is an American television series.

Watch Over Me may also refer to:

- Watch Over Me (novel)
- "Watch Over Me" (song)
- "Watch Over Me" (NCIS: New Orleans)

== See also ==
- Someone to Watch Over Me (disambiguation)
