= Shattuck Avenue =

Street in California, United States

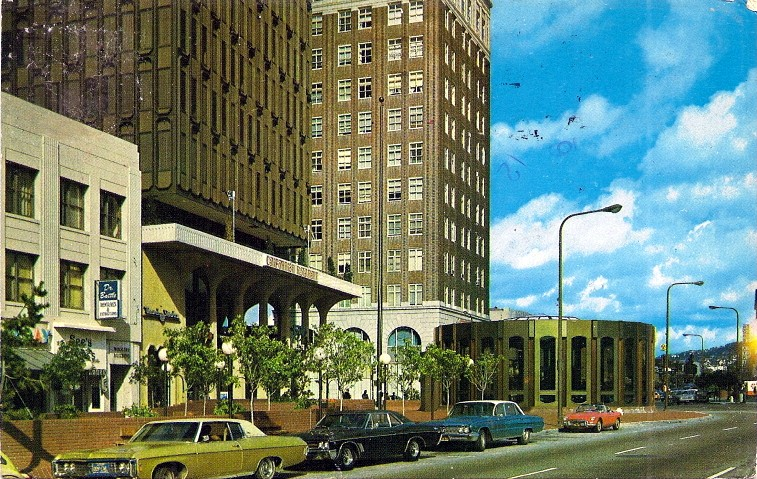
- A 1973 color photocrome postcard of the Downtown Berkeley BART station and Berkeley Chamber of Commerce building
- Interactive map of Shattuck Avenue
- Location: Berkeley and Oakland, California
- Nearest metro station: Downtown Berkeley
- Coordinates: 37.8721°N 122.2684°W
- South end: Telegraph Avenue in Oakland's Temescal District
- Major junctions: 51st Street west to SR 24 in Oakland; 55th Street east to SR 24 in Oakland; SR 13 / Ashby Avenue in Berkeley
- North end: Indian Rock Park in the Berkeley Hills

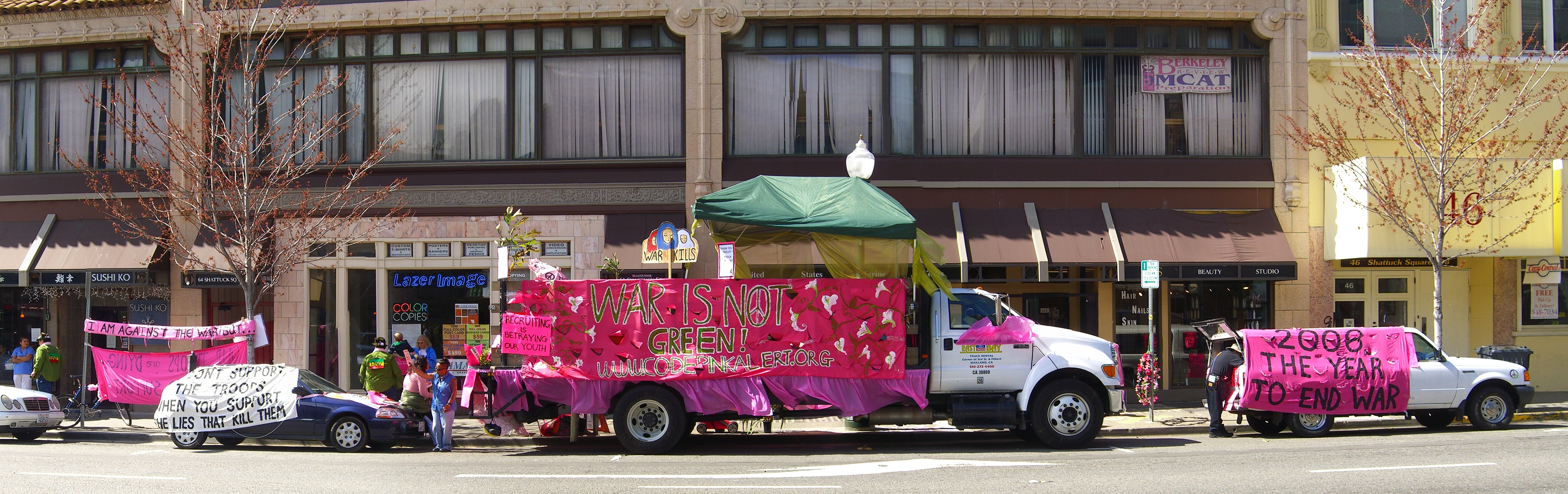
An anti-military recruitment protest along the street in downtown Berkeley

Shattuck Avenue is a major city street running north–south through Berkeley and Oakland, California. At its southern end, the street branches from Telegraph Avenue in Oakland's Temescal district, then ends at Indian Rock Park in the Berkeley Hills to the north. Shattuck Avenue is the main street of Berkeley, forming the spine of that city's downtown, and the site of the Gourmet Ghetto in North Berkeley. The street was named for Francis Kittredge Shattuck, an early landowner and booster who later served as Mayor of Oakland. Shattuck was largely responsible for the original construction of the road as well as for a railroad built along its route.

== History ==
During the Mexican era, a trail or road ran between the homes of the Peralta brothers, Domingo and Vicente. Domingo made his home along Codornices Creek near what is today the intersection of Sacramento and Hopkins Streets in Berkeley. Vicente's home was situated along Temescal Creek near what is today the intersection of 55th Street and Telegraph Avenue in North Oakland. The route of this early predecessor road, which came to be called the "Temescal Road", is depicted on the first official plat map of the area, Kellersberger's Map. A trace of it survives today as Racine Street in North Oakland.

During the 1850s, Francis Shattuck and three others laid claim to four adjoining strips of land in what is now downtown Berkeley. The dividing line between the parcels claimed by Shattuck and his brother-in-law George Blake became the alignment of a new county road whose construction the Board of Supervisors assigned to Francis Shattuck, a member of the board. The new road was laid out from where Strawberry Creek intersected the old Temescal Road, thence along the new alignment, extending southward to a gore point intersection with the Telegraph Road (today's Telegraph Avenue). The road became known as "Shattuck's Road". Francis Shattuck built his new home above the north bank of Strawberry Creek at the northern terminus of the county road, which was also the northern bound of Shattuck's claim, along the alignment of what is now Addison Street. The creek and Shattuck's home were situated along what is now Allston Way.

In 1866, the College Homestead Association, an organization established to raise funds for the new site of the College of California, filed a plat map with the object of selling parcels of land near the site of the present University of California. This map proposed names for several streets in a grid pattern, incorporating the alignment of Shattuck's Road, but designating it "Guyot Street". The name never stuck. By the time of the incorporation of the Town of Berkeley in 1878, Shattuck's Road had become Shattuck Avenue. By that time also, it had been extended northward to Rose Street. Additionally, the Central Pacific, at Shattuck's urging, had constructed its Berkeley Branch Railroad which merged into Shattuck at Adeline Avenue. In later years, this line was assigned to the Southern Pacific and eventually electrified and extended as the East Bay Electric Lines. Streetcars and transbay trains of the competing Key System also ran on Shattuck in Berkeley.

== Overview ==
In North Berkeley, Shattuck Avenue is the location of the Gourmet Ghetto, an unofficial district known for its density of restaurants. From there the street leads south to Downtown Berkeley.

Shattuck is an important north–south arterial roadway for northern Alameda County connecting the downtowns of Berkeley and Oakland. In the early 20th century the road included commuter train and streetcar tracks. Today BART carries commuters underground on the system's second-most-popular line, including the Ashby and Downtown Berkeley stations. Downtown Berkeley is one of BART's most frequented stations and a transit hub for AC Transit and Bear Transit buses.

Major employers and schools located along the street include the University of California, Berkeley City College, Berkeley High School, CALPIRG, the PowerBar headquarters and other office towers. The downtown length is home to many anchor and small retailers, in addition to being a bustling restaurant district.

The street is a major gathering place for protestors, as it is effectively the city's Main Street and connects with other major arterials including Ashby Avenue, University Avenue, and Telegraph Avenue. It was also the site of the Berkeley Marine Corps Recruiting Center protests and features a pink-colored curb reserved for protesting parking. Further south the street is the home to La Peña Cultural Center, the nation's Chilean American cultural capitol.

== See also ==
- F (AC Transit)
