= Downtown Berkeley, Berkeley, California =

Downtown Berkeley
- Neighborhood of Berkeley
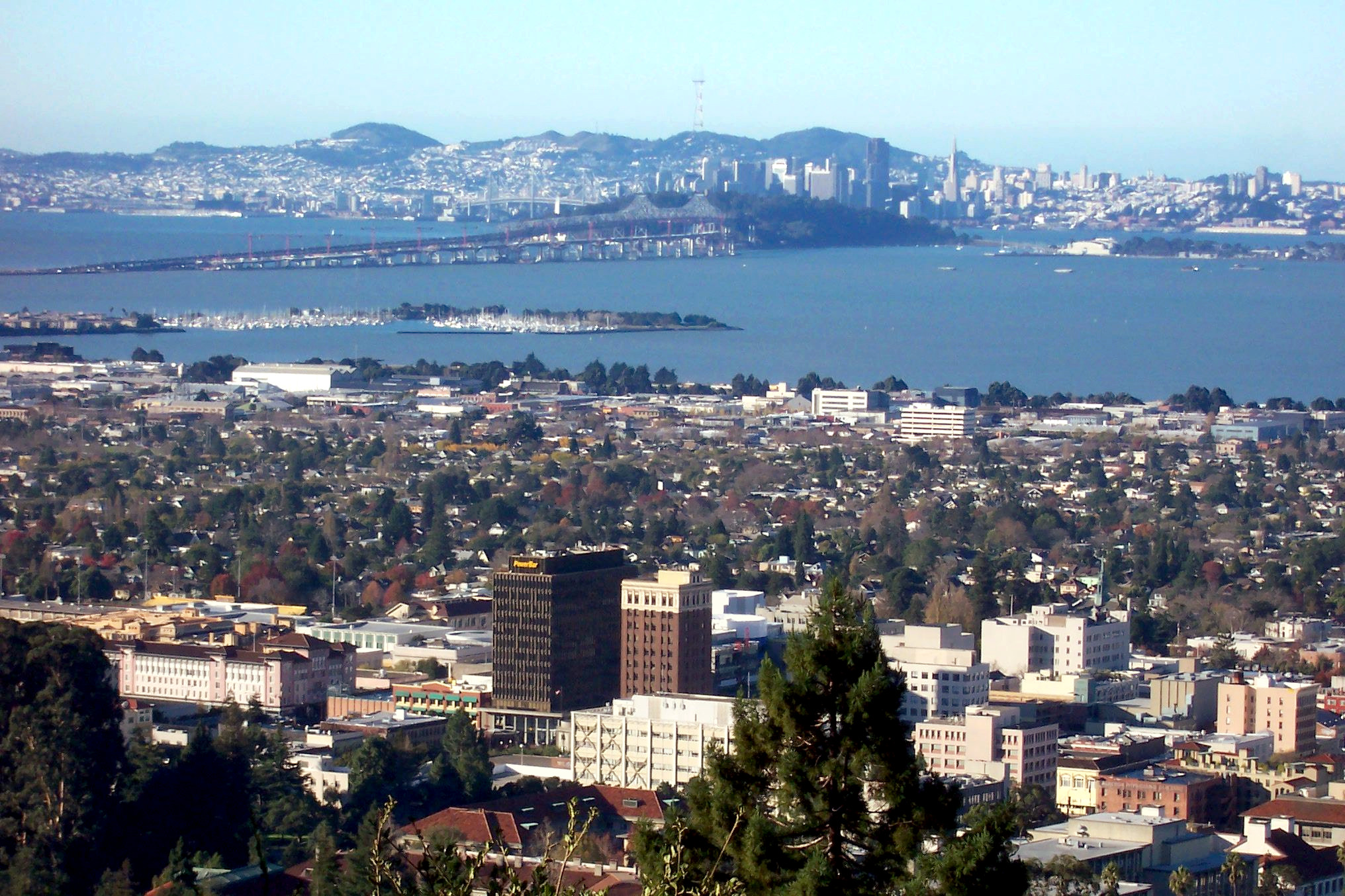
- Downtown Berkeley in the foreground, with San Francisco seen across the Bay

- Location within Berkeley and the East Bay
- Coordinates: 37.87°N 122.268°W
- Country: United States
- State: California
- County: Alameda
- City: Berkeley

Downtown Berkeley is the central business district of the city of Berkeley, California, United States, around the intersection of Shattuck Avenue and Center Street, and extending north to Hearst Avenue, south to Dwight Way, west to Martin Luther King Jr. Way, and east to Oxford Street. Downtown is the mass transit hub of Berkeley, with several AC Transit and UC Berkeley bus lines converging on the city's busiest BART station, as well as the location of Berkeley's civic center, high school, and Berkeley City College.

== History ==
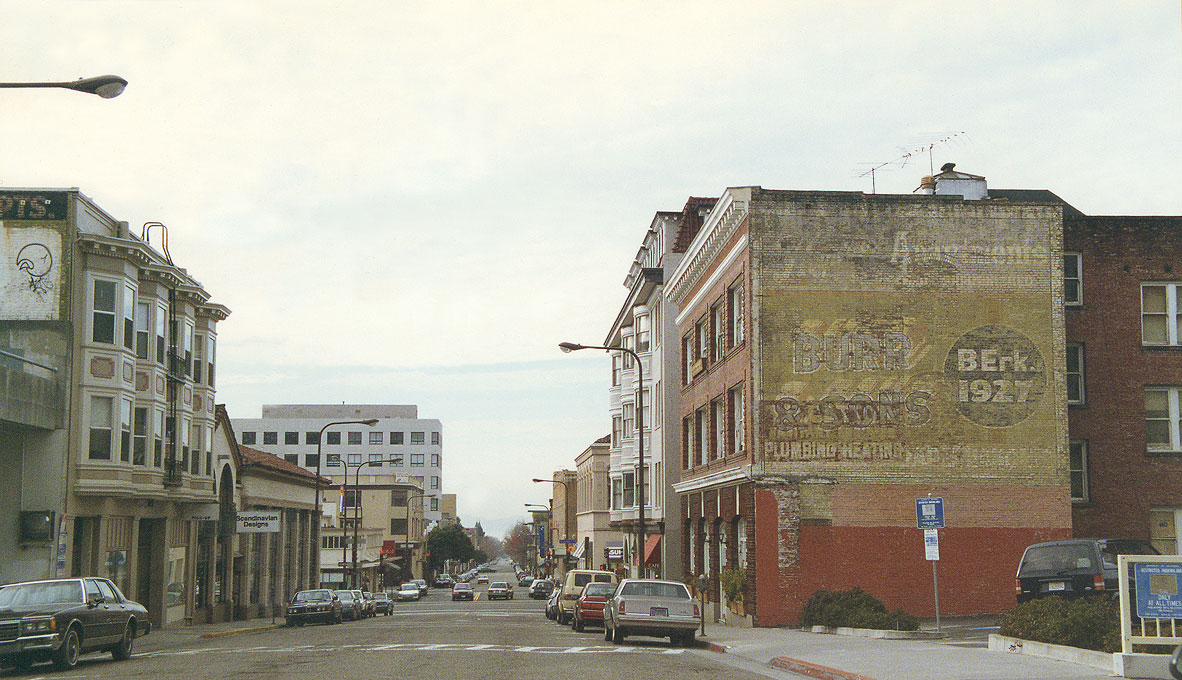
Addison Street, between Oxford Street and Shattuck Avenue, in 1994. The historic Studio Building is the second building on the right.

The area was formerly a settlement site of the Huichin/Chochen band of the Ohlone indigenous people. The site was probably associated with the proximity of Strawberry Creek which ran along what is today's Allston Way. During the days when the land was part of the vast Rancho San Antonio, a ford existed across Strawberry Creek beneath a clump of oak trees at approximately the intersection of Shattuck Avenue and Allston Way. The road or trail which crossed here connected the ranch houses of two of the Peralta brothers, Domingo and Vicente.

Following the Mexican–American War, four Americans laid claim to four equal strips of land in what is now downtown Berkeley, bounded on the north by what is today the alignment of Addison Street, and on the south, by Dwight Way. Among these claimants was Francis K. Shattuck. Shattuck's portion lay west of what is now Shattuck Avenue. He built a house here at the site of what is today the Hotel Shattuck Plaza. The county road going to Oakland along his property was informally called "Shattuck's road", but the planners of the College of California dubbed the street "Guyot" on their plat map. That name never caught on and the street name was upgraded to "Shattuck Avenue". In the 1890s, Strawberry Creek was culverted through the downtown section, the oak trees were removed, and Shattuck and University Avenues were improved. Nonetheless, the area developed slowly until about the time of the 1906 San Francisco earthquake, after which it developed rapidly.

The Central Pacific constructed its Berkeley Branch Railroad line connecting the area to the Oakland Pier and the transcontinental rail line in 1876, two years before the people living near the University of California and in Ocean View incorporated Berkeley. The end of the line at University Avenue was initially called the "Terminus" until the line was extended north, after which time it was called Berkeley Station. In the early years, downtown Berkeley was synonymous with "Berkeley Station", referring to the area around the railroad depot. The railroad served both passengers and freight at Berkeley Station. A telegraph office and Wells Fargo office were situated across the street from the depot.

The Key System opened up its electric train service to San Francisco from Downtown Berkeley in 1903. The Southern Pacific responded by electrifying and extending its lines in Berkeley in 1911 (East Bay Electric Lines) and moved its downtown freight operations just south of downtown to Ward Street and Shattuck. In 1941, however, SP ended its electric commuter train service. From then until April 1958, downtown Berkeley's commuter train service was solely in the hands of the Key System. Buses replaced the trains from 1958 to the present. In 1973, BART opened its own Berkeley station at Center Street and Shattuck, once again providing electric train service to San Francisco and elsewhere in the Bay Area.

For several years after the Key System's F train stopped running on Shattuck, its tracks (originally, the old SP tracks) remained in the pavement of Shattuck Avenue. Parking islands were created along the centerline of Shattuck overlapping the northbound tracks. In the early 1960s, a series of fountains were constructed which replaced some of these parking islands, extending from Center to Haste. The fountains quickly became the favorite targets of vandals who regularly put bubble bath in them. They were soon removed, just before Shattuck Avenue was torn up for the BART subway construction.

In early 2007 the Marine Recruiting Center for the northern Bay Area relocated from Alameda to downtown Berkeley in order to be closer to the University of California, Berkeley. This move was met with protests from Code Pink, prompted the city council to pass a 6-3 resolution calling the Marines "uninvited and unwelcome intruders", and led to United States Senator Jim DeMint attempting to pass legislation that would strip Berkeley of its $2,392,000 in federal funding.

== Commercial issues ==
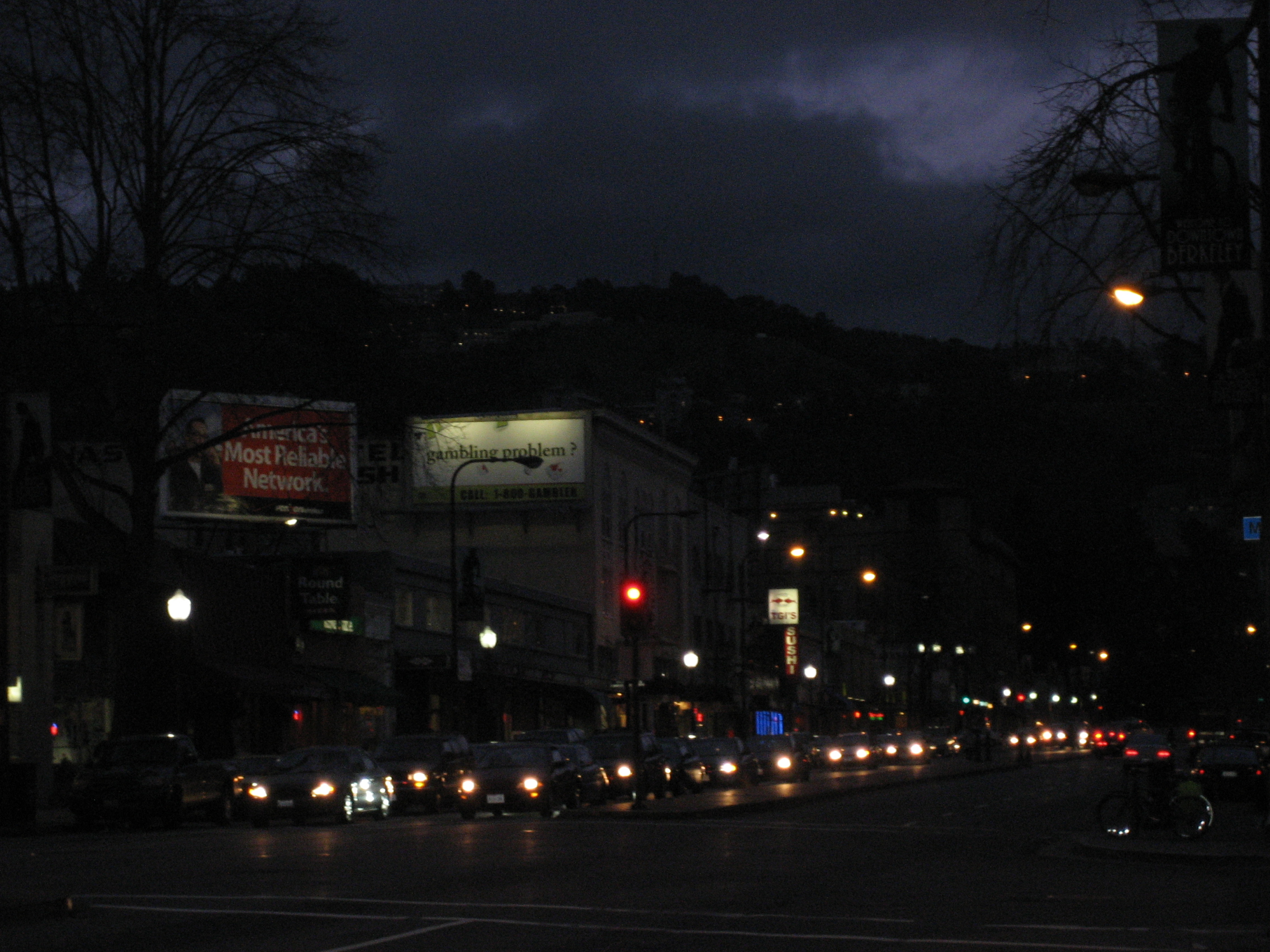
University Avenue at night.

Berkeley's downtown section has been the principal commercial center of Berkeley since the railroad station was built. However, it has had to compete with the secondary commercial sections which emerged starting as early as the 19th century. Three of these in the past were West Berkeley (Ocean View), North Berkeley (Berryman's) and the Telegraph area immediately south of the University of California campus. Others which came a bit later were the Elmwood area along College near Ashby, San Pablo Avenue, South Berkeley (formerly the Lorin District) and Thousand Oaks along Solano Avenue.

Starting in the 1970s it also had to compete with the emergence of major shopping centers and malls outside of Berkeley, especially El Cerrito Plaza, Hilltop Mall, and Emeryville. These resulted in the loss of several formerly prominent downtown businesses, including two large department stores; Hink's, whose building was converted to a movie theater and several smaller stores, and J. C. Penney. Contributing factors which continue to date are high commercial rents, a shortage of street parking and convenient garages, and higher consumer prices than those offered elsewhere. The latter has been a problem since the earliest days as there has always been a tendency to view the University population as a captive consumer base. The city has created an official arts district along Addison Street and passed laws restricting business hours in other neighborhoods in an attempt to increase night time activity downtown. To address the parking situation, the city is planning to install a system of digital signs to direct drivers to available parking spaces downtown.

As of 1903, Berkeley's downtown is highly eclectic, with numerous small businesses. Currently, the Berkeley City Council passed a new downtown area plan in an attempt to make the Downtown more sustainable and concentrate future development in the downtown area in conjunction with the announced plan of the University to build a hotel, conference center, and museum along Center Street. In 2009 local petition gatherers gained enough signatures to obstruct implementation of the plan, angering many residents of Berkeley, including the coalition of the Sierra Club, the Greenbelt Alliance, Berkeley Food & Housing Project and TransForm. The opponents argue that the new development calls for buildings that are too tall and have housing that is too expensive. Supporters of the downtown plan counter that the plan requires 20% affordable housing units and a denser downtown reduces carbon emissions.

In recent years, Shattuck Avenue has seen the opening of a number of new high-profile restaurants.

== Government ==
Downtown Berkeley is a part of Berkeley's District 4 and has been represented by Igor Tregub since June 2024. Tregub won his election by only 49 votes in a ranked-choice special election following the unexpected resignation of former D4 councilmember Kate Harrison. Downtown Berkeley is considered a left-leaning neighborhood in civic politics.
