= La Peña Cultural Center =

Multicultural center in Berkeley, California, US

Coordinates: 37.85515°N 122.26584°W

External image
- La Peña façade as seen from across Shattuck Avenue.

La Peña Cultural Center, or La Peña for short, is a multicultural center in Berkeley, California. It was founded in 1975 by Latin American and Californian allies in Berkeley, California in response to the 1973 coup d'état in Chile, or golpe de estado. The center was a focal point for the opposition-in-exile to dictator Augusto Pinochet during his rule, and later evolved into a nonprofit organization whose mission is to promote peace, social justice and community action through cultural arts, education and community action. La Peña is located at 3105 Shattuck Avenue in the Ashby neighborhood of South Berkeley, California.

== History ==
Founding members included: five Americans (Eric Leenson, Kevin Duncan, Craig McCaleb, Janis Teruggi, and Kay Cole), and three Chilean expatriates (Hugo Brenni, Patricia Brenni, and Juan Orson). Some of the founders were connected to Non-Intervention in Chile (NICH), a group was dedicated to supporting the Allende government and exposing the U.S. government's actions to undermine it. The center was a focal point for the opposition-in-exile to dictator Augusto Pinochet during his rule.

As a cultural center La Peña was founded with the belief that art and culture should play an activist role and that the center serves as a community gathering place, artist center, entertainment venue, and as a meeting place that aims to build community through artists and social activism.

Since its official founding in 1975, La Peña has become the home, hub and catalyst for dozens of Bay Area communities, offering classes and events rooted in distinct cultural traditions from the Americas and the Caribbean. Classes include: Puerto Rican Bomba y Plena, Afro-Peruvian cajon and dance, Capoeira Angola from Brazil, Son Jarocho jarana & zapateo from Mexico, Cuban Charanga and Salsa student ensembles, and more.

During the 1980s, La Peña became a gathering place for refugees from the violent political upheavals in Central America, and played a crucial role in the Central America solidarity movement.

=== Café ===
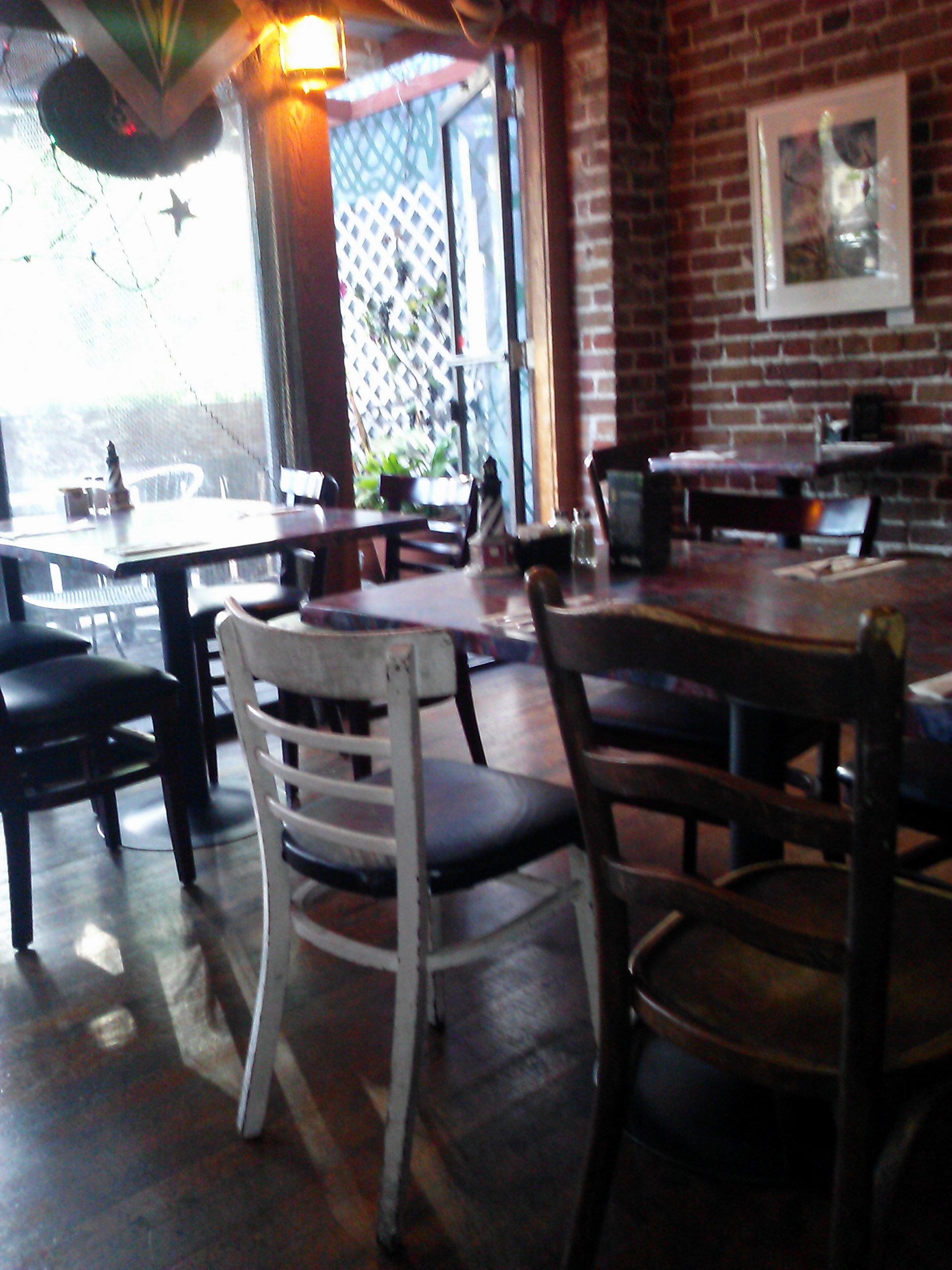
Café Valparaíso and its eclectic décor

The original restaurant was added in the year 1976, and was later known as Café Valparaíso. It became part of the neighborhood's Gourmet Ghetto and is award-winning. It is also known as Café de la Peña. The cafe also sells endemic Chilean foodstuffs and novelties. Valpo's menu focuses heavily on Chilean empanadas. The menu evolved over the years adding other Latin American cuisine such as food from Cuba, Mexico, Guatemala, and Peru. The menu does however continue serving many Chilean dishes such as humitas. In the mid 2010s the cafe left La Peña and relocated to Solano Avenue in nearby Albany folding in 2018 due to "personal reasons".

=== Music ===
In 2005 the center was noted for its involvement in and being a center of several forms of art forms that descended from African slaves in Cuba, Puerto Rico, and the Caribbean. These were lessons in and performances of two dances. These dances are the percussion driven plena and bomba. The peña also has its own music groups: La Peña Chorus and Lab Hip Hop Ensemble. It has also been noted for its Little Friends of La Peña concert series of bilingual children's musical offerings.

== Community ==
The center is an annual gathering place for the Chilean diaspora, with meetings and celebrations for Chilean independence's fiestas patrias, Christmas, and the anniversary of the 1973 Chilean coup d'état.

La Peña is a registered 501(c)3 charity with tax exempt status that focuses on promoting the arts, and the building's façade is covered in a Nueva Canción inspired mural. The center teaches lessons on traditional Chilean music, art, etc. and also branches out into other Latin American and Spanish language fields with a focus on things South American. The space is also used as a fund-raising venue for local causes such as supporting the KPFA radio station and relief efforts in Puerto Rico following Hurricane Maria.

=== Charity ===
In 2010 La Peña hosted the Mano a Mano (Hand in Hand) benefit for the victims of the 2010 Chile earthquake that hoped to generate $US10,000 in donations.
