= Cheeseboard =

Cheeseboard may refer to:

- A cheese course of a meal
- Trencher (tableware)

== See also ==
- Cheese Board Collective
