= Peralta Home =

Historic house in California, United States

- Peralta House
- U.S. National Register of Historic Places
- California Historical Landmark
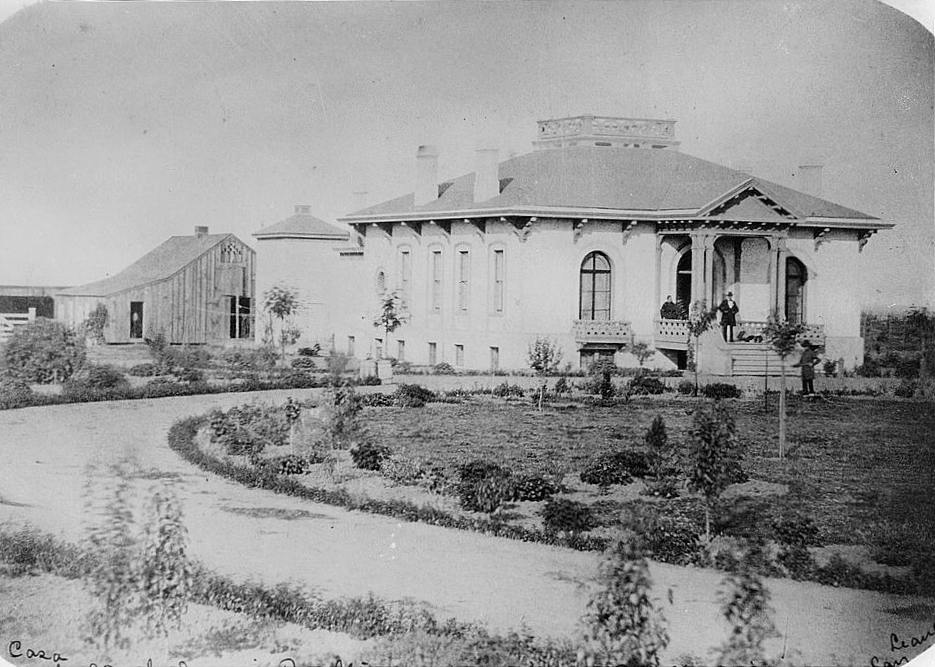
- Peralta Home at time of construction, 1860
- Location: 561 Lafayette Ave., San Leandro, California, US
- Coordinates: 37°43′50.64″N 122°9′41.4″W
- Built: 1860
- Architect: William P. Toler
- Architectural style: Spanish Colonial
- NRHP reference No.: 78000654
- CHISL No.: 285

Significant dates
- Added to NRHP: November 22, 1978
- Designated CHISL: 1938

The Peralta Home at 561 Lafayette Avenue in San Leandro, California, was the first brick house built in 1860 in Alameda County. It is also known as the Alta Mira Club House, and Casa Peralta. The house is a California Historical Landmark (No. 285), and is listed on the National Register of Historic Places (NPS-78000654) as "Peralta House".

== History ==
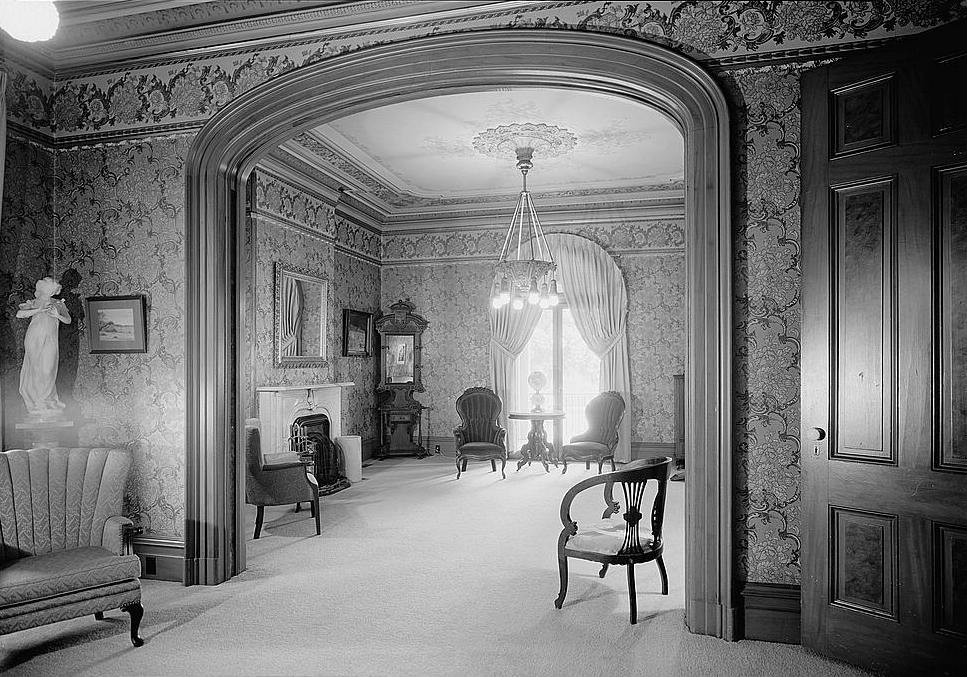
Interior of the Peralta Home, 1960

The Peralta Home was constructed in the Spanish Colonial style in 1860 for Ignacio Peralta, early San Leandro Spanish settler, by William P. Toler (or W.P. Toller, Peralta's son-in-law). One of the more interesting of 19th-century houses in San Leandro, it has additional historic associations with the large and land-rich Peralta family, who were pioneers of the area. Peralta's father, Luís María Peralta, received the Rancho San Antonio land grant from Spanish Governor Don Pablo Vicente de Solá on October 20, 1820.

A.C. Peachey purchased the house from Rafaela Sanchez Peralta (Ignacio's widow) on May 18, 1875. Immediately thereafter Peachey added a large wood extension at the back of the brick house. Technically a 2 1/2-story building, the old Peralta house had its main reception rooms on the second story. Peachey continued this emphasis on the second story in his additions, treating the ground floor as a basement.

The house remained in the Peachey family for thirty-four years. Between 1909 and 1926, it went to Daniel and C.L. Best. Eventually in November 1926, it was purchased by the Alta Mira Club, who are still the current owners.
