= Nick Cho =

American barista and TikToker

Nicholas Cho
- Cho in 2026
- Born: 1973 (age 52–53); Seoul, South Korea
- Occupations: Barista; Internet personality
- Website: yourkoreandad.com

Nicholas Cho, also known by his online alias Your Korean Dad, (born 1973) is an American barista, businessman, and internet personality.

== Coffee career ==
In 2002, Cho opened his first coffee shop, Murky Coffee, in Washington, D.C. It is one of the earliest cafes to be associated with the third wave of coffee and had an expected 2005 sales of over US$1,000,000. They purchased their beans from Counter Culture Coffee. A second location opened in Arlington County, Virginia, in 2004. Murky Coffee closed in May 2009. Cho pleaded guilty to tax-fraud in February 2010 for failing to pay sales tax and failing to file unincorporated franchise taxes for Murky Coffee. In his plea, he agreed to five-year probation, community service, and a repayment plan.

Cho is a barista competition judge. He organized the mid-Atlantic region's first barista competition in Washington in February 2006 and chaired the United States Barista Championship.

Cho cofounded Wrecking Ball Coffee Roasters with Trish Rothgeb in Washington, D.C. In September 2014, they opened a location on Union Street in Cow Hollow, San Francisco. They expanded into the Gourmet Ghetto, Berkeley, California in August 2019 at the old Philz Coffee location. Cho, Rothgeb, and chef Alice Waters expressed their opposition to the use of the word "ghetto" in describing the neighborhood. The North Shattuck Association voted to remove the name from signs and marketing material in September 2019.

Cho hosted the Portafilter coffee podcast.

== Your Korean Dad ==
After quitting Facebook, Cho's two teenage daughters encouraged him to post on TikTok. He joined the platform in 2019 and posted his first video in April 2020. The "Your Korean Dad" TikTok account reached 1 million followers in November 2020 and 2 million followers in January 2021. His videos feature him pretending to be your dad. A typical video begins with Cho introducing himself with, "I'm your Korean dad." And then it follows Cho as he engages in mundane tasks, such as shopping at Walgreens or making coffee.

Cho portrayed the character in an Alaska Airlines ad in 2022.

Cho said that his Korean dad persona is different from his father.

== Personal life ==
Cho was born in Seoul, South Korea, in 1973. He immigrated to the United States as a toddler.

He has two daughters. Cho was married to his business partner and fellow barista Trish Rothgeb. He announced his divorce from Rothgeb in February 2022.
