= Elmwood, Berkeley, California =

Neighborhood in Berkeley, California, USA

Coordinates: 37°51′25″N 122°15′11″W

The Elmwood District is a neighborhood of the city of Berkeley, California.

== History ==
Elmwood was originally an area of large rural estates that was subdivided into several tracts during the housing boom following the 1906 San Francisco earthquake. Developed as a streetcar suburb located in open land away from the central city, Elmwood was eventually integrated into the East Bay metropolis by decades of urban expansion and infill development.

Elmwood was the first Berkeley subdivision, and one of the first neighborhoods in the United States, to be assigned single-family residential zoning. Real estate developer Duncan McDuffie and other developers of the early 20th century sought to limit the types of housing that could be built there in an effort to price out social groups thought to be less desirable, specifically a Black dance hall and a Chinese laundry.

Elmwood was developed as a de facto segregated neighborhood, reinforced by Federal Housing Administration–guaranteed mortgages, which were not issued to African Americans. Homes purchased with FHA-guaranteed mortgages were closely scrutinized to ensure segregation was maintained. In one noted 1958 incident, a White San Francisco schoolteacher, Gerald Cohn, purchased a house with an FHA-guaranteed mortgage in Elmwood. By the closing date, Cohn was not ready to inhabit the property; while continuing to pay the mortgage, Cohn rented the house to a fellow teacher, Alfred Simmons, who was African American. The Berkeley Police Department asked the Federal Bureau of Investigation to investigate Simmons moving in to an all-White neighborhood. Cohn was not prosecuted, but the FHA blacklisted Cohn and prevented him from ever obtaining another government-backed mortgage. Such policies ensured the ongoing segregation of the Elmwood district. As of the 2010 census, census tracts 4237 and 4238, which encompass the Elmwood district, have the highest percentage White residents of any Alameda County census tract, hovering at 63% and 77% respectively.

== Geography ==
Elmwood is a primarily residential neighborhood. The original 1905 Elmwood Park tract was bounded by Claremont and College Avenues and Prince and Russell Streets. Both Elmwood Park and the surrounding area are often referred to simply as Elmwood. Other named subdivisions include Claremont, Berry Bangs, University Villa, Bateman, Parkside, and Homeview. The most extreme definitions of the district's boundaries do not extend past Telegraph Avenue to the west, Dwight Way to the north, or the Oakland city limit to the south.

The neighborhood has a small commercial corridor centered on the intersection of Ashby and College Avenues, spanning College Avenue about one to two blocks in each direction. The commercial area consists of small shops and restaurants that cater to local residents. There is also a small movie theater and a bank near the intersection. There are also a handful of businesses near the intersection of College Avenue and Derby Street.

== Architecture ==
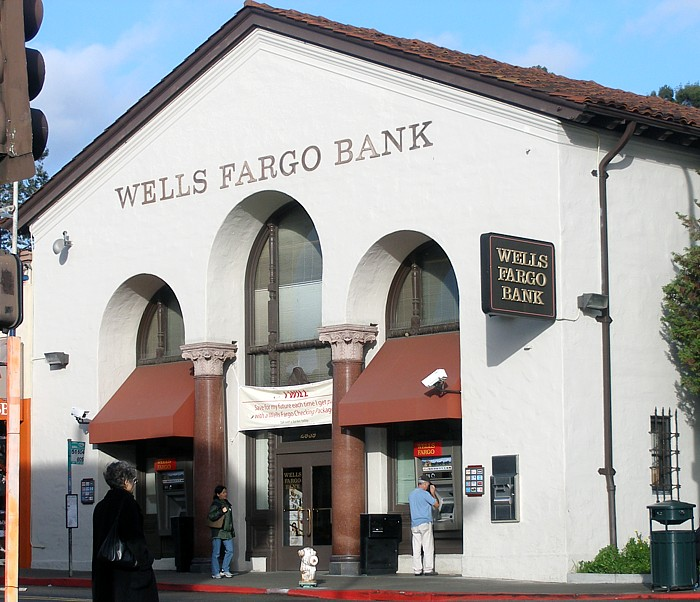
Bank branch at the intersection of College Avenue and Ashby Avenue

The housing stock in Elmwood is similar to surrounding areas of Berkeley and consists mostly of detached houses and small apartment buildings. The houses are generally moderate to large Brown Shingle, Arts and Crafts and Colonial Revival homes, sometimes one or two stories, that are usually landscaped with gardens and generally well-kept. The apartment buildings tend to be newer, usually built between the 1950s and 1970s, and become more numerous towards the adjacent Southside neighborhood.

== Institutions ==
Alta Bates Hospital is located in Elmwood near Ashby and Telegraph Avenues. Maybeck High School, Willard Middle School, the Julia Morgan Center for the Arts, the Claremont Branch of the Berkeley Public Library, and Willard Park are also located within a few blocks of the center of the neighborhood.

== See also ==
- Redlining
