= Nina LaCour =

American author

Nina LaCour is an American author, primarily known for writing young adult literature with LGBTQ romance storylines. Her novel We Are Okay won the Michael L. Printz Award in 2018.

== Early life and education ==
LaCour was born in 1983 and raised in the San Francisco Bay Area. She attended Campolindo High School and graduated in 2000. She received her bachelor's degree from San Francisco State University and a Master of Fine Arts in creative writing from Mills College.

== Career ==
LaCour's first novel, Hold Still, was the result of her master's thesis while at Mills College. Also while there, LaCour began teaching English composition to undergraduate students. Following graduation, she taught at Berkeley City College and Maybeck High School before taking a few years off to care for her daughter.

LaCour has also taught in the Master of Fine Arts in Creative Writing for Children and Young Adults program at Hamline University.

== Personal life ==
LaCour lives in San Francisco with her wife and daughter.

== Selected works ==
=== Hold Still (2009) ===
Hold Still is a young adult novel published October 20, 2009, by Dutton Children's Books.

The book received the following accolades:

- American Library Association's Best Fiction for Young Adults selection (2010)
- William C. Morris Award finalist (2010)

=== Everything Leads to You (2014) ===
Everything Leads to You is a young adult novel published May 15, 2014, by Dutton Children's Books.

The book is a Junior Library Guild selection and has received the following accolades:

- Goodreads Choice Award for Young Adult Fiction nominee (2014)
- American Library Association's Best Fiction for Young Adults selection (2015)
- ALA Rainbow Book List selection (2015)

=== We Are Okay (2017) ===
We Are Okay is a young adult novel published February 14, 2017, by Dutton Children's Books.

TIME added the book to its "100 Best Young Adult Books of All Time" list, and Bustle named it one of the best books of the decade. The Boston Globe, Publishers Weekly, and Seventeen named it one of the best books of the year.

We Are Okay received various accolades, including the following:

- Booklist Editors' Choice: Books for Youth 2017 selection (2018)
- Michael L. Printz Award winner (2018)
- American Library Association's Rainbow Book List Top Ten selection (2018)

=== Watch Over Me (2020) ===
Watch Over Me is a young adult novel published September 15, 2020, by Dutton Children's Books.

The New York Public Library, Chicago Public Library, BuzzFeed, and Kirkus Reviews named it one of the best young adult books of the year.

The book received various accolades, including the following:

- YALSA's Amazing Audiobooks for Young Adults selection (2021)
- American Library Association's Best Fiction for Young Adults selection (2021)

=== Yerba Buena (2022) ===
Yerba Buena is LaCour's first book of adult fiction. The novel is the story of "two star-crossed young women navigating trauma, family, and romance" and has "themes of drug and sexual abuse, death, abandonment, and purposelessness". The New York Times called it a "sensory feast".

=== The Apartment House on Poppy Hill (2023) ===
LaCour's 2023 book The Apartment House on Poppy Hill, illustrated by Sonia Albert, was shortlisted for the 2024 Lambda Literary Award for Children's Literature.

== Publications ==
- Hold Still (2009)
- The Disenchantments (2012)
- Everything Leads to You (2014)
- You Know Me Well, with David Levithan (2016)
- We Are Okay (2017)
- Watch Over Me (2020)
- Yerba Buena (2022)
- Meet Me In the Garden (2026)
