= Maybeck High School =

Coordinates: 37°51′39.18″N 122°15′9.82″W

Location
- 2727 College Ave; Berkeley, California 94705; United States

Information
- Type: Private
- Motto: "Open doors, open minds"
- Established: 1972
- School Director: Beth Pillsbury
- Grades: 9–12
- Enrollment: 114 (2023-24)
- Student to teacher ratio: 8:1
- Campus: urban
- Mascot: Pineapple
- Website: www.maybeckhs.org

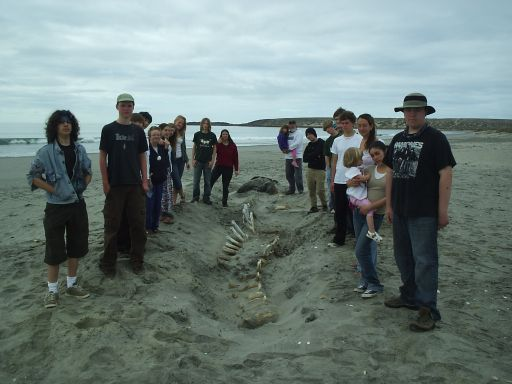
Baja Special Program, 2006

Maybeck High School is located at St. John's Presbyterian Church in Berkeley.

Maybeck High School is a coeducational, independent, college preparatory high school located in Berkeley, California. It was founded in 1972 and is housed at St. John's Presybyterian Church.

== History ==
Maybeck High School was established in 1972 by four teachers who had been let go from St. Elizabeth High School in Oakland for opposing streaming and advocating for a looser dress code, Paul August, Sam Cardinet, Jim Kelly, and Jack Radisch. Cardinet, the history teacher, was its founding director. It was named after the regional architect Bernard Maybeck. The school began with 17 students; classes were initially taught in empty classrooms on Dwinelle Hall at the University of California, in the open air at state parks, and in a schoolbus, then in rented spaces at churches, until the school found a long-term home at Trinity United Methodist Church in Southside. The 1973 first graduating class of three all won scholarships to either the University of California or Stanford University. By 2022, Maybeck had moved to St. John's Presbyterian Church.

== Curriculum ==
Maybeck was founded as a college preparatory school; a proposed merger with Discovery House, a closing high school in Richmond, failed because its students regarded Maybeck as too academic. The school aims to challenge students academically within a flexible curriculum, encourages risk-taking, and attracts "bright, quirky kids". Volunteer work is required for graduation, as of 2006, 60 hours. In honor of Bernard Maybeck, exploration and appreciation of nature are encouraged and each graduating student receives a sapling to plant.

For two weeks before spring break, the school suspends regular classes and conducts Special Programs, in which students divide into small groups led by staff members, each pursuing its own activity. Programs vary from year to year and can be local, regional, or international; in 2004, a group of 16 Maybeck students arrived in Spain two weeks after the Madrid train bombings.

== Notable people ==
- Ala Ebtekar, student
- Alta, teacher
- Moshe Kasher, student
- Nina LaCour, teacher
- Dean Linnard, student
