= We Are Okay =

2017 young adult novel by Nina LaCour

- Author: Nina LaCour
- Language: English
- Publisher: Dutton Books for Young Readers
- Publication date: February 14, 2017
- Media type: Print
- Pages: 236
- ISBN: 9780525425892

We Are Okay is a young adult novel by Nina LaCour, published February 14, 2017 by Dutton Books for Young Readers.

== Reception ==
We Are Okay received starred reviews from Booklist, Kirkus, Publishers Weekly, Shelf Awareness, and School Library Journal, as well as a positive review from Horn Book Guide.

Kirkus called the book "An elegantly crafted paean to the cleansing power of truth," and Booklist called it "[r]aw and beautiful." The Washington Post named it one of nine influential young adult novels over the past 50 years, placing it alongside Harry Potter, The Outsiders, and The Hunger Games.

TIME added the book to its "100 Best Young Adult Books of All Time" list, and Bustle named it one of the best books of the decade. The Boston Globe,Publishers Weekly, and Seventeen named it one of the best books of the year.

The audiobook, narrated by Jorjeana Marie, received a starred review from School Library Journal, who stated that Marie "conveys the depth of Marin's moodiness, introspection, and confusion... [A]s Marin grows stronger, so does Marie's voice for her." Booklist also provided a positive review, noting that "Marie’s heartfelt reading enlivens the story and wrings meaning out of each word."

Accolades for We Are Okay
Year	Accolade	Result	Ref.
2017	Booklist Editors' Choice: Books for Youth	Top 10	
2017	Boston Globe's Best Children's and YA Books of the Year	Selection	
2017	Goodreads Choice Award for Young Adult Fiction	Nominee	
2017	New York Public Library Best Books for Teens	Selection	
2017	Publishers Weekly's Best Young Adult Books of the Year	Selection	
2017	Seventeen's Best Young Adult Books of the Year	Selection	
2017	TIME 100 Best Young Adult Books of All Time	Selection	
2018	Bustle Best Book of the Decade	Selection	
2018	Capitol Choices, Ages Fourteen and Up	Selection	
2018	Michael L. Printz Award	Winner	
2018	ALA Rainbow List	Top 10	
2019	Rhode Island Teen Book Award	Nominee	
2019	Lincoln Award	Nominee	
