= Kellersberger's Map =

1854 map of San Francisco Bay

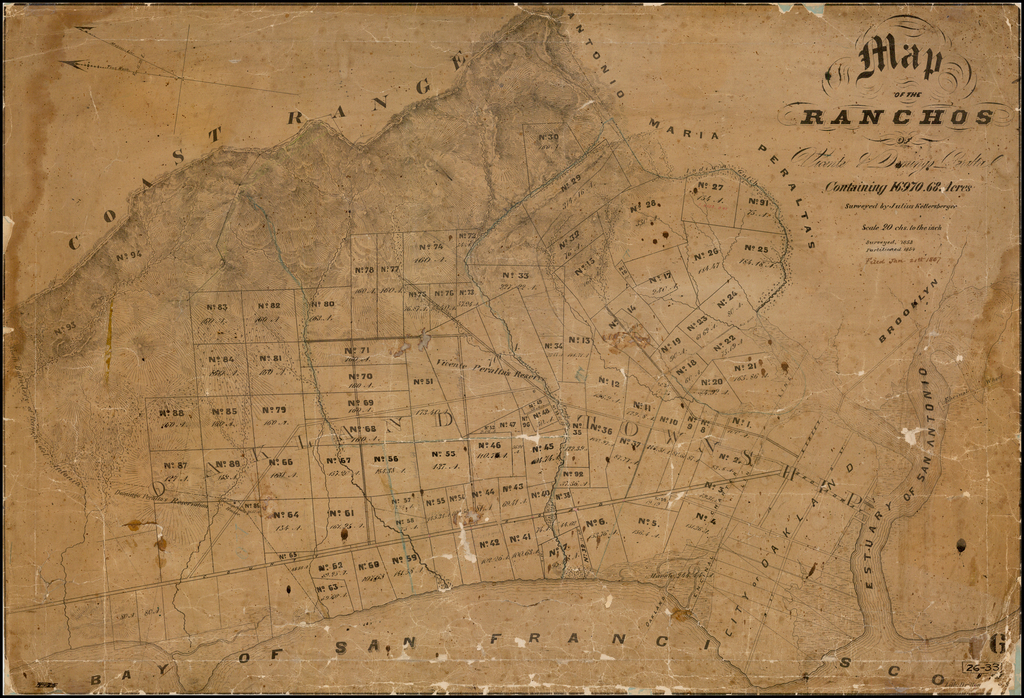

Kellersberger's Map is a plat map created in 1854 of Rancho San Antonio on the northeastern shore lands, the Contra Costa of San Francisco Bay, in present day Alameda County, California. The area surveyed today comprises the entire extent of the cities of Berkeley and Albany, and the northern part of Oakland, including its downtown and waterfront.

The map can be seen here: 1854 Map of the Vicente & Domingo Peralta Ranchos, Lithographed by Britton & Rey, courtesy of Barry Lawrence Ruderman Antique Maps Inc.

Kellersberger's Map was created by surveyor Julius Kellersberger (1821-1900) in order to facilitate the subdivision of a portion of the Mexican land grant lands of the Alta California era Rancho San Antonio following the Mexican–American War and U.S. statehood.

Kellersberger had previously surveyed a map of the original claimed extent of the city of Oakland.

== List of plots ==
The following is a partial list of the subdivision plots on Kellersberger's Map together with the names of their original claimants:

- 57 – Peter Mathews (Ireland), 53.75 acres (217,500 m^{2})
- 58 – Peter Mathews, 75 acres (300,000 m^{2})
- 60 – Jean Noel, 107.63 acres (0.4356 km^{2})
- 62 – Juan Ysunza (Chile), 89.25 acres (361,200 m^{2})
- 63 – Rosario Sisterna (Chile), 59.60 acres (241,200 m^{2})
- 64 – Michael Curtis (Ireland), 154 acres (0.62 km^{2})
- 65 – Francois Pioche (France via Chile), 48.88 acres (197,800 m^{2})
- 67 – Francois Pioche, 157.20 acres (0.6362 km^{2})
- 68 – Francis K. Shattuck, 160 acres (0.65 km^{2})
- 69 – George M. Blake, 160 acres (0.65 km^{2})
- 70 – James Leonard (Ireland), 160 acres (0.65 km^{2})
- 71 – William Hillegass, 160 acres (0.65 km^{2})
- 78 – Joseph Irving, 160 acres (0.65 km^{2})
- 89 – Jacob Irving, 155 acres (0.63 km^{2})
- City of Oakland, acreage unspecified
- Vicente Peralta Reserve, 7,001 acres (28.33 km^{2})
- Domingo Peralta Reserve, acreage unspecified

== See also ==
- Ranchos of California
- List of Ranchos of California
