= Cragmont, Berkeley, California =

Cragmont
- Neighborhood of Berkeley
- Location within Berkeley and the East Bay
- Coordinates: 37.895278°N 122.265°W
- Country: United States
- State: California
- County: Alameda
- City: Berkeley

The Cragmont area of Berkeley is a residential district located in the northeastern section of the city, occupying most of the hill area north of Codornices Creek. It lies at an elevation of 755 feet (230 m).

The Cragmont area was mostly grassland with oak and bay laurel trees in the canyons until the beginnings of the American era. The area was named for the various rock outcroppings which occur throughout the district. It was first developed as grazing land in the late 19th century. When a one-mile (1.6 km) exclusion zone for the sale of liquor was imposed with respect to the campus of the University of California, a local farmer opened up a saloon at what is now the corner of Spruce Street and Marin Avenue. Today, there are no commercial areas in the district.

In the early 20th century, a streetcar line operated by the Key System was opened up along Euclid Avenue to Hilgard Street near the University campus. It was soon extended up Euclid as far as Regal Road, one block south of Marin Avenue. The area was immediately put up for sale for residential development.

Many homes in the Cragmont area command an outstanding view of San Francisco Bay and the Golden Gate. On the other hand, houses are closely spaced and there are many trees, posing a very high fire hazard during episodes of warm, dry and windy weather. There are also a number of active slides, and the Hayward Fault, a major branch of the San Andreas Fault, cuts right through the district, roughly along the alignment of (from south to north) La Loma-Euclid-Spruce streets.
