= Arizmendi Bakery =

Bakery chain in California, United States

- Type: Worker cooperative
- Industry: Bakery
- Predecessor: Cheese Board Collective
- Founded: 1997; 29 years ago
- Area served: San Francisco Bay Area
- Website: www.arizmendibakery.coop

Arizmendi Bakery is a network of independent bakeries located in the San Francisco Bay Area of California in the United States, including locations in San Francisco, Berkeley, Emeryville, and Oakland. They are all worker cooperatives which are independently operated but share similar products and recipes.

Arizmendi Bakery were inspired by and supported by the Cheese Board Collective, with the first location, on Lakeshore Avenue in Oakland, opening in 1997. It was named after Basque priest and labor organizer José María Arizmendiarrieta.

In 2011, Arizmendi was voted the best bakery in the East Bay by the East Bay Express. Food reviewer Tamara Palmer, from SF Weekly, called their Auntie Mabel's Kookie Brittle the best cookie in San Francisco.

== Menu and offerings ==
Arizmendi's primary offerings includes pastries, pizza, and bread. The bakery makes pastries, pizza, bread, and other items such as fruitcakes. The bakery menu features rotating seasonal items such as panettone, hot cross buns, and pies.

== Gallery ==
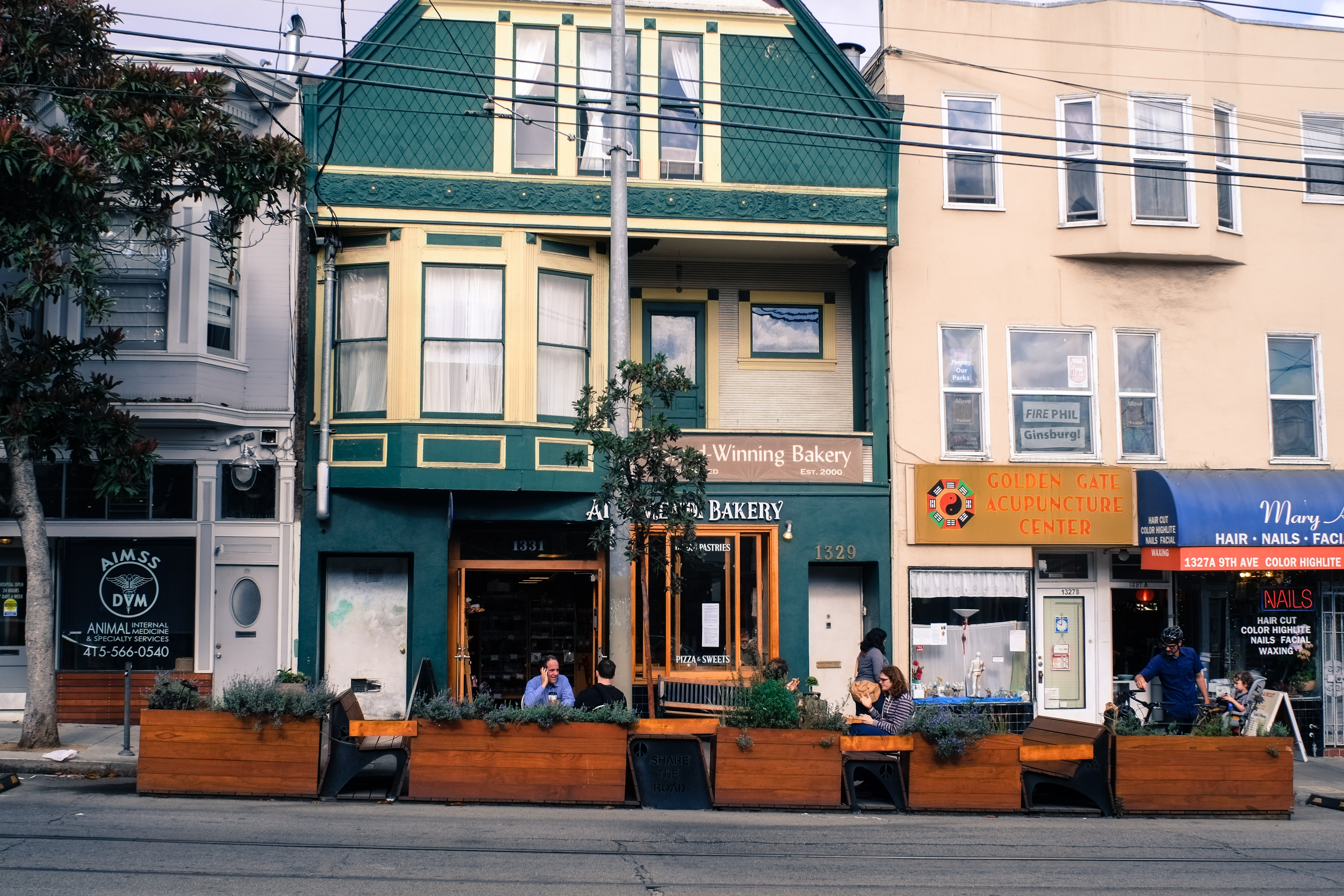
Arizmendi Bakery in San Francisco

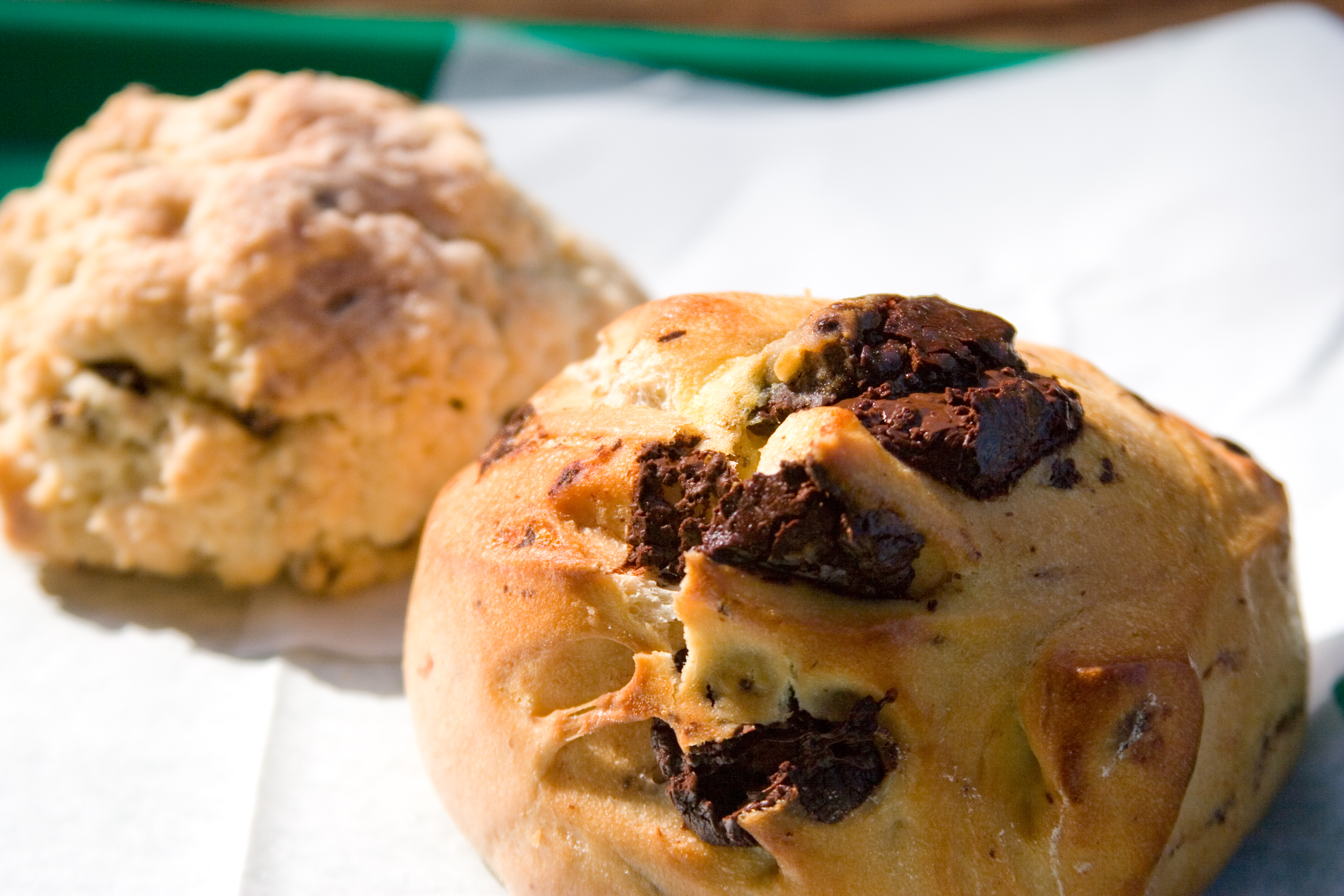
Pastries from Arizmendi Bakery
