= Everything Leads to You =

2014 novel by Nina LaCour

- Author: Nina LaCour
- Language: English
- Publisher: Dutton Books for Young Readers
- Publication date: May 15, 2014
- Media type: Print
- ISBN: 9780525425885

Everything Leads to You is a young adult novel by Nina LaCour, published May 15, 2014 by Dutton Books for Young Readers.

== Reception ==
Everything Leads to You received a starred review from Publishers Weekly, as well as positive reviews from Los Angeles Times, Kirkus, School Library Journal, The Bulletin of the Center for Children's Books, Booklist, VOYA, and The Horn Book Guide. The book is a Junior Library Guild selection.

Multiple reviewers applauded LaCour for setting the novel in Los Angeles without writing only about the glamour of the city, providing a "more realistic depiction of the gap between the city’s rich and poor." Publishers Weekly noted the way LaCour portrays "real pain, longing, and feeling," while Kirkus highlighted that the "sensitive, multifaceted novel creates an authentic portrayal of the ups and downs of life."

The Los Angeles Times applauded LaCour's ability to capture "the unique intensity of teenage characters discovering love, sex and intense friendship for the first time."

Accolades for Everything Leads to You
| Year | Accolade | Result | Ref. |
|---|---|---|---|
| 2015 | YALSA's Best Fiction for Young Adults | Selection | |
| 2015 | ALA Rainbow List | Selection | |
| 2015 | TAYSHAS Reading List | Selection | |
| 2014 | Goodreads Choice Award for Young Adult Fiction | Nominee | |
