= Hold Still =

2009 young adult novel by Nina LaCour

- Author: Nina LaCour
- Language: English
- Subject: Mental health, Photography, Suicide
- Publisher: Dutton Children's Books
- Publication date: October 20, 2009
- Media type: Print
- Pages: 230
- ISBN: 9780525421559

Hold Still is a young adult novel by Nina LaCour, published October 20, 2009, by Dutton Children's Books.

== Backstory ==
Hold Still was written to complete LaCour's requirements of her master of fine arts degree from Mills College.

LaCour has stated that she pulled inspiration from the book from her personal life, noting that when she was in ninth grade, two people she knew killed themselves, a teacher and a classmate. LaCour's decision to add photography into the novel stemmed from a photograph she found, taken by one of her mother's high-school-aged students. The photo focused on "a girl's bare stomach with the words 'fat, ugly, stupid' carved into the skin." The girl in the photo served as the inspiration for Ingrid, whereas the person who took the photo became the inspiration for Caitlin.

== Reception ==
Hold Still received a starred review from Publishers Weekly, as well as positive reviews from Kirkus and The Horn Book. The book is a Junior Library Guild selection.

Publishers Weekly called the novel "an impressive debut with an emotionally charged young adult novel about friendship and loss."

The Horn Book called it "a fresh take on a well-worn subject and a passionate argument for creativity as a vehicle for healing." The Junior Library Guild echoed the sentiment, stating, "The book is invested in the creative process and shows that there are multiple steps involved in moving from inspiration to finished art."

The Junior Library Guild further noted that LaCour's "[c]haracters are detailed and feel refreshingly contemporary," providing a "[c]ompelling depiction of friendship."

Booklist provided a mixed review, stating that "this first novel may try to cover too much," while noting that the "immediate, present-tense, first-person narrative stays true to a teen’s daily experience, and ... the metaphors of loss and recovery are rooted in the surprising dramas of daily life."

In 2023, the book was banned, in Clay County District Schools, Florida. and Penncrest School District, Pennsylvania.

Accolades for Hold Still
Year	Accolade	Result	Ref.
2009	Publishers Weekly Flying Start	Selection	
2010	American Library Association's Best Books for Young Adults	Selection	
2010	William C. Morris YA Debut Award	Finalist	
2011	Rhode Island Teen Book Award	Nominee	
2011	TAYSHAS Reading List	Selection	
