= Ignacio Peralta =

Hermenegildo Ignacio Peralta (April 3, 1791 – May 9, 1874) was a Spanish settler in California, the eldest son of Luís María Peralta.

== Early life ==
Ignacio Peralta was the owner of the Peralta Home in San Leandro, California, which was built on the southerly portion of Rancho San Antonio, the land grant his father received from Governor Pablo Vicente de Solá in 1820.

== Career ==
Initially, he and his wife lived in a simple adobe house on the property, constructed in 1842 along San Leandro Creek, across from the home of José Joaquín Estudillo, where he raised cattle, as well as various grains. He supplied visiting ships with rawhide and tallow in return for what he wanted in goods like saddles, fabrics, and wines.

== Personal life ==
Peralta's daughter María Antonia married W.P. Toler, an American soldier who is said to have been the person who raised the American flag at the Battle of Monterey. Toler built a two-story frame house for himself and his new bride, and Peralta looked to have his son-in-law build something fancier than their adobe residence.

== Death ==
After Peralta's death, his wife sold the house and moved into a smaller house the Tolers built on the land.
