= Someone to Watch Over Me =

Someone to Watch Over Me may refer to:

- "Someone to Watch Over Me" (song), a 1926 song written by George and Ira Gershwin
- Someone to Watch Over Me (album), a 2011 album by Susan Boyle
- Someone to Watch Over Me (film), a 1987 film starring Tom Berenger and Mimi Rogers
- Someone to Watch Over Me (TV series), a 2016 Philippine television series
- "Someone to Watch Over Me", a 1991 episode of the radio series Adventures in Odyssey

== Television episodes ==
- "Someone to Watch Over Me" (ALF), 1988
- "Someone to Watch Over Me" (Ballykissangel), 1997
- "Someone to Watch Over Me" (Battlestar Galactica), 2009
- "Someone to Watch Over Me" (Born and Bred), 2005
- "Someone to Watch Over Me" (Crossing Jordan), 2006
- "Someone to Watch Over Me" (Frasier), 1995
- "Someone to Watch Over Me" (Goodnight Sweetheart), 1996
- "Someone to Watch Over Me" (Holby City), 2007
- "Someone to Watch Over Me" (Jake and the Fatman), 1989
- "Someone to Watch Over Me" (Nightingales), 1993
- "Someone to Watch Over Me" (Pretty Little Liars), 2011
- "Someone to Watch Over Me" (Star Trek: Voyager), 1999
- "Someone to Watch Over Me" (Step by Step), 1992

== See also ==
- Someone Who'll Watch Over Me, a 1992 play by Frank McGuinness
- "Someone to Witch Over Me", a 2004 episode of Charmed
