= Watch Over Me (novel) =

2020 novel by Nina LaCour

- Author: Nina LaCour
- Language: English
- Subject: Trauma, Solitude, Ghosts
- Genre: Young adult fiction
- Publisher: Dutton Children's Books
- Publication date: September 15, 2020
- Media type: Print
- Pages: 272
- ISBN: 9780593108970

Watch Over Me is a young adult novel by Nina LaCour, published September 15, 2020 by Dutton Books for Young Readers.

== Reception ==
Watch Over Me received starred reviews from Kirkus, Booklist, Publishers Weekly, and School Library Journal. The book is a Junior Library Guild selection.

In reviews, the book was called a "gripping ... emotion-packed must-read," "a painfully compelling gem from a masterful creator," and a "[m]oving, unsettling, and full of atmospheric beauty."

The audiobook received a starred review from School Library Journal, as well as a positive review from Booklist.

The New York Public Library, Chicago Public Library, BuzzFeed, and Kirkus named it one of the best books of the year.

Accolades for Watch Over Me
Year	Accolade	Result	Ref.
2021	YALSA's Amazing Audiobooks for Young Adults	Selection	
2021	YALSA's Best Fiction for Young Adults	Selection	
2020	Chicago Public Library Best Teen Fiction of the Year	Selection	
2020	BuzzFeed Best Young Adult Books of the Year	Selection	
2020	Kirkus Best Books of the Year	Selection	
2020	New York Public Library Best Books for Teens	Selection	
