= Southside, Berkeley, California =

Neighborhood of Berkeley, California, US

Southside
- Neighborhood of Berkeley
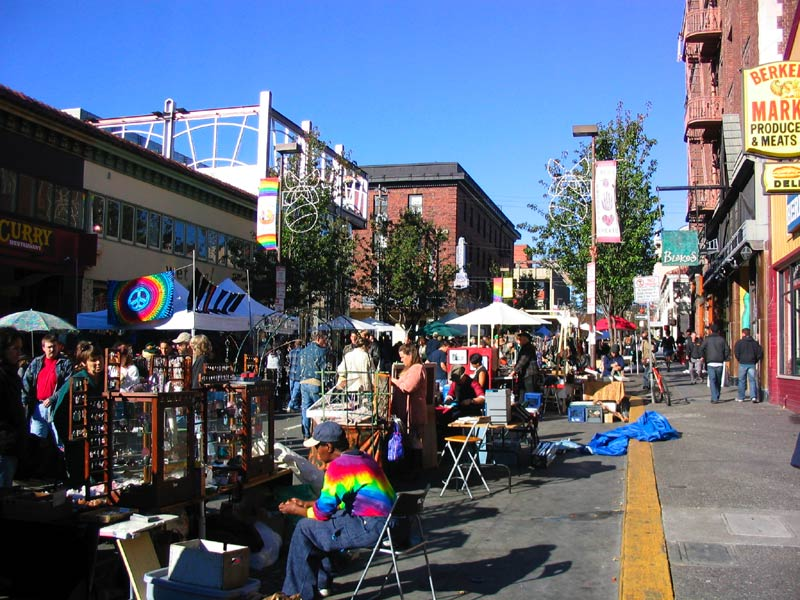
- Telegraph Avenue during a street fair
- Nicknames: South of Campus, South Campus
- Location within Berkeley and the East Bay
- Coordinates: 37.8678°N 122.2590°W
- Country: United States
- State: California
- County: Alameda
- City: Berkeley

Southside, also known by the older names South of Campus or South Campus, is a neighborhood in Berkeley, California. Southside is located directly south of and adjacent to the University of California, Berkeley campus. Because of the large student presence in the neighborhood, proximity to Sproul Plaza, and history of the area, Southside is the neighborhood most closely associated with the university.

== History ==
Southside began in the 1860s as a real estate development by the private College of California, the predecessor to the university. The trustees of the College needed to buy a large farm to the east of the College's planned campus to secure its water rights over the headwaters of Strawberry Creek. To raise money for that project, they decided to also buy land to the south of the planned campus at the same time and sell lots adjacent to the campus to create a college town. They initially hired Frederick Law Olmsted to plan the new town, but eventually decided to go for a more traditional grid layout. Except for a small area around Piedmont Avenue designed by Olmsted, the streets were laid out in a 1/8 by 1/8 mile grid, and named alphabetically for prominent academics.

The east-west oriented streets were named in order from the northernmost to the southernmost street: Allston, Bancroft, Channing, and Dwight, all of which retain their old names. The north-south oriented streets were named from easternmost to westernmost: Audubon (now College), Bowditch, Choate (now Telegraph), Dana, Ellsworth, and Fulton. These initial blocks have been subdivided by the insertion of Durant Avenue, and Haste, Kittredge, and Atherton Streets.

The neighborhood didn't begin to grow until after 1873, when the university moved to Berkeley from Downtown Oakland. The neighborhood was connected to Oakland by a horsecar (then streetcar) line along present-day Telegraph Avenue. It grew steadily over the next few decades, with a business district along the streetcar line, and farmhouses and mansions, then rooming-houses, apartments, hotels, churches, and new streets filling the large blocks.

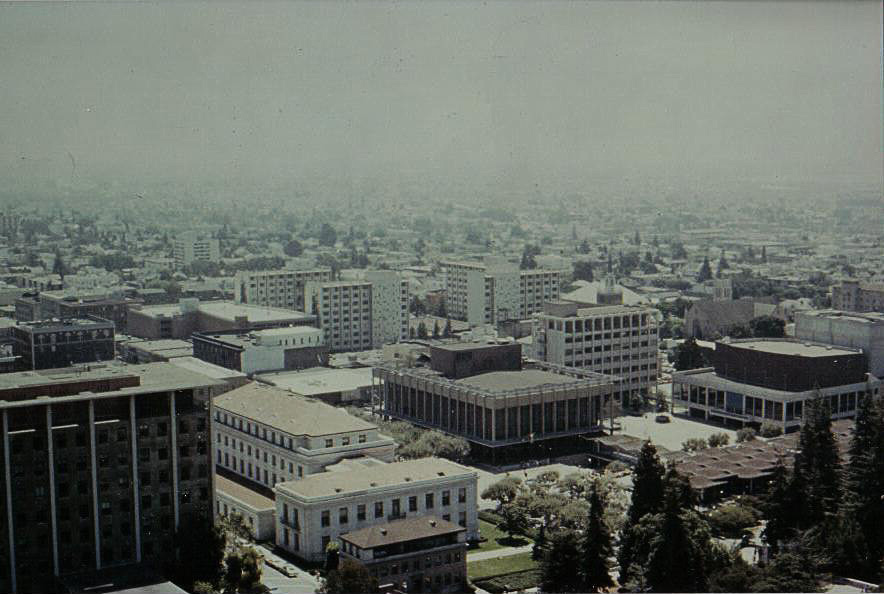
This 1978 view over the neighborhood shows Sproul Plaza and the Unit 3 dormitory complex.

By the 1920s the area was a dense urban neighborhood extending as far north as Strawberry Creek. In the 1930s the university campus began expanding southward into the neighborhood, beginning with Edwards Stadium and Harmon Gym. In the 1950s, '60s, and '70s, the entire area north of Bancroft Way was acquired by the university and demolished for new campus buildings and Sproul Plaza. During this time the university also greatly expanded its student housing, taking several city blocks within Southside by eminent domain to construct high-rise dormitory "units". One of the blocks acquired and demolished during this wave of expansion became the centerpiece of a conflict with people who wanted it to become a neighborhood park. The protests and riots over People's Park became one of the symbolic events of the 1960s, and the park remains a source of controversy and conflict today.

== Today ==
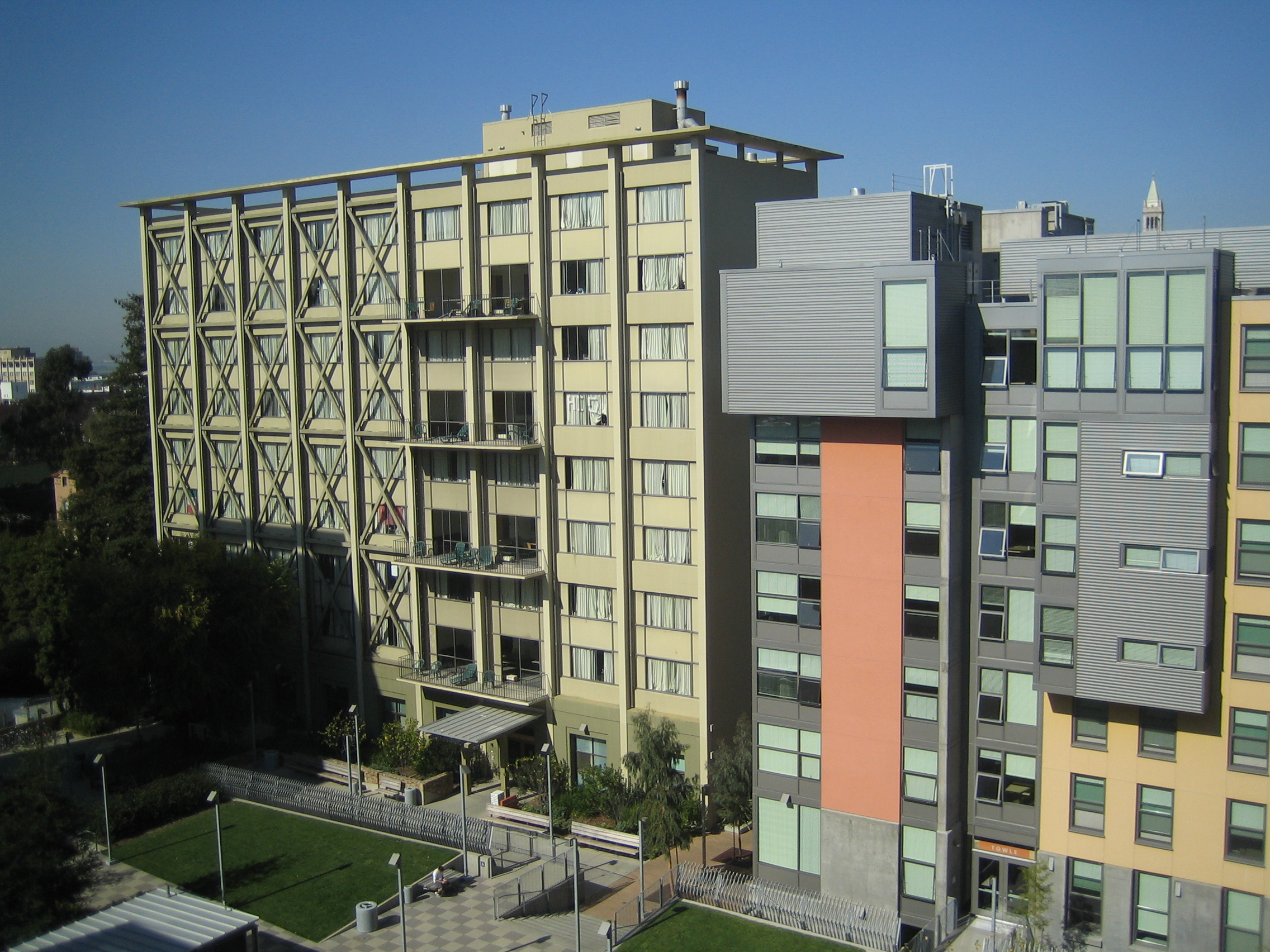
The Unit 2 dormitory complex. The building on the left was part of the original construction, the one on the right is a new addition.

The boundaries of Southside extend roughly from Bancroft Way to the north to Dwight Way to the south, east of Fulton Street and west of Panoramic Hill. In the 2000 US Census, the neighborhood had a population density of approximately 30,000 people per square mile, making it the most densely populated neighborhood in Berkeley. The neighborhood had a median age of 21 years, lower than every other neighborhood in the area, reflecting the dominant student population. The intersection of Bancroft Way and Telegraph Avenue serves as the primary gateway to UC Berkeley, and Telegraph is a major pedestrian thoroughfare as well as a shopping area, with sidewalk vendors and stores catering mainly to students and out-of-town visitors. Durant Avenue east of Telegraph has many cheap restaurants, many of them Asian, earning it the nickname "the Asian Ghetto" among Berkeley students. Fraternities and sororities are clustered in the eastern end of the neighborhood around Piedmont Avenue, which has become known as "Frat row".

During the fall of 2010, the Berkeley Student Food Collective opened after many protests on the UC Berkeley campus due to the proposed opening of the fast food chain Panda Express. Students and community members worked together to open a collectively-run grocery store right off of the UC Berkeley campus, where the community can buy local, seasonal, humane, and organic foods at prices that everyone can afford. The Berkeley Student Food Collective still runs to this day at 2440 Bancroft Way.

== Government ==
Southside constitutes the majority of Berkeley's District 7 and is represented by Cecilia Lunaparra.

== See also ==
- Barrington Hall
- Berkeley Art Museum and Pacific Film Archive
- Berkeley City Club
- California Memorial Stadium
- Cody's Books
- Downtown Berkeley
- Free Speech Movement
- List of Berkeley neighborhoods
- Northside, Berkeley, California
- The Chandler Building
- Sather Gate
- Student ghetto
