= Northbrae, Berkeley, California =

Neighborhood in Berkeley, California, USA

Northbrae
- Neighborhood of Berkeley
- Location within Berkeley and the East Bay
- Coordinates: 37°53′20″N 122°16′21″W
- Country: United States
- State: California
- County: Alameda
- City: Berkeley

Northbrae is a neighborhood in Berkeley, California built as part of the early 20th century northern expansion of Berkeley. The name is derived from the Scottish word brae, which means hills, and refers to the communities north of Berryman Street, south of Solano Avenue, east of Spruce and west of Albany. It's bordered by the two commercial districts on Solano Avenue and Hopkins Street, as well as hilly terrain made up of volcanic rock, rhyolite, and 136 stairways carved into the landscape. The Northbrae development area is visibly distinct for its pink sidewalks and many stone pillars topped with concrete globes denoting street names. The central hub of Northbrae is the Fountain at the Circle, a water fountain designed by the head architect of the University of California surrounded by terra cotta roundabout and stairwell. Northbrae made it into the American Planning Association's list of Great Places in America in 2011.

== History ==
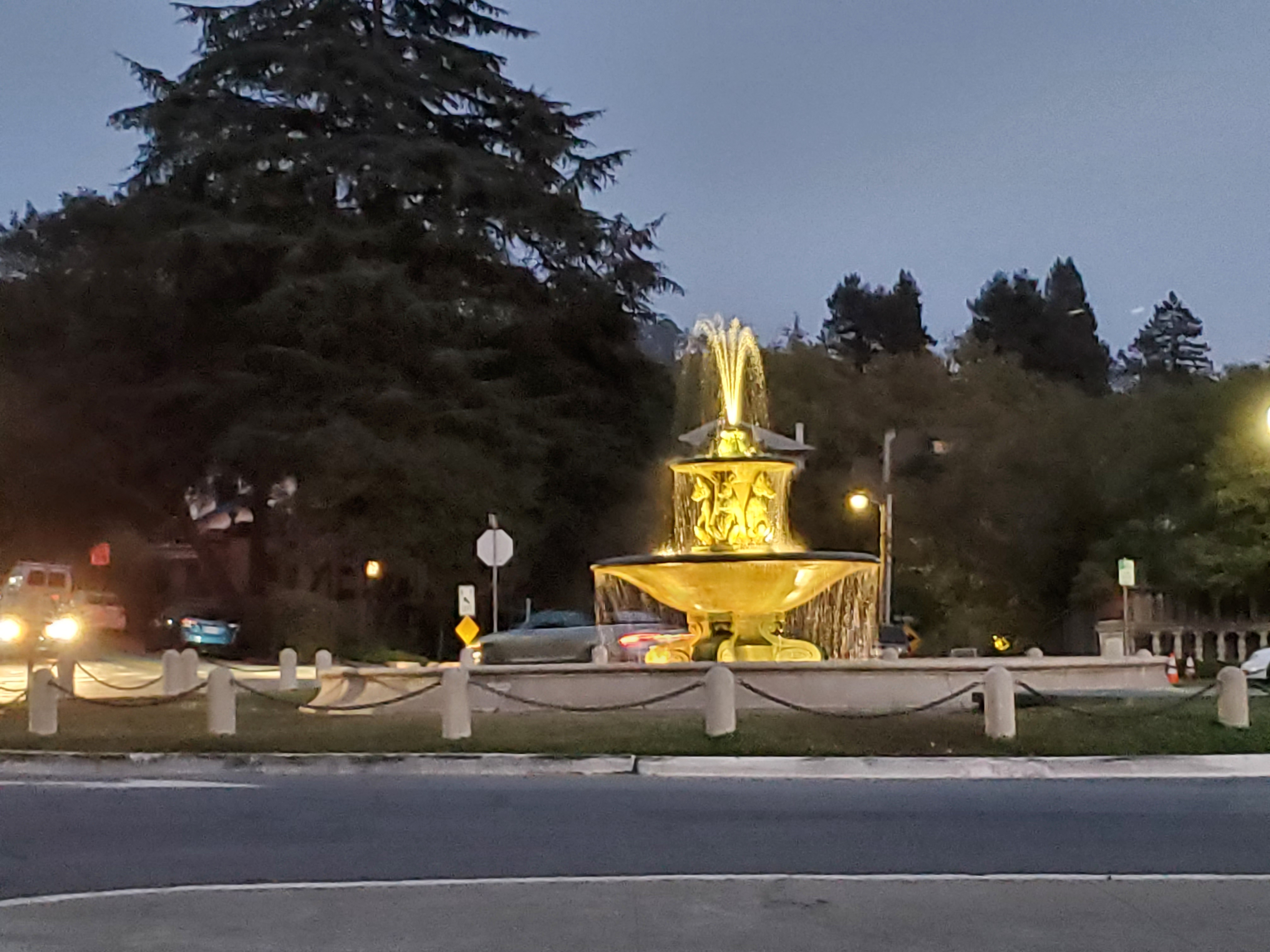
The Fountain at the Circle, centerpiece of Northbrae

After a 1906 earthquake along the western coast, about 15,000 residents from San Francisco decided to move East. Commuter rail had made it possible to now inhabit the countryside and Duncan McDuffie and Joseph Mason took full advantage of this. Under Mason-McDuffie Co., they purchased 700 acres for a subdivision that would eventually be known as Berkeley. Garden suburbs and the Beaux Arts style were prominent influences for this new area. At one point, the local Chamber of Commerce even proposed that Berkeley be named the state capital and the developers named the streets of Northbrae after various California counties but it did not succeed. Northbrae was split up into five sections: "Northbrae" west of The Alameda, "Northbrae Terrace" east of the Alameda and denoted by two pillars rather than just one at each entrance on The Alameda, Berkeley Heights as a predecessor to the Berkeley Hills, Berkeley Square which was north of Marin Avenue and focused along Arlington Avenue and The Alameda, and a small portion called Grand View Terrace which contains the districts most finest homes between Shattuck and Spruce streets. Since then, "Northbrae" has grown to refer to smaller subdivisions bordering the original such as the Peralta Park development around Hopkins or the Highlands development near Eunice Street.

Duncan McDuffie led Berkeley to become the first city in the United States to prohibit multifamily housing through zoning and Northbrae was the widest zoned single-family district. As with all of Mason-McDuffie Co. subdivisions, their homes in Northbrae included deed restrictions prohibiting sale to anyone who wasn't white.

== Natural and physical features ==
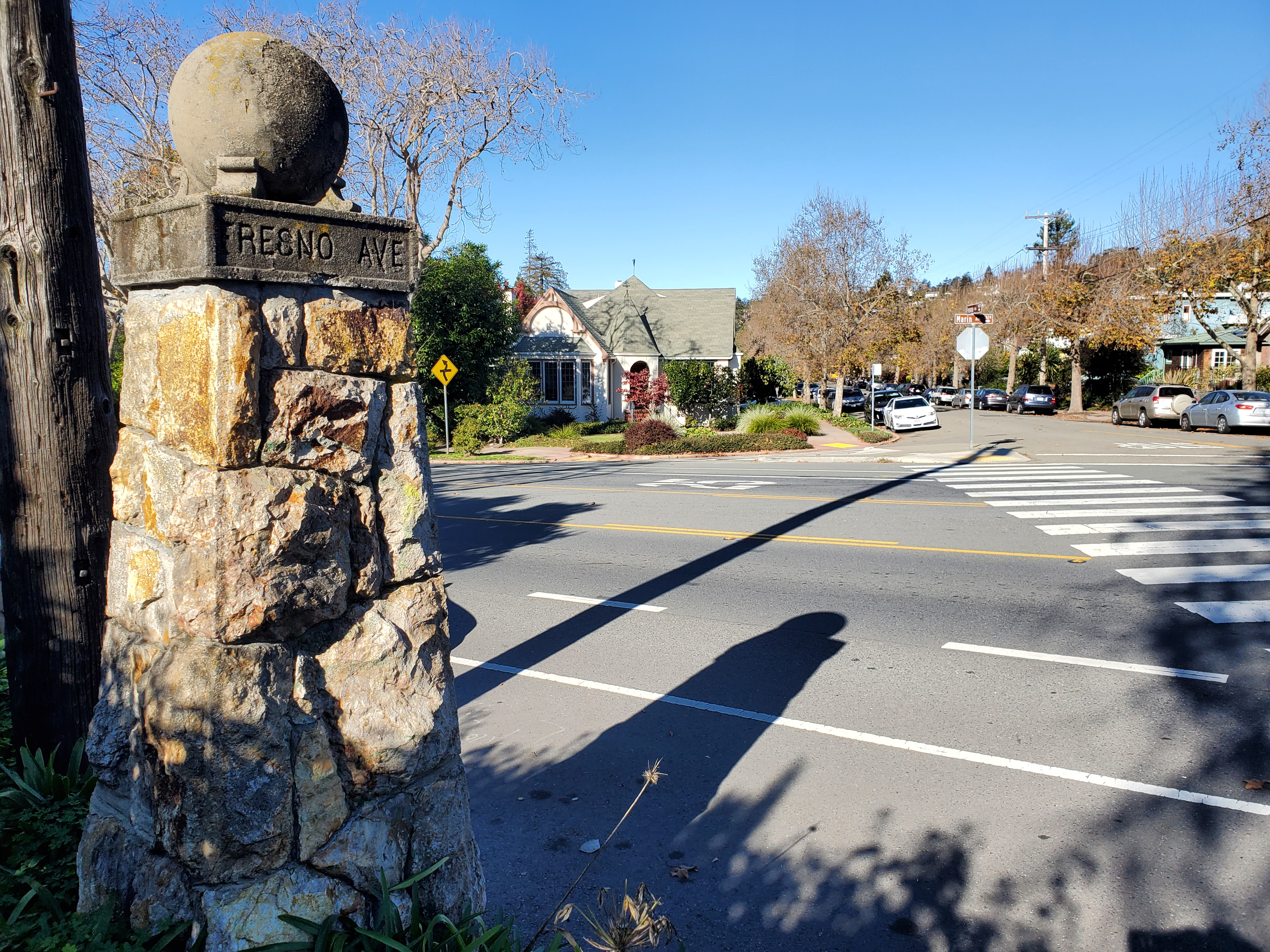
Stone pillars that sit at nearly every intersection in the neighborhood.

The Northbrae neighborhood is known for its hilly terrain. The built environment follows along the natural topography which includes trees and existing outcropping of volcanic rock. The volcanic rock in the area, rhyolite, is primarily composed of quartz and is a significant feature of the area. The streets are arranged predominantly N-S in order to emphasize the views of the San Francisco bay and the hills. Most of the homes are bungalows and are tucked into the hills, connected by stairways that have been carved into the landscape. The original subdivision is visible by its pink colored sidewalks and stone pillars, though several rock pillars have been destroyed by property owners and automobiles over the years. The rock pillars and fountain were designed by John Galen Howard, the lead architect of the University of California, Berkeley campus.

== Notable places and public amenities ==
The North Branch Berkeley Library, the Martin Luther King Middle School, and Solano Avenue shopping district are all integral parts of Berkeley. Northbrae is also home to several large parks. The MLK Middle School runs a program called the Edible Schoolyard that attracts many people every year. There are also many paths in the neighborhood originally built as shortcuts to streetcar lines.

== Transportation ==
The neighborhood was originally designed with the intention of each single family home having direct access to the train under the 1916 zoning law. Today, however, the North Berkeley BART station is a half mile away. Four AC Transit bus lines currently run through the neighborhood. There are 2 bicycle boulevards that promote alternative transportation.
