= Berkeley Food and Housing Project =

Nonprofit organization in Northern California

Berkeley Food and Housing Project (also referred to as BFHP) is a nonprofit organization serving homeless men, women, and children in Berkeley, California and other parts of Northern California. BFHP is one of the largest homeless service providers in the East Bay.

== History ==
The current Berkeley Food and Housing Project evolved from a small group of local churches providing emergency meal service to the transient youths who flooded the area during the Summer of Love in 1969. Initially, First Baptist Church of Berkeley under the leadership of Dr. Raymond P. Jennings began offering a meal service based out of their basement. University Lutheran Chapel and other local churches soon formed a partnership with First Baptist. In 1972, the meal service was renamed the Berkeley Emergency Lifeline. In 1984, the program was composed of several shelters operating out of Berkeley churches.

In 1986, the programs were consolidated into a secular, incorporated organization called Berkeley Emergency Food Project. The City of Berkeley arranged to convert the basement of the downtown Veteran's Building into the Men's Overnight Shelter. In 1991 a women's shelter was founded at a building on Dwight Way, and in 1996 a Multi-Service Center opened on the ground floor of Trinity United Methodist Church. Another location, called Russell Street Residence, opened in 2002 as a California state-licensed board and care facility serving 17 men and women who were once homeless and are diagnosed with a mental disability.

In 2013, BFHP received an award from the VA's Supportive Services for Veteran Families program, which allowed BFHP to start a program to help homeless veteran households in Alameda, Contra Costa, and Solano Counties. In 2017 the program was renamed Roads Home and has since expanded into Sacramento, Amador, and San Joaquin Counties.

Owing to structural issues at the Veteran's Building, in September 2018 the Men's Overnight Shelter and Veterans Transitional Program were moved into the same building as the women's shelter on Dwight Way, with the whole building now branded as the Dwight Way Center.

== Services ==
The Community Meal (formerly known as the Quarter Meal) is the longest running free, weekday community meal program in the City of Berkeley. The meal is served four days a week and guests include those who are homeless and/or unemployed but also many who have housing and jobs and who depended on the program in order to free up income to cover other essentials like rent and utilities. In 2018 BFHP served 20,440 meals at the Community Meal, 18,615 meals at Russell Street Residence, 39,714 meals at both shelters. BFHP's Dwight Way Center in Berkeley accommodates two shelters. The women's shelter (in operation since 1992) and the men's shelter (launched in 1986), each have 32 beds. The Shelter offers those who are homeless a safe place to stay and support while they build income, skills, and seek permanent housing. The Shelter operates 365 days a year.

Beginning in 2019 BFHP has also run the CARE (Coordinated Assessment and Resource) & Warming Center in Concord which serves homeless individuals and families in Contra Costa County. The multi-purpose facility acts as a drop-in center during the day where people who are experiencing homelessness can access services. At night it becomes a low-barrier shelter for homeless individuals and families. The shelter can accommodate 30 people per night. The Contra Costa County CORE Outreach Team offers transportation to the shelter on a nightly basis.

Russell Street Residence was established in 2002 and provides permanent supportive housing for 17 formerly homeless adults diagnosed with serious and persistent mental illness. Residents at Russell Street receive 24/7 care. Staff works with residents to develop independent living skills and assess those who might be ready to move into a more independent setting. BFHP's Shelter Plus Care is a HUD-funded program that provides permanent housing with tenancy support services.

Roads Home is a program of Berkeley Food & Housing Project that works to help end homelessness among veterans and their families. In 2010 BFHP opened a transitional housing program for homeless male veterans in downtown Berkeley. Four years later, the agency was selected as an SSVF grantee, which led to Roads Home becoming a program that provides an array of services to veterans and their families experiencing housing insecurity. Roads Home now includes five sites delivering services across six counties – a territory comprising more than 1,600 square miles.
