= North Berkeley, Berkeley, California =

Neighborhood of Berkeley, California, USA

Coordinates: 37.8763°N 122.2739°W

North Berkeley is a neighborhood of Berkeley, California. It is situated north of downtown, spanning from Hearst Avenue to Eunice Street, and touches the northwest corner of the UC Berkeley campus.

North Berkeley's primary business district is known as the Gourmet Ghetto. The North Berkeley BART station is located just outside the far western edge of the neighborhood; the Downtown Berkeley BART station is closer to the Gourmet Ghetto. North Berkeley is sometimes defined to include the Northbrae and Thousand Oaks neighborhoods; however, all three areas are distinct local neighborhoods.

It contains the Berkeley Rose Garden, and John Hinkel Park.
