= Alice Medrich =

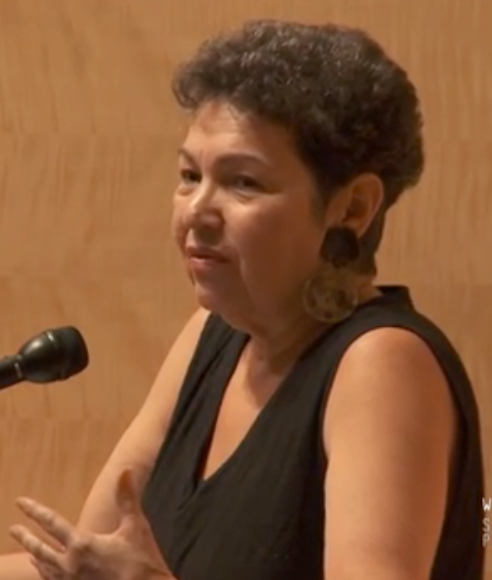
- Speaking at the San Francisco Public Library in 2015
- Occupations: Businesswoman, baker, writer

Alice Medrich is a businesswoman, baker and cookbook author with a particular interest in chocolate. She founded the Cocolat chain of chocolate stores, has authored numerous cookbooks, and is referred to as the First Lady of Chocolate.

== California truffles ==
The New York Times reported that "Chocolate truffles were virtually unknown in the United States when, in 1973, Alice Medrich started making and selling them from her home in Berkeley." Because Medrich's truffles have soft centers, when coated they have a characteristic larger, "lumpy" shape compared to French truffles, and have come to be known as California truffles.

== Books ==
Alice Medrich's cookbooks include Cocolat: Extraordinary Chocolate Desserts (Warner Books, 1990), Chocolate and the Art of Low-Fat Desserts (Warner Books, 1994), Alice Medrich's Cookies and Brownies (Warner Books, 1999), Bittersweet: Recipes and Tales from a Life in Chocolate (Artisan, 2003), Chocolate Holidays (Artisan, 2005; originally published as A Year in Chocolate [Warner Books, 2001]), Pure Dessert (Artisan, 2007), Chewy Gooey Crispy Crunchy Melt-in-Your-Mouth Cookies (Artisan, 2010), and "Flavor Flours" (Artisan, 2014). She is one of the authors of A Baker's Dozen Cookbook (HarperCollins Publishers, 2001) and contributed to the 1997 Joy of Cooking (Simon and Schuster, 1997).

Cocolat won the Cookbook of the Year and Perrier Best Food Photography awards from the James Beard Foundation, and the Julia Child Award: Best First Cookbook and the Best Book: Bread, Other Baking and Sweets award from IACP; it was also named one of the best thirteen baking books by the Beard Foundation in 2010. Chocolate and the Art won the Cookbook of the Year Award from the James Beard Foundation, and was named one of the best books of the last fifteen years by Epicurious.com in 2010. Bittersweet won the Cookbook of the Year and Best Book: Single Subject awards from IACP. Chewy Gooey won the Best Book: Baking Sweet or Savory award from IACP. Cookies and Brownies, Bittersweet, and Chewy Gooey all won Best of the Best Awards from Food and Wine Magazine.

== Cocolat ==
Medrich founded the Cocolat chain of chocolate stores in 1976. By 1990 Cocolat had expanded to seven stores in the San Francisco Bay area. However, the company got into financial difficulty after a deliberately lit fire destroyed its Berkeley headquarters in 1991, causing damages estimated at $2 million, and after the embezzlement of $500,000 by an employee. The latter forced Medrich to sell her interest in the company.
