= Gourmet Ghetto =

Neighborhood in Berkeley, California, US

Coordinates: 37.88°N 122.27°W

The Gourmet Ghetto is a colloquial name for the North Shattuck business district of the North Berkeley neighborhood in the city of Berkeley, California, known as the birthplace of California cuisine. Other developments that can be traced to this neighborhood include specialty coffee, the farm-to-table and local food movements, the rise to popularity in the U.S. of chocolate truffles and baguettes, the popularization of the premium restaurant designed around an open kitchen, and the California pizza made with local produce. After coalescing in the mid-1970s as a culinary destination, the neighborhood received its "Gourmet Ghetto" nickname in the late 1970s from comedian Darryl Henriques. Early, founding influences were Peet's Coffee, Chez Panisse and the Cheese Board Collective. Alice Medrich began her chain of Cocolat chocolate stores there.

The neighborhood, anchored by Alice Waters's Chez Panisse, became the center of farm-to-table food sourcing, using selected locally grown produce, especially naturally and sustainably grown—preferably organic—ingredients. Waters and a loosely organized left-leaning coterie of friends and colleagues actively promoted the idea of socially conscious eating. Many former staff at Chez Panisse have gone on to start their own restaurants, bakeries, and food shops in the wider San Francisco Bay Area.

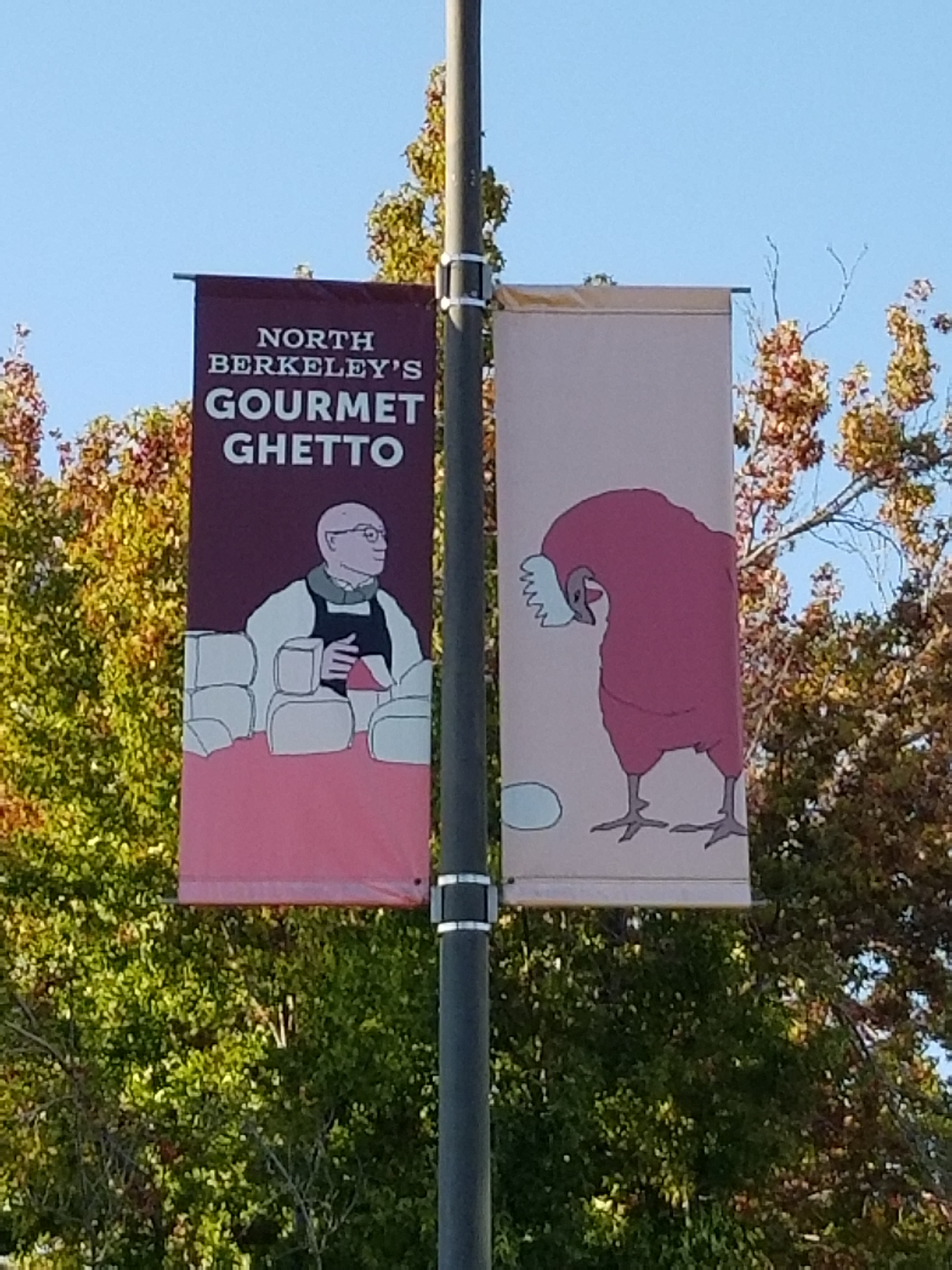
A street banner in Berkeley's "Gourmet Ghetto" neighborhood (2017)

Due to controversy over the name "Gourmet Ghetto", the local business association and the city of Berkeley Planning Department has re-branded the district as North Shattuck, an old name for the area.

== History ==
The Gourmet Ghetto can trace its origins to April 1, 1966, when Dutch-born Alfred Peet opened the first Peet's Coffee location at the corner of Walnut and Vine. Peet's was the first coffee retailer in the U.S. to feature specialty beans from around the world, with darker roasts such as French roast. The store initially sold only whole bean, fresh roasted coffee for home preparation—coffee was brewed only to enable customers to sample the product. Peet had a fiery and temperamental character; he insisted that his patrons follow specific instructions for the preparation of European-style coffee at home. Peet's Coffee kicked off a nationwide trend in specialty coffee.

The activist-oriented Berkeley Co-op grocery store was already in the neighborhood, focusing on natural foods. Also nearby were several neighborhood butcher shops which had survived the trend toward consumers buying pre-packaged meat in a grocery store. Into this mix, catering to European tastes in the manner of Peet's, the Cheese Board was founded a few doors down from Peet's in 1967 by academics Elizabeth and Sahag Avedisian, who wanted to sell fine cheeses while they studied. The success of the business interrupted their studies, so the Avedisians sold the store to their six employees in 1971. The new enterprise was formed as an employee-owned collective and renamed the Cheese Board Collective. The Cheese Board also offered local cheeses, and they baked bread because the combination of bread and cheese was a classic. The sourdough baguette was introduced to the U.S. at the Cheese Board in 1975; it sold very well along with soft cheeses.

Chez Panisse was founded in 1971 by U.C. Berkeley film studies professor Paul Aratow and Alice Waters, who had been a student of the French language, a political activist, and a world traveler. The restaurant opened in an Arts and Crafts-style home on Shattuck Avenue, and featured French-style dinners but made with locally grown ingredients. Waters very actively promoted the idea of an alternate network of food suppliers working together to create flavorful meals. At first, Waters used ingredients bought at the Berkeley Co-op and at smaller markets around Berkeley. The staff foraged for ingredients such as wild blackberries, and neighbors brought produce grown in their backyards. David Lance Goines, Waters's boyfriend and a skilled artist, created posters for the restaurant and other Gourmet Ghetto businesses. With her friends including film scholars Aratow and Tom Luddy, Waters effectively ran a culinary salon at Chez Panisse, to advocate social change with the goal of making locally sourced food economically viable. In February 1973, Waters hired Jeremiah Tower as head chef. Tower increased the focus on salads and local food. Tower says that a turning point in the focus on locally sourced food came in October 1976, when he prepared a regional menu including cream corn soup made in a Mendocino style, oysters from Tomales Bay, cheese from Sonoma, and California-grown fruits and nuts purchased at a farmer's market in San Francisco.

In 1973, Victoria Wise, a former philosophy student and Chez Panisse's first head chef, opened Pig-by-the-Tail, a French-style charcuterie, across the street from Chez Panisse. In December 1973, Alice Medrich began selling her chocolate truffles out of Pig-by-the-Tail; after quickly running out of her first small batch, Wise asked Medrich to deliver 25 dozen every day. This was the start of an American craze for chocolate truffles. Seeking a larger space in July 1975, the Cheese Board Collective moved into the retail space next to Wise. Down Shattuck a couple of blocks was Poulet, a gourmet restaurant which featured the work of Bruce Aidells, who would soon be known for his novel sausage flavors. Later, Aidells founded his own sausage company. Another co-op, the Juice Bar Collective, opened in 1976. In 1977, Medrich opened a chocolate and dessert shop named Cocolat on the same block as Chez Panisse and Pig-by-the-Tail. Medrich's chocolate truffles were somewhat larger and lumpier than their French cousins; these became known as California truffles. Wise says that the arrival of Cocolat was a catalyst, that it "cinched the whole Gourmet Ghetto thing."

In 1980, Chez Panisse opened a more casual dining room upstairs from the original. The second floor cafe operated almost as a second restaurant, with an à la carte menu featuring pasta, pizza and calzone rather than the table d'hôte / prix fixe style downstairs. In the cafe, one of the first California-style pizzas was made in a prominent wood-fired brick oven, using unusual toppings such as goat cheese and duck sausage. The cafe was built around an open kitchen plan so that patrons could watch the food being prepared. Though the open kitchen plan used to exhibit the preparation of food had been used in several other premium restaurants (such as Johnny Kan's in San Francisco's Chinatown in 1953, Fournou's Ovens in San Francisco in 1972, and Depuy Canal House in High Falls, New York, in 1974), Chez Panisse's implementation of the concept influenced chef Wolfgang Puck, who brought it much wider acceptance beginning with his Spago restaurant in Beverly Hills.

Until the late 1980s, the Berkeley Co-op grocery store offered natural foods to residents and chefs of the Gourmet Ghetto. Next door was the French Hotel cafe, which featured cappuccino and espresso coffee.

== Location ==
According to the North Shattuck Association, the Gourmet Ghetto business district runs primarily along Shattuck Avenue, with some shops on Walnut and Vine streets, and is roughly bordered by Rose Street to the north and Delaware Street to the south.

== Controversy ==
The "Gourmet Ghetto" moniker became controversial in 2019 when Nick Cho, co-owner of a new coffee shop in the neighborhood, remarked in an interview with Berkeleyside that he thought it was an inappropriate, offensive name. The North Shattuck Association, which had been using "Gourmet Ghetto" in its marketing, deliberated and decided to drop the phrase and remove the street-side banners that used it.

== See also ==
- Local food
- Berkeley Student Food Collective
