= Cheese Board Collective =

Worker cooperative in Berkeley, California, US

Coordinates: 37°52′48″N 122°16′10″W

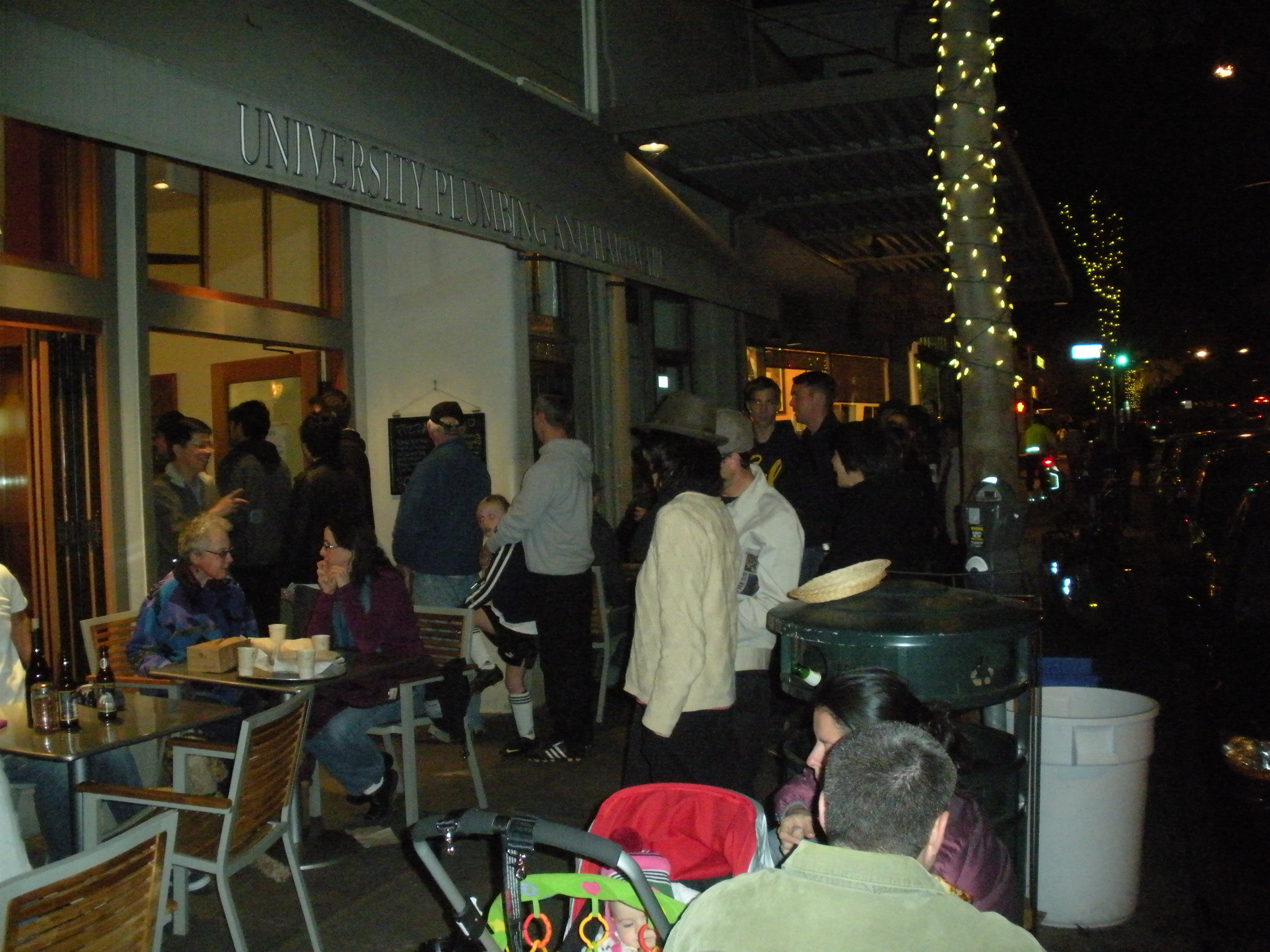
- Exterior of Cheese Board Pizza

Restaurant information
- Established: 1967; 59 years ago
- Owner: Collectively owned
- Food type: Cheese shop/bakery and pizzeria
- Location: Berkeley, California, U.S.
- Website: cheeseboardcollective.coop

The Cheese Board Collective in Berkeley, California, comprises two worker-owned-and-operated businesses: a cheese shop/bakery commonly referred to as "The Cheese Board" and a pizzeria known as "Cheese Board Pizza". Along with Peet's Coffee, the Cheese Board is known for its role in starting the North Shattuck neighborhood of Berkeley on its way to becoming famous as a culinary destination: the "Gourmet Ghetto". The bakery brought the French baguette into vogue for Berkeley consumers, and helped spark a revolution in artisan bread.

The Cheese Board is located at 1504 Shattuck Avenue and Cheese Board Pizza is located two doors down the street at 1512 Shattuck Avenue. In 2003, the Cheese Board Collective put together a cookbook, The Cheese Board: Collective Works.

== History ==
=== Founding and collectivization ===
The Cheese Board was founded in 1967 as a European-inspired cheese shop by the married couple of Elizabeth Magarian Valoma and Sahag Avedisian in a small storefront at 2114 Vine Street in Berkeley. In 1971, the owners converted their business from a conventional privately owned firm to an egalitarian worker-owned collective by distributing shares in the business equally between themselves and their six employees and equalizing the wages of all of the new worker/owners. The collective have annual beach parties and New Year's celebrations and own land in Mendocino County on which they built a cabin.

=== Bread ===
By 1975, the Cheese Board began to experiment with baking bread, originally in small quantities as an informal, impromptu sideline to cheese. The bread sales marked a shift from a purely mercantile business model of buying and selling cheese to a mixed model that combines on-site, artisanal hand-production with domestic and import retail. The sale of baked goods grew rapidly, the baguette in particular. The Cheese Board popularized the baguette for U.S. customers. Bread now accounts for a significant portion of the store's business. As the sale of bakery products grew, so did the variety of breads, pastries, and other baked goods offered. While waiting to be served, customers take a playing card instead of a number.

=== Pizza ===
The store began offering pizza in 1985 as a sideline during an economic downturn and in 1990 opened the semi-autonomous Cheese Board Pizza in what had been a deli called Pig-by-the-Tail Charcuterie. Cheese Board Pizza is unusual in that only one type of pizza (always vegetarian) is made each day and no substitutions are allowed. Because the same product is continually being produced, customers always receive their pizza fresh from the oven without pre-ordering. Each order comes with an additional thin slice, or sliver, originally a way to compensate for uneven slicing. The Cheese Board staff tend to favor unconventional pizza toppings and use only fresh, seasonal produce. They often have special pizzas to celebrate occasions such as Bastille Day and Indian Independence Day. Their green sauce has influenced sauce offerings at other Bay Area pizzerias.

The pizzeria was renovated in 2000 and wood-framed windows were added that open the dining room to the sidewalk dining area. In the mid-2000s, the restaurant was doubled in size by expanding into the former hardware store next door. As of 2011, it still has a piano and hosts unscheduled jazz performances.

=== The Cheese Board and the "Gourmet Ghetto" ===
The Cheese Board was one of the first gourmet establishments in north Berkeley (along with Peet's Coffee) and its success contributed greatly to the development of the area into the "Gourmet Ghetto" it has become. Alice Waters, the founder of Chez Panisse, wrote in a foreword to the collective's cookbook that she chose to locate her restaurant in North Berkeley "so the Cheese Board would be nearby, because I knew I would be among friends".

=== Contribution to the cooperative movement ===
The Cheese Board has helped launch other cooperatives throughout its history. In 1971 it bid and won the contract to operate the Swallow Collective Cafe in the Berkeley Art Museum, which was initially staffed by Cheese Board members but eventually became its own cooperative business with as many as 30 members. In 1975 it funded and launched the Juice Bar Collective before similarly spinning off this operation. In 1976 the Cheese Board helped a member begin a cheese store on Donner Pass. In the 1980s, the Cheese Board contributed money and labor to a Bay Area cooperative network known as the Intercollective, a precursor to the present-day Network of Bay Area Worker Cooperatives. Through the Intercollective it funded the printing of a directory, map, and essays about local collectives, as well as a 1981 conference.

In the mid-1990s, after creating the Cheese Board Pizza, the collective continued its pattern of incubating new businesses, rather than expanding, by helping to create the Arizmendi Association of Cooperatives, which has used the Cheese Board's recipes and organizational structure to launch bakeries in Oakland (1997), San Francisco (2000 and 2010), Emeryville (2003), and San Rafael (2010). All of the Arizmendi Bakeries are independently owned and operated, but share a technical support staff who provide financial, legal, and organizational services, and who are paid to continue replicating the model; all have won a local newspaper "Best Bakery" award.

The Cheese Board is an active member of the Network of Bay Area Worker Cooperatives and the United States Federation of Worker Cooperatives.
