= Luis María Peralta =

Californian rancher and soldier in the Spanish Army

Luis María Peralta (1759 in Sonora, New Spain – August 26, 1851) was a Californio ranchero and soldier in the Spanish Army. Peralta received Rancho San Antonio, one of the largest of the rancho grants in California, covering 44,800 acres (181 km^{2}) that encompassed most of the East Bay region of the Bay Area in Northern California.

== Biography ==
The Peralta family (the 17-year-old Luis, his father, mother and three siblings) was part of the group of settlers that arrived in Alta California with Juan Bautista de Anza on his 1776 expedition. This group of settlers subsequently helped found the Presidio of San Francisco, Mission Santa Clara, and the Pueblo of San José. When he reached the age of 21, Luis entered, as was traditional, into the military of the King of Spain.

Upon his marriage to María Loreto Alviso in 1784, Luis transferred from the Monterey to the San Francisco Company serving with the Escolta (guards) at Mission Santa Clara, Mission San José and as corporal of the guard at Mission Santa Cruz. Phyllis Filiberti Butler records in her book, The Valley of Santa Clara, Historic Buildings, 1792–1920, that after an attack on the priest and majordomo of Mission San José in 1805, "he led the full garrison from the fort at San Francisco into the San Joaquin Valley in pursuit of the Indians." Surprising the Indians in their village, Peralta won a swift victory, which enhanced his reputation. Then a sergeant, he was honored by appointment as comisionado in charge of Pueblo San José in 1807, the highest military and civilian official. Peralta held this position until 1822, when the position ended with Mexico's independence from Spain.

In 1804, he moved into what is now known as the Peralta Adobe, the oldest building in San José. In 1820, he was rewarded for his long service with the Rancho San Antonio land grant. He never lived on the rancho, however, but his four sons, Hermenegildo Ignacio, José Domingo, Antonio María, and José Vicente, did. In 1842 he split the rancho among them, leaving his five daughters (Note: Through his daughter María Luisa Fermina Peralta (b. 27 August 1790, d. 12 August 1865),) his cattle, his adobe, and the land on which it sat. He died in 1851 in San José.

Peralta's most famous descendant is the Latin American revolutionary Che Guevara.

== See also ==
- Kellersberger's Map of Peralta's split rancho, which later became Oakland and Berkeley, California and other cities.
