= Rancho San Antonio (Peralta) =

Spanish land grant in California

Rancho San Antonio (Peralta Grant)
- Location within the East Bay
- 37°43′50.64″N 122°9′41.4″W
- Location: Northern portion of Alameda County, California

History
- Built: 1820

California Historical Landmark
- Designated: 1936
- Reference no.: 246

Rancho San Antonio, also known as the Peralta Grant, was a 44,800-acre (181 km^{2}) land grant by Governor Pablo Vicente de Solá, the last Spanish governor of California, to Don Luís María Peralta, a sergeant in the Spanish Army and later, commissioner of the Pueblo of San José, in recognition of his forty years of service. The grant, issued on August 3, 1820, embraced the sites of the cities of San Leandro, Oakland, Alameda, Emeryville, Piedmont, Berkeley, and Albany.

== History ==
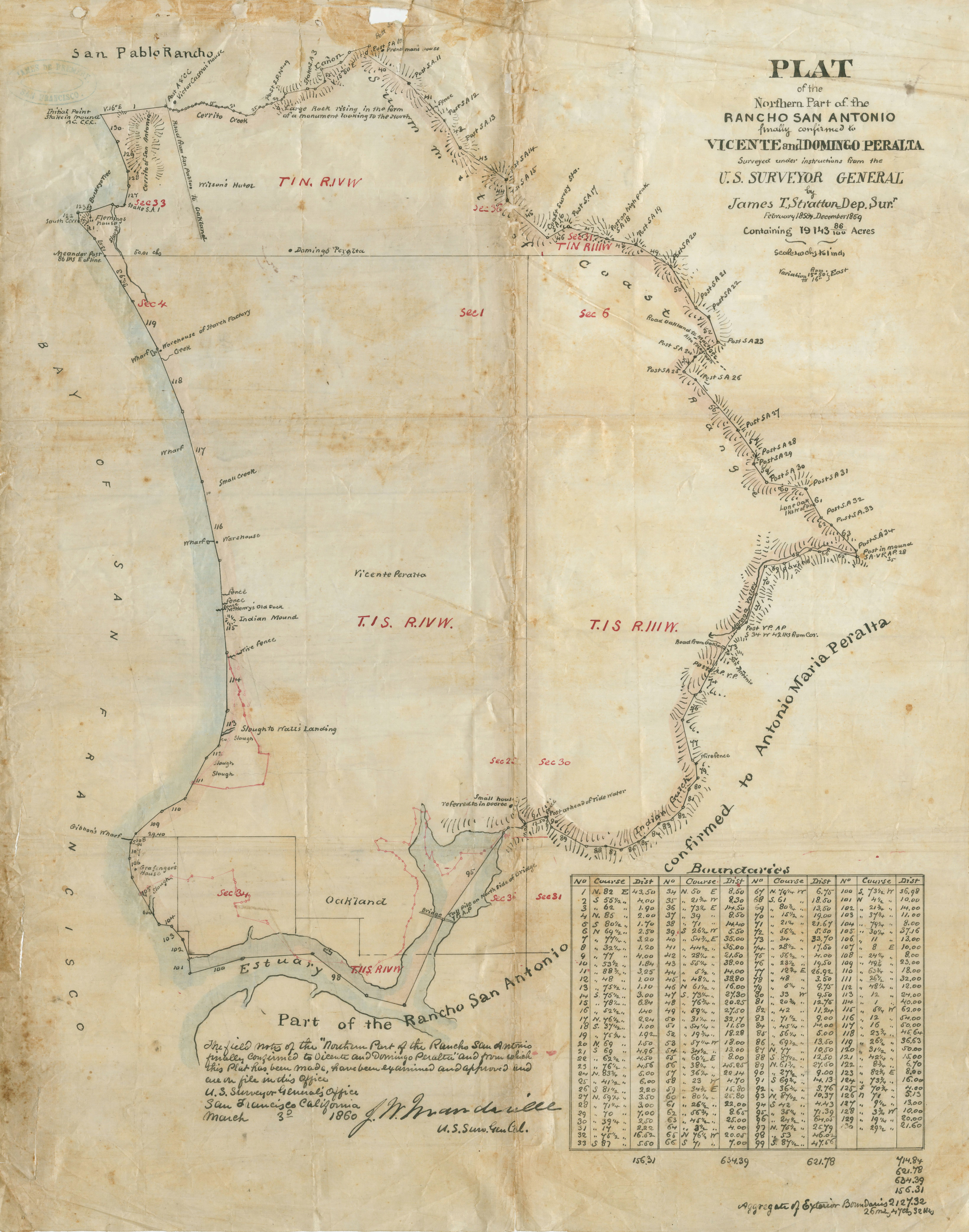
Map of the northern part of Rancho San Antonio, 1859

Luís María Peralta never lived on the rancho himself, but his four sons and their families did. With their wives, families, landless Spanish-Mexican laborers (from New Spain), their families, and some native peoples, the Peralta sons established the first Spanish-speaking communities in the East Bay. As the rancho prospered, the Peralta brothers built newer and bigger houses. The main hacienda contained two adobes, and some twenty guest houses, and became an established stop for travelers along what was during the Spanish era the only camino real on the eastern side of San Francisco Bay.

The hacienda became the social and commercial center of this vast rancho. Annual rodeos and cattle round-ups, horse racing, and games often took place here. The Peraltas eventually had over 8,000 head of cattle and 2,000 horses grazing on the rancho, and built a wharf on the bay near the hacienda headquarters in order to trade the rawhide and tallow produced by their cattle. The Peralta family built a total of 16 houses over a fifty-year period on Rancho San Antonio. There were eleven adobes, three frame houses, one brick house, and one built of "logs and dirt" (the very first structure built). Son Domingo's home was located on Codornices Creek adjacent to the site of what is today St. Mary's College High School. Son Vicente's home was located in what is today the heart of Oakland's Temescal district.

In 1842, Luís María Peralta decided to split the rancho among his sons. His five daughters received his cattle and his San Jose adobe (the Peralta Adobe) and land. He died in 1851, but not before telling his sons to steer clear of the California gold rush, stating, "The land is our gold." However, it would not be easy for the Peraltas to hold on to their property.

Although the United States government promised all rights of citizenship and property ownership to the Californios through the Treaty of Guadalupe Hidalgo signed at the end of the Mexican–American War in 1848, the California Land Act of 1851 required the Californios to prove their land titles in court. The resulting litigation lasted years. In the interim, squatters continued to overrun Rancho San Antonio, stealing and killing cattle and even subdividing and selling land belonging to the Peraltas. Although the United States Supreme Court confirmed the Peralta title in United States v. Peralta (60 U.S. 343) in 1856, the Peralta family had their own internal title dispute to resolve. Left out of the distribution of the land grant, the Peralta sisters felt cheated out of the family land, and contested their brothers' sole claim to the Rancho San Antonio land grant. The court case, known as the "Sisters Title case" was eventually resolved in the brothers' favor by the California Supreme Court in 1859.

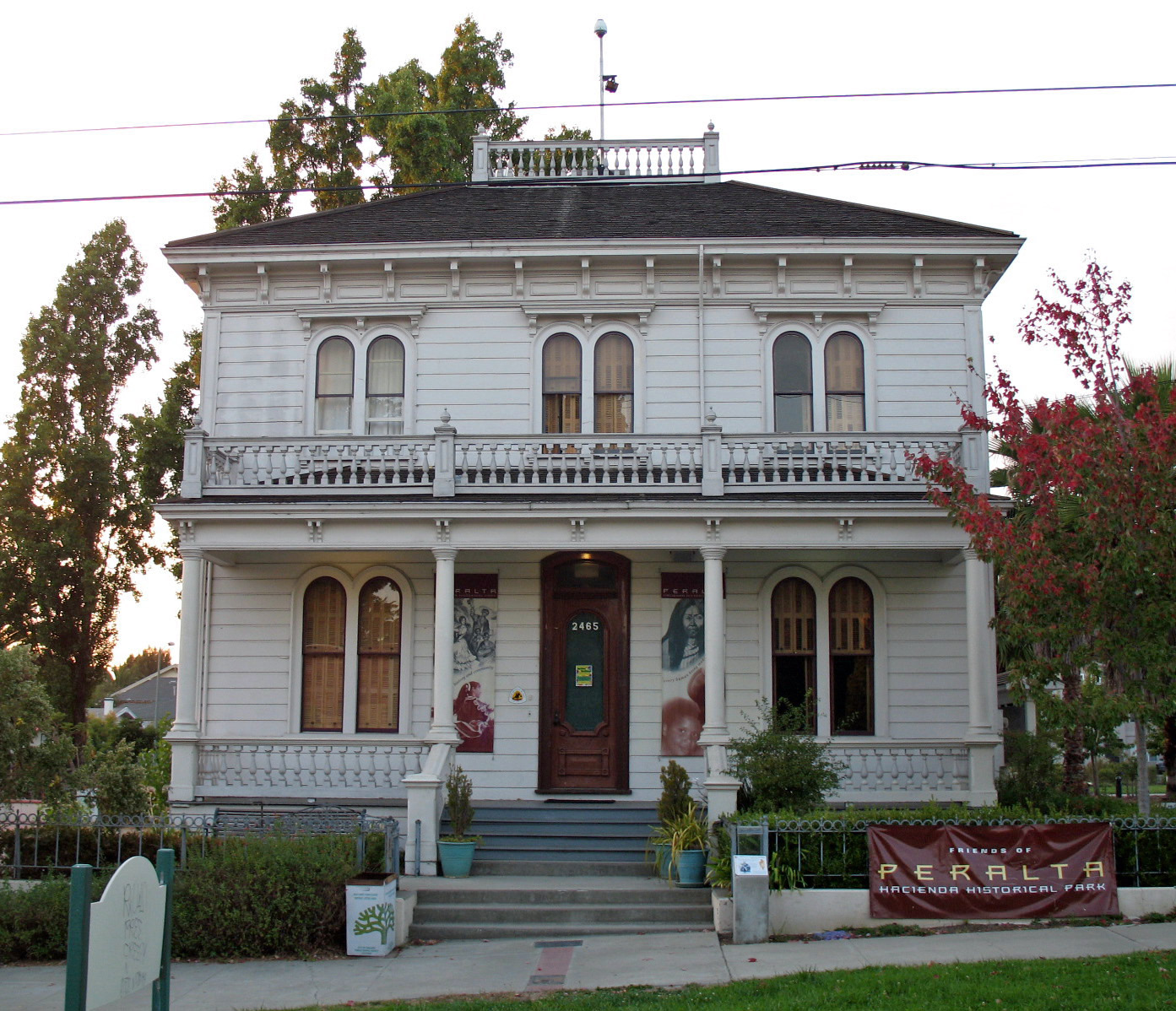
Antonio Maria Peralta House, 1870

By 1860, the brothers' land holdings had been substantially reduced, partly to pay for the previous decade's litigation and to cover newly imposed property taxes. Among the lawyers representing them were Horace Carpentier who acquired large chunks of the Peralta lands as compensation for his services. After the 1868 Hayward earthquake destroyed many of the rancho's buildings, Antonio (the third son), built what is now known as the Peralta Hacienda, an Italianate Victorian two-story frame house in 1870, located in what is today the Fruitvale district of Oakland.

In 1872, the combined property of the sons of Luís María Peralta was assessed at approximately $200,000 (their father's estate had been valued at $1,383,500 at the time of his death, equivalent to $40 million in 2025). By the time of Antonio Peralta's death in 1879, he only had 23 acres (93,000 m^{2}) left of the original 16,067 acres (65.02 km^{2}) his father gave him.

In the end, the 1870 house and the remnants of Antonio's share of the land grant were sold by his daughter Inez Galindo in 1897 to developer Henry Z. Jones who laid out streets and parcels and moved the 1870 house to its present location. That house and a brick house (the Peralta Home built by the eldest son Ignacio in 1860) are the only two remaining structures out of the entire complex. The 1870 house now sits in Peralta Hacienda Historical Park in Oakland and is open for tours.

== Historic designations ==
- Rancho San Antonio, California Historical Landmark #246 (the commemorative plaque can be found in San Leandro).
- Joaquin Miller House
  - National Historic Landmark
  - National Register of Historic Places, NPS-66000204.
  - California Historical Landmark #107
  - Oakland Designated Landmark #5
- Antonio Maria Peralta House
  - National Register of Historic Places 77000285
  - California Historical Landmark #925
  - Oakland Designated Landmark #10
- Camino of Rancho San Antonio, California Historical Landmark #299: The road ran from Mission San José to Fruitvale and later to San Pablo by way of Oakland and El Cerrito.
- Tower to John C. Frémont, Oakland Designated Landmark #4
