= West Berkeley, Berkeley, California =

Neighborhood in Berkeley, California, USA

Coordinates: 37°52′28″N 122°17′55″W

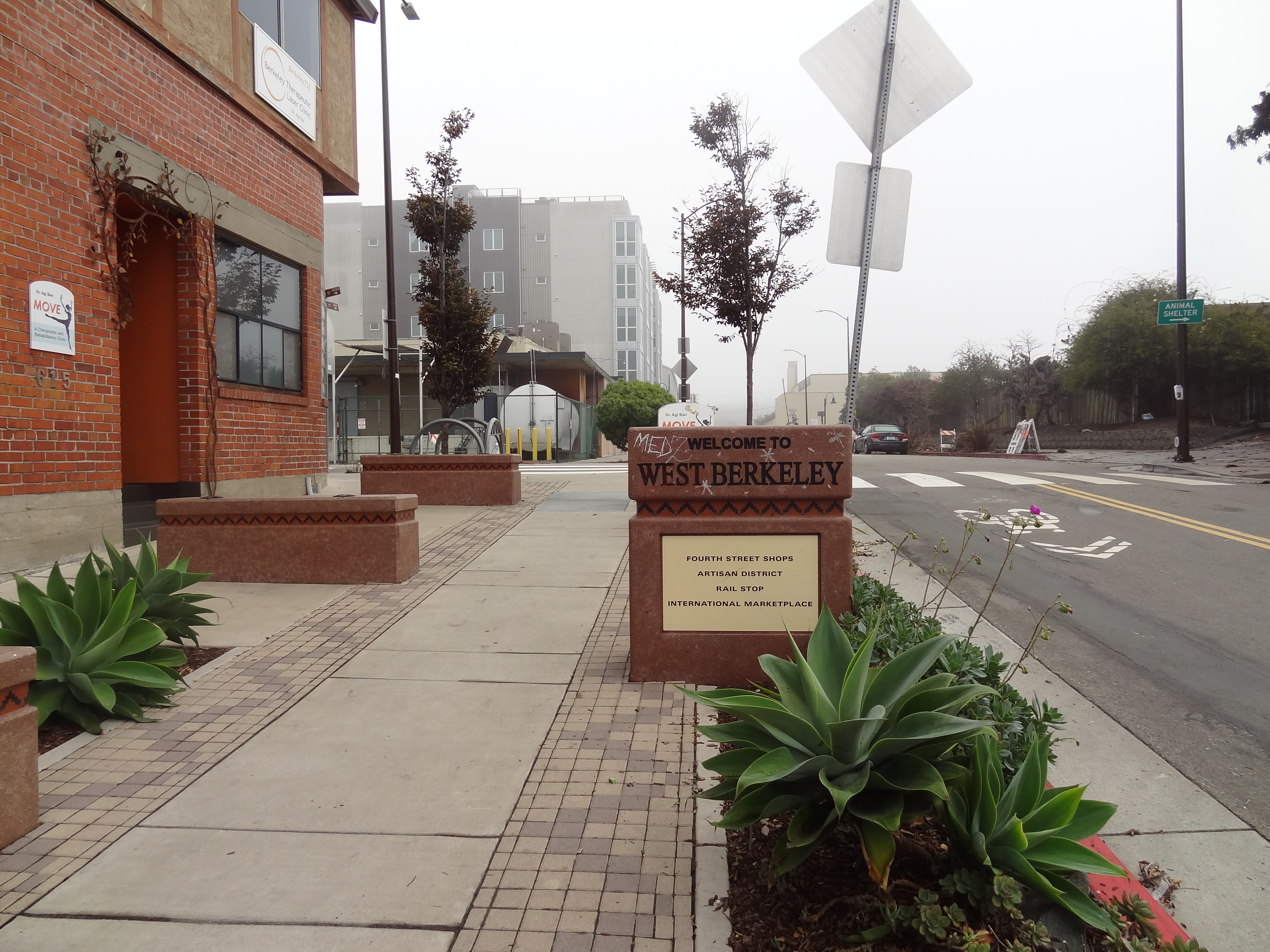
West Berkeley

West Berkeley is generally the area of Berkeley, California, that lies west of San Pablo Avenue (though sometimes it may also refer to the larger area west of Sacramento Street though this includes Westbrae), abutting San Francisco Bay. It includes the area that was once the unincorporated town of Ocean View, as well as the filled-in areas along the shoreline west of I-80 (the Eastshore Freeway), mainly including the Berkeley Marina. It lies at an elevation of 23 feet (7 m).

== History ==
The area's first inhabitants were indigenous people who settled along Strawberry Creek around 3700 BC. They built one of the largest – and possibly the first – of the 425 shell mounds around San Francisco Bay. Archaeologists estimate that native people lived on or near the West Berkeley Shellmound for 4,500 years. They abandoned the West Berkeley Shellmound around 800 AD. However, where the people went is still a mystery. They may have associated with other mound dwellers or left the area entirely. The extant Ohlone tribe may be their descendants. In 2020, the National Trust for Historic Preservation named the Shellmound as one of America's most endangered historic places.

Ocean View was the name of a stagecoach stop established by former sea captain William J. Bowen along the Contra Costa Road (today's San Pablo Avenue) at what is now the northwest corner of San Pablo and Delaware Street in the 1860s. The name derived from the area's view of the Pacific Ocean through the Golden Gate across San Francisco Bay. The moniker was adopted by the settlement that grew up between the stagecoach stop and the wharf built at the foot of what is now Delaware Street.

Ocean View was ethnically diverse, and included many immigrants and some African-Americans, with jobs in nearby industries and farms. Early immigrants were from Scandinavia (especially Finland), Ireland, Mexico, Chile, Germany, Italy, Canada, Portugal, and China.

Ocean View was included in the incorporation of Berkeley in 1878 and thereafter was known as West Berkeley. Incorporation was followed by rapid residential and industrial growth. The first mayor (technically, the President of the Board of Trustees) of the newly incorporated Town of Berkeley was elected from Ocean View, Abel Whitton of the Workingman's Party; he served from 1878 to 1881. Ocean View was also, briefly (1908-9), the name of what is now Albany, California, just north of Berkeley. Ocean View was primarily an industrial, working class community.

The earliest school in what is now Berkeley was the Ocean View School located on the southeast corner of Virginia Street and San Pablo Avenue, established in 1856. The creek that flowed adjacent to the school was dubbed "Schoolhouse Creek". The school was subsequently renamed The San Pablo Avenue School, and again later The Franklin Elementary School. Nothing of the original Ocean View School building remains. In June 2002, The Franklin Elementary School was closed and transformed into the Berkeley Adult School which opened on September 7, 2004.

The name "Ocean View" was revived during the 1970s when neighbors fought against the City's West Berkeley Redevelopment Project. Those struggling to save what remained of the old Victorian neighborhood coalesced to form the Ocean View Committee. The OVC, in association with Berkeley preservationists, assemblymen and congressmen, succeeded in saving Ocean View.

The area later went on to experience a full revival of apartment building and commerce. Beginning in the late 1970s, the development of the retail commercial area along 4th Street led to a gradual gentrification of the surrounding residential area. Businesses located there have included Anthropologie, Cody's Books, a Crate & Barrel Outlet, Restoration Hardware, The Oceanview Diner, Builder's Booksource (an architectural bookstore), Aveda, Bare Escentuals and Peet's Coffee and Tea.

Since 2016, the neighborhood has included Urban Adamah, a 2.2-acre (0.89 ha) not-for-profit Jewish farm and education center that donates produce and meals to local food banks.

== The West Berkeley Plan ==
In the late 1970s and early 1980s, rapid gentrification swept through West Berkeley. The primary land-use issue became how to re-use vacated, large industrial sites. Conversions of industrial spaces drove up rents, and gentrification began to drive out the very artists and artisans who had been the attraction.

When in 1984 the Durkee Foods owners moved to convert their canning plant into offices and labs, their artist and industrial tenants staged a public fight against eviction. Artists and craftspeople feared being priced out.

Mayor Loni Hancock and the City Council authorized the creation of an area plan to guide development. While professional planners and governmental decision-makers played a crucial role in facilitating the outcome, it was not a typical urban planning process.

Stakeholder constituencies debated the issues. In earlier decades residents and manufacturers had usually been competitors, but now many residents supported retaining and encouraging light and green industry

City policies were to maintain the historic, architectural, and use character while retaining historic industrial structures.

Tours of West Berkeley – conducted since the 1970s – feature the area's restored buildings.

== Roadways ==
The main east-west thoroughfare in Ocean View was Delaware Street. In later years, it was eclipsed by University Avenue. The main north-south thoroughfare was San Pablo Road (initially called El Camino de la Contra Costa, Americanized to "The Contra Costa Road"). San Pablo Road was subsequently renamed "San Pablo Avenue". In the early 20th century, San Pablo became part of the transcontinental Lincoln Highway. For a time in the 1920s, it was part of US 101-E, but finally was designated US 40.

A new north-south thoroughfare was constructed as part of the same project that built the San Francisco-Oakland Bay Bridge. This was the Eastshore Highway which ran along a landfill causeway along the Berkeley waterfront west of the original shoreline. The emplacement of the causeway created a lagoon, Aquatic Park. The Eastshore Highway connected at intersections with several east-west streets in West Berkeley, including Ashby and University Avenues. US 40 was switched from San Pablo Avenue to the Eastshore Highway upon its opening in 1936.

From 1926 to 1937, University Avenue served as a feeder route for US 40 via a ferry service at the end of the Berkeley Pier, located at the foot of University. The ferry operated between the Hyde Street Pier in San Francisco and the pier, until the Bay Bridge opened.

On January 6, 1940, an overpass was opened, carrying University Avenue over the tracks of the mainline of the Southern Pacific along 3rd Street in West Berkeley, eliminating a dangerous grade crossing and traffic bottleneck for traffic coming on and off the Eastshore Highway at University Avenue. Traffic lights were installed at the Eastshore-University intersection as part of the overpass project.

In 1954, the State of California began a project to convert the Eastshore Highway into a freeway, eliminating all street intersections, replacing them with access ramps at limited locations. Ashby, University and Gilman were the 3 interchange points chosen for Berkeley. During 1956, the University Avenue overpass was extended over the new freeway, becoming part of the new interchange.

In 1964, US 40 became Interstate 80. See also 1964 state highway renumbering (California)

== Transportation ==
The wharf at the foot of Delaware Street began as "Jacobs Landing", named for its builder and proprietor, James H. Jacobs. The wharf was improved and enlarged with the help of Zimri Heywood, the proprietor of a lumberyard at the wharf, and then renamed "Jacobs and Heywood Wharf". Lumber, soap, hay, and many other goods were transhipped from the wharf. Ferry service was established between the wharf and San Francisco in 1874.

In 1876, the Central Pacific Railroad constructed its new main line, part of the transcontinental overland route, along the shoreline. A passenger and freight depot was built at Delaware Street. This was replaced in 1911 by a depot at 3rd Street and University Avenue.

Amtrak's Berkeley Station is now located adjacent to this former depot and provides daily train service.

Local public transportation in the West Berkeley area is provided by AC Transit and Emery Go-Round.

== Industry ==
West Berkeley was one of the Bay Area's principal industrial zones up until about the 1960s, after which it began to decline. Several well-known companies such as Colgate-Palmolive, Heinz, Canada Dry, Pacific Steel Casting, and Cutter Labs had plants in West Berkeley. West Berkeley was also home to Fantasy Studios, a film and music production company.

The drug manufacturer Bayer, who bought Cutter Labs, has a large manufacturing facility in West Berkeley and is the city's largest private-sector employer. In 2009, it contemplated leaving the Berkeley campus to reduce costs, but as of 2014 it has instead expanded its facilities and job footprint.

=== 1892 Giant Powder Company explosion ===
On 9 July 1892 a nitroglycerine explosion at the Giant Powder Company located at Fleming Point, adjacent to West Berkeley, set off a series of three huge explosions in the company store-houses. These consisted of, respectively, 350 tons of giant powder (blasting powder based on dynamite), 150 tons of black powder, and a large quantity of dynamite. Several smaller explosions occurred and hundreds of tons of sulphur stored on the wharf caught fire. Rivers of nitric and sulphuric acid ran out of the factory. Six people were killed and many injured. Buildings all around were destroyed as well as the factory. Buildings on the other side of the bay in San Francisco were also damaged and a ship 150 miles out to sea reported feeling the blast. A woman several miles from the blast was hit on the head by a piece of falling plaster and reportedly went insane.
