= OCSC =

OCSC may refer to:

- Orange County SC, an American professional soccer club in Orange County, California
- Orlando City SC (2010–2014), an American professional soccer club in Orlando, Florida, that played in the USL Pro league
- Orlando City SC, an American professional soccer club in Orlando, Florida, a Major League Soccer (MLS) franchise
- OCSC Sailing
- The Oxford Companion to Spirits & Cocktails, an Oxford University Press publication
