= Rose Pizzeria =

Restaurant in Berkeley, California, U.S.

- Interactive map of Rose Pizzeria

Restaurant information
- Established: December 1, 2021
- Owners: Gerad Gobel; Alexis Rorabaugh
- Location: 1960 University Avenue, Berkeley, California, 94704, United States
- Coordinates: 37°52′18″N 122°16′17″W

Rose Pizzeria is a restaurant in Berkeley, California, owned by Gerad Gobel and Alexis Rorabaugh. It opened in 2021 and in 2024 was listed by The New York Times as one of the 22 best pizzerias in the United States.

== Restaurant ==
Rose Pizzeria was opened in 2021 by Gerad Gobel and Alexis Rorabaugh, a married couple from the Bay Area who had previously operated an Italian restaurant in Chicago. The restaurant seats up to 22 and has a rose garden for outdoor dining. As of January 2023 it serves 9 varieties of thin-crust pizza, in a style described by Gobel as "a mix of Neapolitan and New York", made with vegan dough, salads, bread from Starter Bakery, two desserts, and natural wine and beer. The kitchen is small and the oven has a capacity of 6 pizzas.

The owners plan to expand the pizzeria to San Francisco. In January 2025 they will also open Cafe Brusco at 2000 University Avenue; it is to serve sandwiches, pastries, and coffee from Counter Culture Coffee during the day and be a wine bar in the evenings.

== Reception ==
In the restaurant's first month of operation, a writer for the East Bay Express called the Caesar salad "my favorite salad of 2021". In 2023, the San Francisco Chronicle listed Rose Pizzeria as one of 24 top pizza restaurants in the East Bay; earlier that year a restaurant critic for the Chronicle called the pizza "top-notch".

Rose Pizzeria was included in The New York Times's 2024 list of the 22 best pizzerias in the U.S., according to which "The toppings aren't flashy, but options ... are deeply delicious." The only other California pizzeria listed was Pizzeria Sei in Los Angeles.
