= Cesar Chavez Park =

Cesar Chavez Park may refer to:

- César Chávez Park, in Berkeley, California
- César Chávez Park, in Long Beach, California
- Cesar Chavez Plaza, in Sacramento, California
