= Berkeley Pier =

Pier in Berkeley, California, U.S.

Coordinates: 37.86283°N 122.3176°W

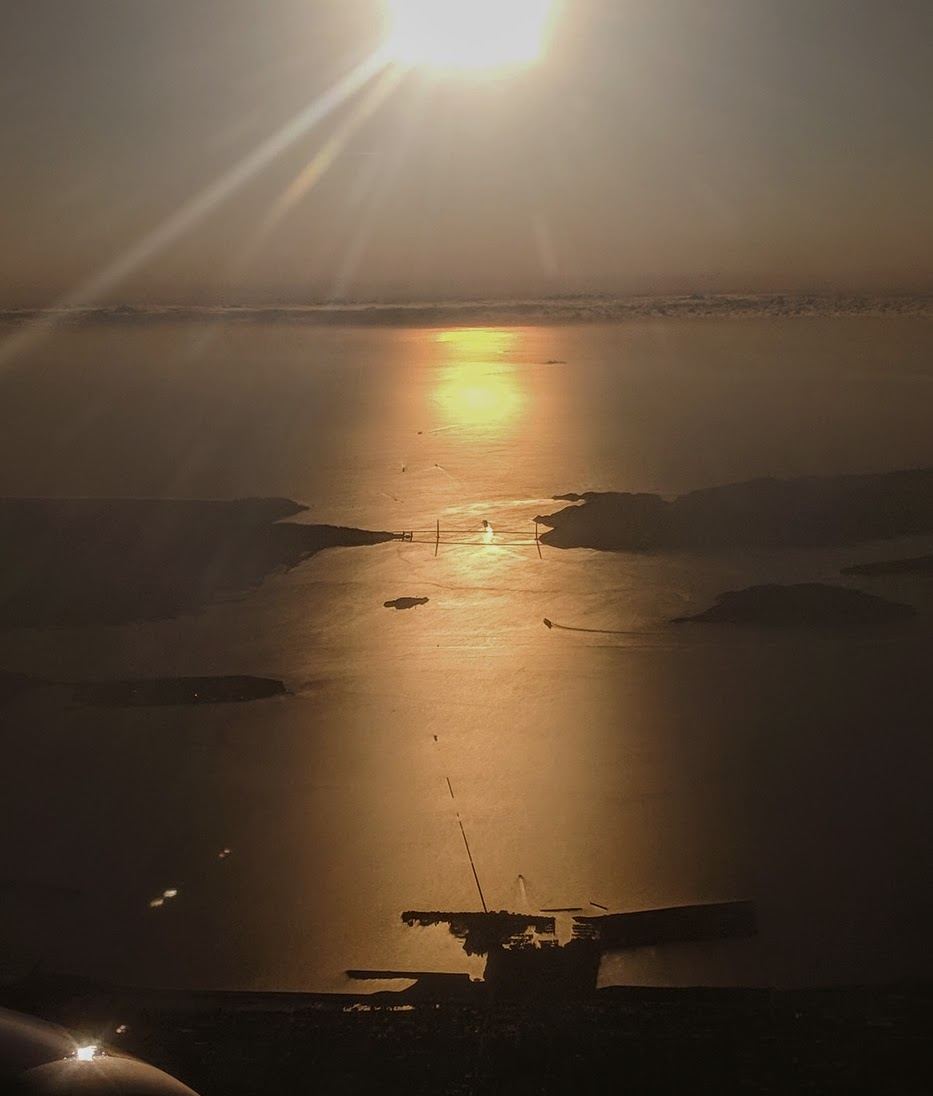
Late afternoon aerial view of the Golden Gate Bridge, looking west into the sun, with the Berkeley Pier in the foreground

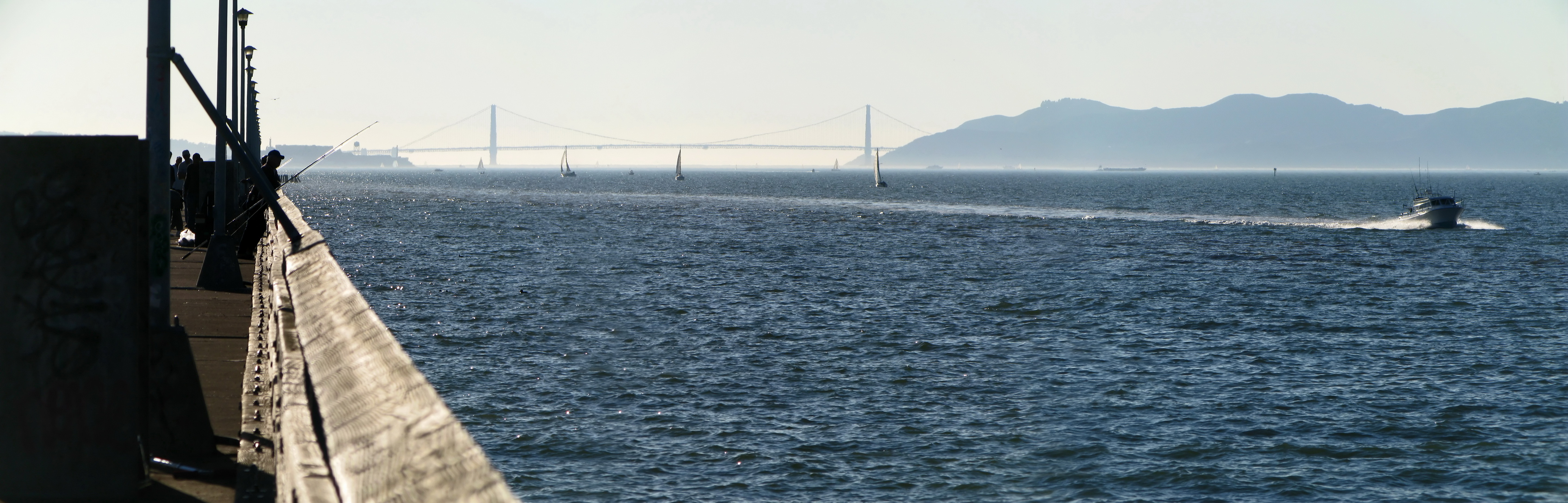
Fishing and crabbing were popular activities on the pier prior to its closing July 2015

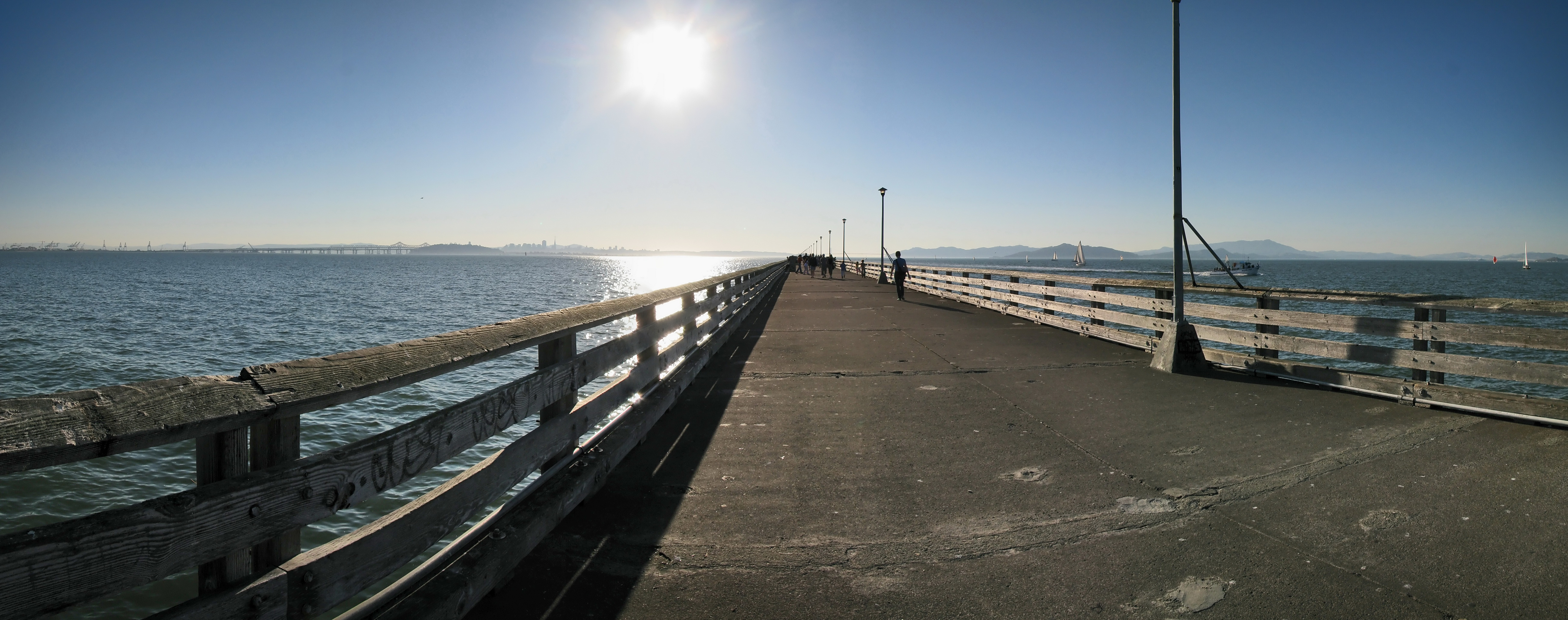
View from the deck of the pier westward

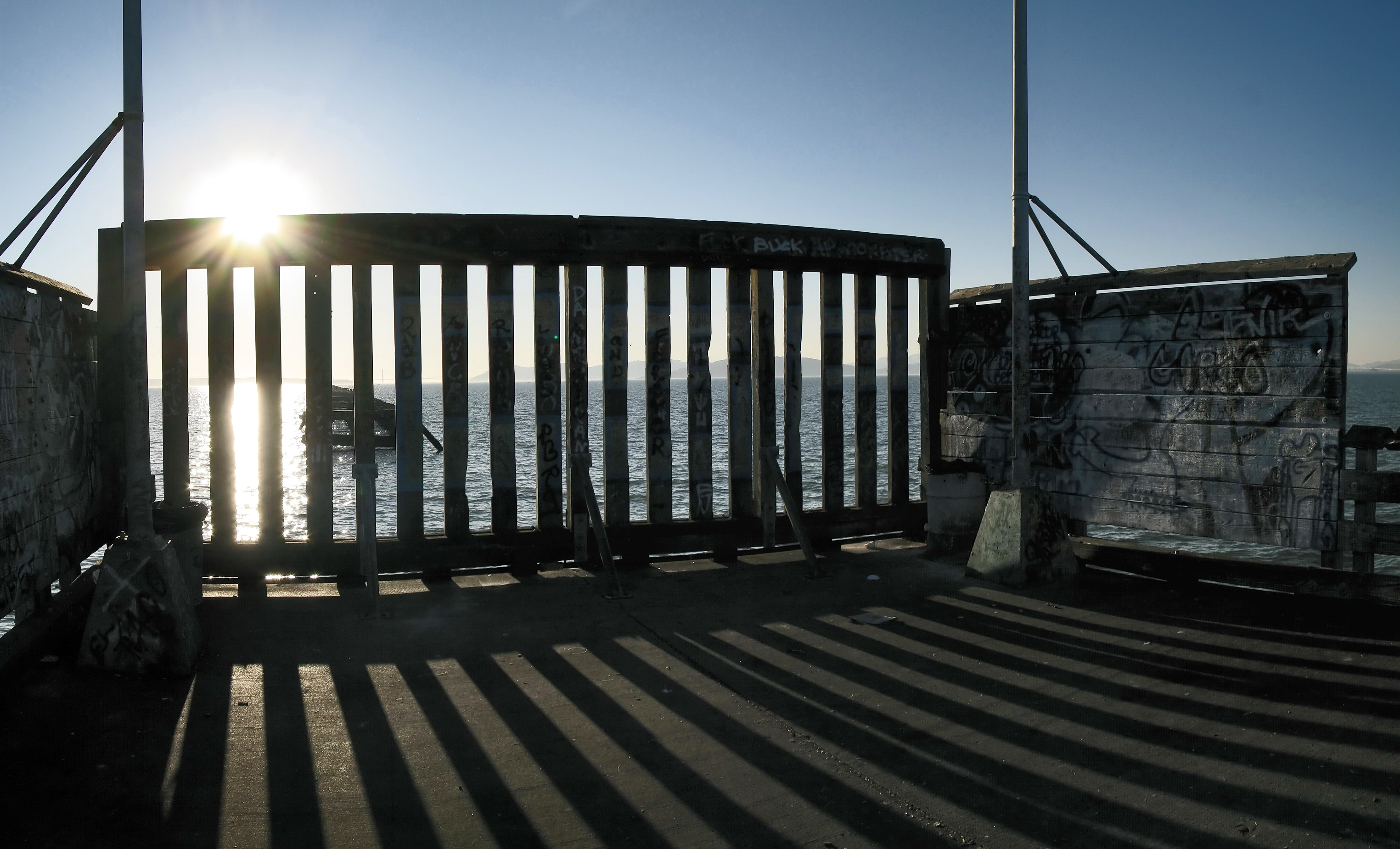
The barrier at the end of the pier. The old defunct pier section is visible through the barrier.

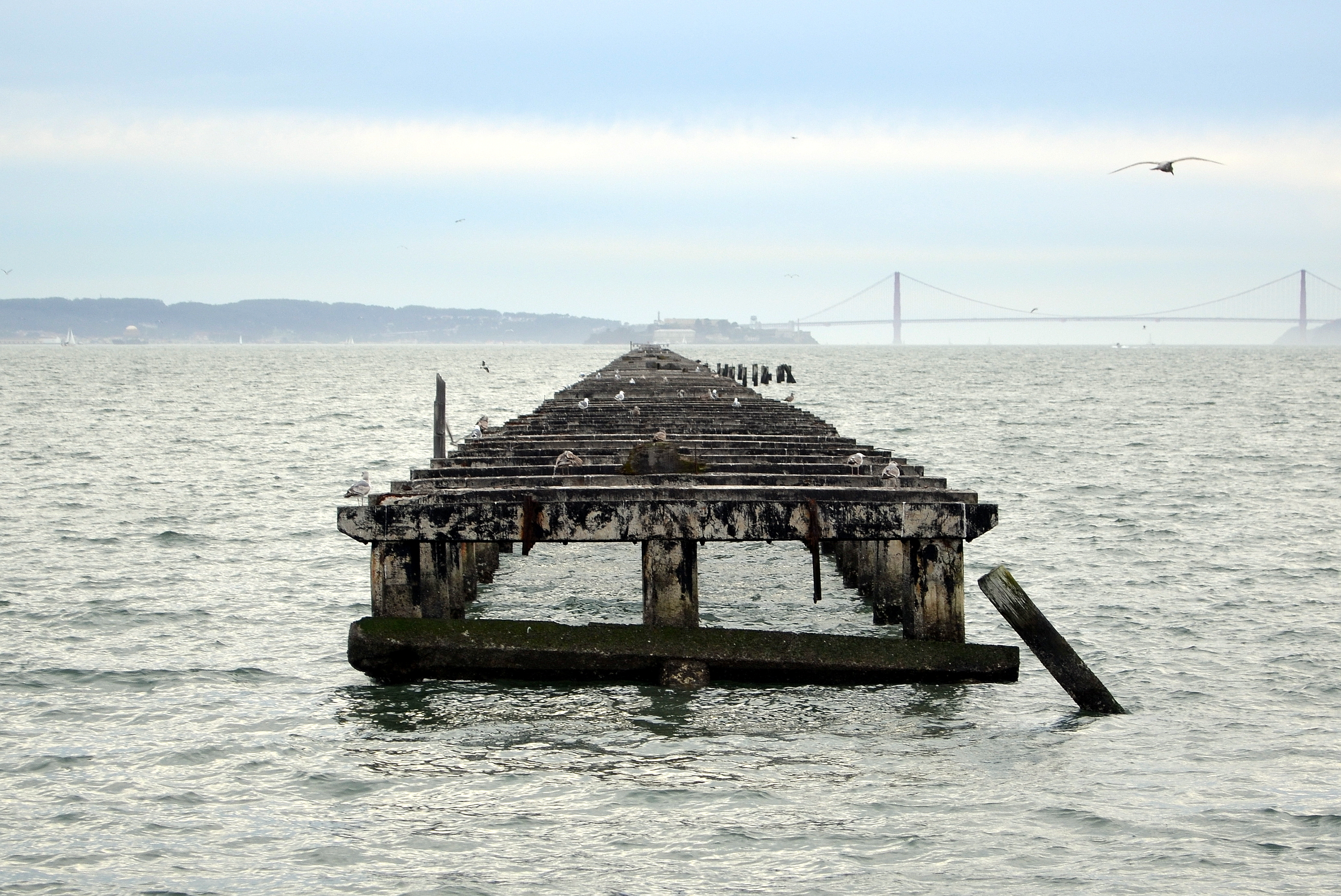
View of the defunct, inaccessible section from the barrier

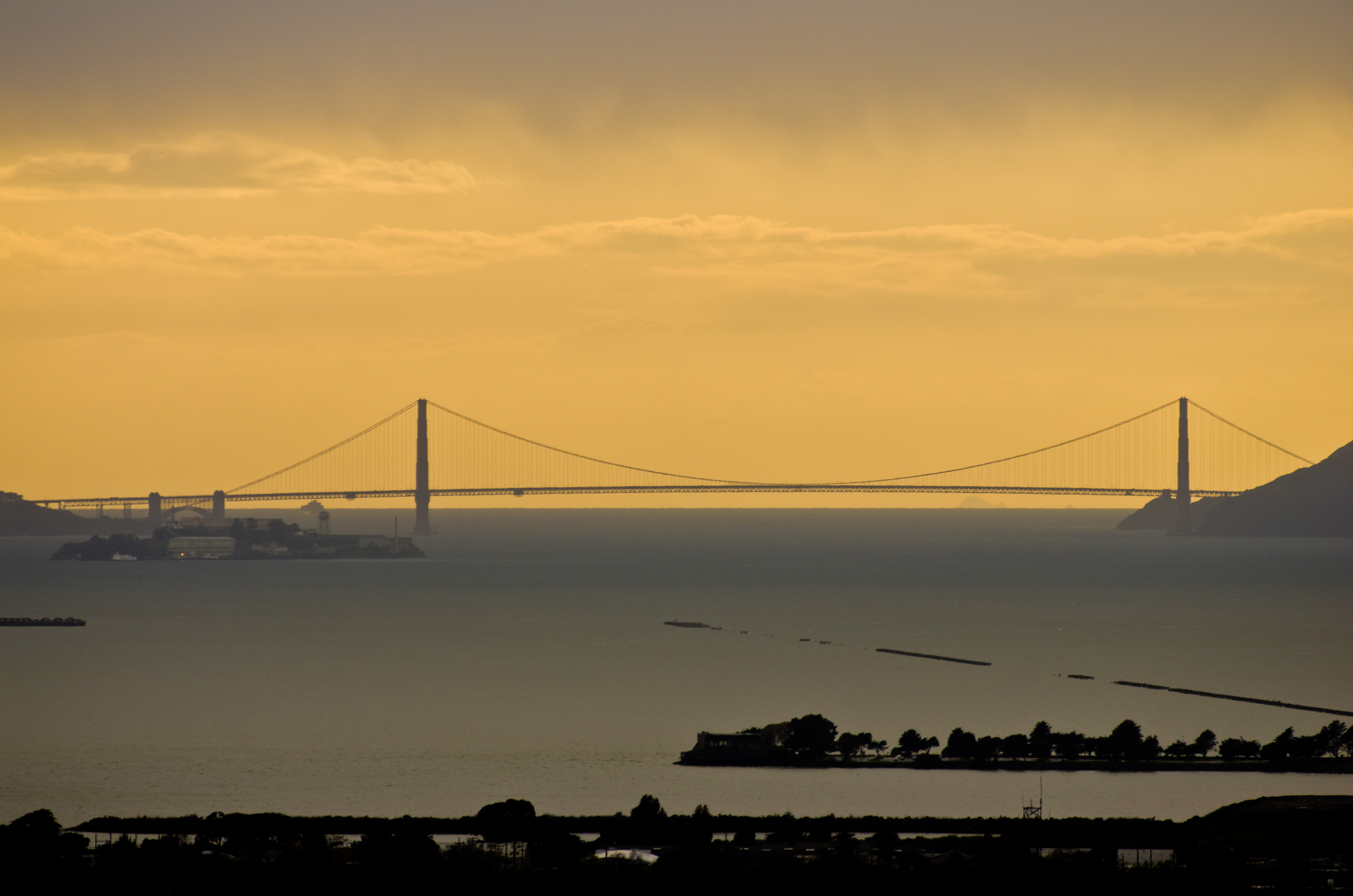
Remnants of the original length of the Berkeley Pier

The Berkeley Pier is in Berkeley, California. When constructed in 1926, the pier extended 3.5 miles (5.6 km) into San Francisco Bay from the end of University Avenue. Due to extensive filling of the bay and the creation of the Berkeley Marina, it presently extends only 2.5 miles (4.0 km). Since 1937, only the first 3,000 feet (910 m) were maintained and open to the public until July 2015, when public access was closed due to safety concerns.

== History ==
In the mid-19th century, two private wharves were built along the Berkeley waterfront. One was located at the foot of Addison Street one block south of University Avenue and served the Standard Soap Company, a major regional soap-making factory. The other, the Jacobs and Heywood Wharf, was located several blocks north of University Avenue at the foot of Delaware Street, used as a general freight transshipment point.

In 1909, the City built a municipal wharf at the foot of University Avenue. This pier was intended for a commuter ferry which never materialized, and the pier was instead used mainly for freight.

In 1925, the Golden Gate Ferry Company announced its plans to build a new ferry pier for its proposed automobile ferry service between Berkeley and San Francisco. The City of Berkeley agreed to a 50-year lease of the tidelands off the Berkeley waterfront for the construction of a new ferry pier.

On January 25, 1926, the Golden Gate Ferry Company applied to the California State Railroad Commission (predecessor of the California Public Utilities Commission) for a certificate permitting it operate a ferry service between Berkeley and San Francisco.

On July 7, 1926, the Golden Gate Ferry Company applied to the California State Railroad Commission for a certificate permitting it operate vessels on San Francisco Bay between Berkeley and San Francisco. The permit was granted.

In 1926, the Golden Gate Ferry Company began construction of the Berkeley Pier. It was built out from the foot of University Avenue, extending about 3.5 miles (5.6 km) into the Bay (measured from the original shoreline). The length was determined by the distance to deeper water. Nearly the entire length of the pier was paved as a two-lane road. At its end, the pier widened to accommodate vehicles waiting for a ferry. Two ferry docks were constructed.

On June 16, 1927, auto ferry service began between the Berkeley Pier and the Hyde Street Pier in San Francisco, a pier shared with the Sausalito ferry.

In December 1928, the Golden Gate Ferry Company and the competing auto ferry system of the Southern Pacific railroad decided to merge. They petitioned for the approval of the Railroad Commission. With the approval in hand, the new Southern Pacific-Golden Gate Ferries Ltd. was incorporated on February 18, 1929. On May 1, 1929, ferry service to San Francisco from the Berkeley Pier was taken over by the new company.

At the beginning of service, before the merger with SP, four specially-built diesel ferry boats ran every 15 minutes between Berkeley and San Francisco via the pier: The Golden Bear, the Golden Poppy, the Golden State, and the Golden Dawn, all painted yellow. Upon merging with the SP, the boats were all re-painted in the standard Southern Pacific maritime white.

In August 1928, radio station KTAB, associated with the Pickwick Broadcasting Corporation, began construction of its broadcasting facilities including a large antenna tower at the pier.

From its opening in 1927 to 1937, the Pier served as an integral part of the Lincoln Highway (the first road across America), and then subsequently U.S. Route 40.

The ferry line shut down on October 16, 1937, 11 months after the Bay Bridge opened to auto traffic.

Upon the cessation of ferry service, the portion of the pier closest to shore was converted to recreational use, mainly fishing. The remaining portion of the pier was left to decay, and is still visible, but inaccessible due to a barrier. There is a gap of about fifty feet at the end of the current pier to allow the passage of small boats. In 2007, proposals were considered to start a new ferry service using a terminal near the pier.

In 2015, deterioration of the pier prompted its entrance to be fenced off.

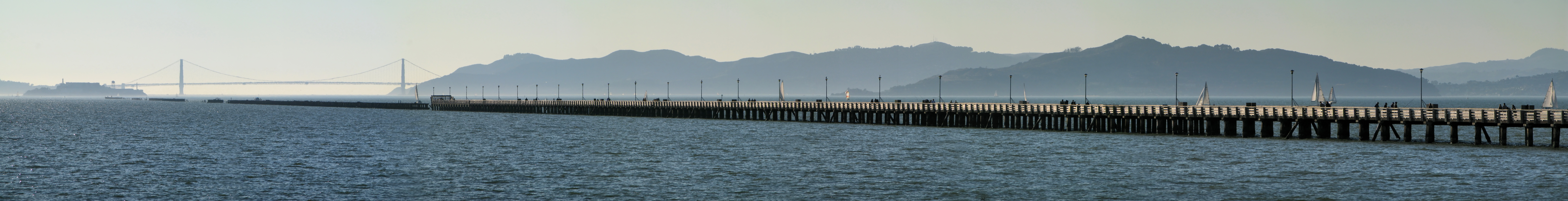
The gap between active and abandoned sections of the Berkeley Pier, viewed from the shoreline

== See also ==
- Ferries of San Francisco Bay
