= Aquatic Park =

Aquatic Park may refer to:

- Water park - an amusement park with water
- Aquatic Park (Berkeley) in Berkeley, California, United States
- Aquatic Park Historic District in San Francisco, California, United States
- Aquatic Park (Toronto) in Toronto, Canada
