= Urban Adamah =

Jewish farm and education center

Coordinates: 37.88186°N 122.30167°W

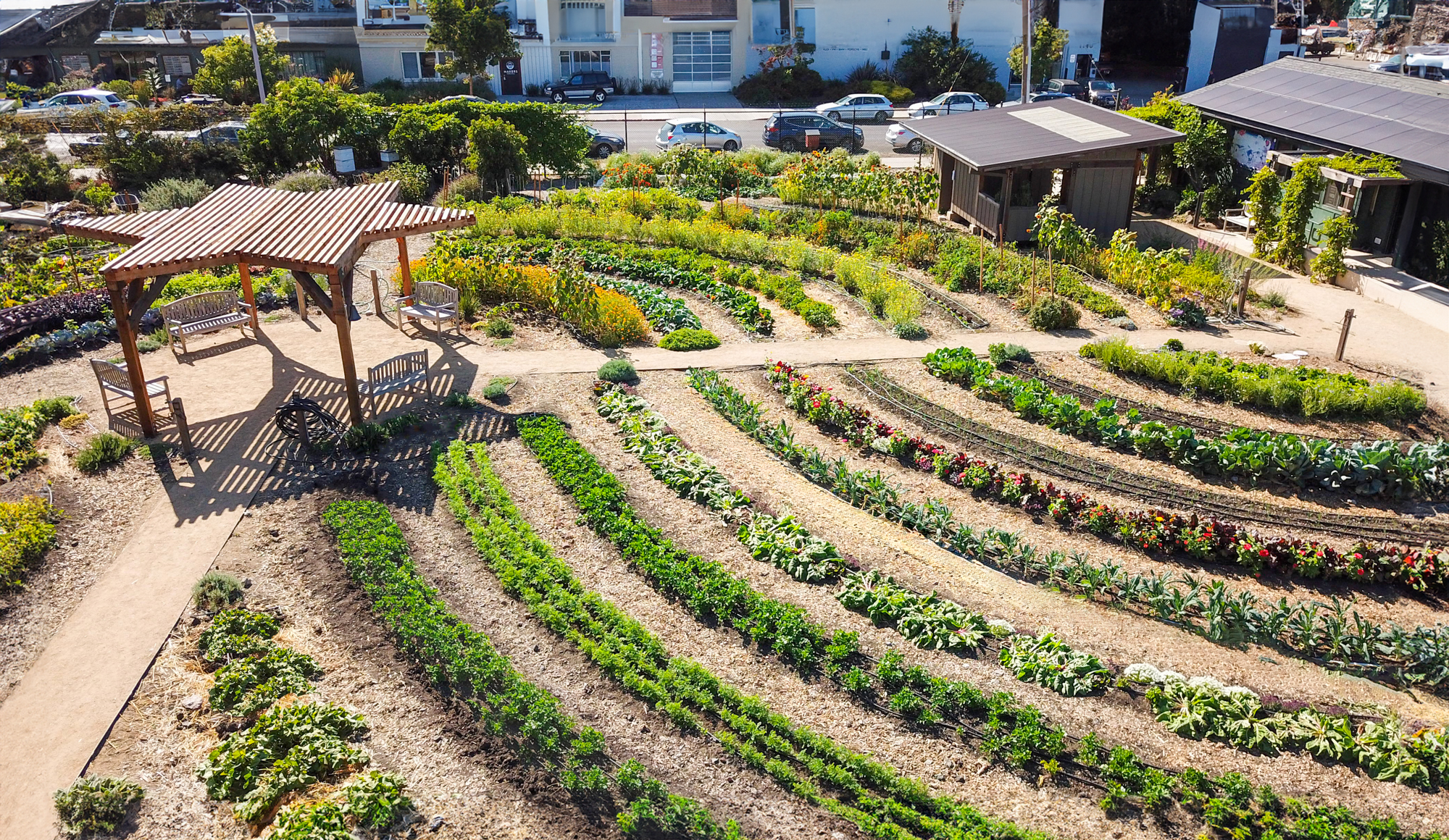
Main garden area

Urban Adamah is a 2.2-acre (0.89 ha) not-for-profit Jewish farm and education center in Berkeley, California. It was established in 2010 and conducts a variety of agricultural and religious programs. The majority of the food grown at Urban Adamah is donated to local food banks and community organizations.

== History ==
Urban Adamah was founded by Adam Berman in 2010, with its initial farm opening in Berkeley in 2011. Its name means "city and earth". The organization was the first urban Jewish farm in North America. As of 2013, it was attracting approximately 10,000 visitors annually. Its original location was a 1.25-acre (0.51 ha) site in Berkeley, but moved to a 2.2-acre (0.89 ha) West Berkeley property in 2016, adjacent to Codornices Creek.

In 2014, Urban Adamah canceled a planned kosher slaughter workshop due to concerns about protests from animal rights advocates.

== Facility ==
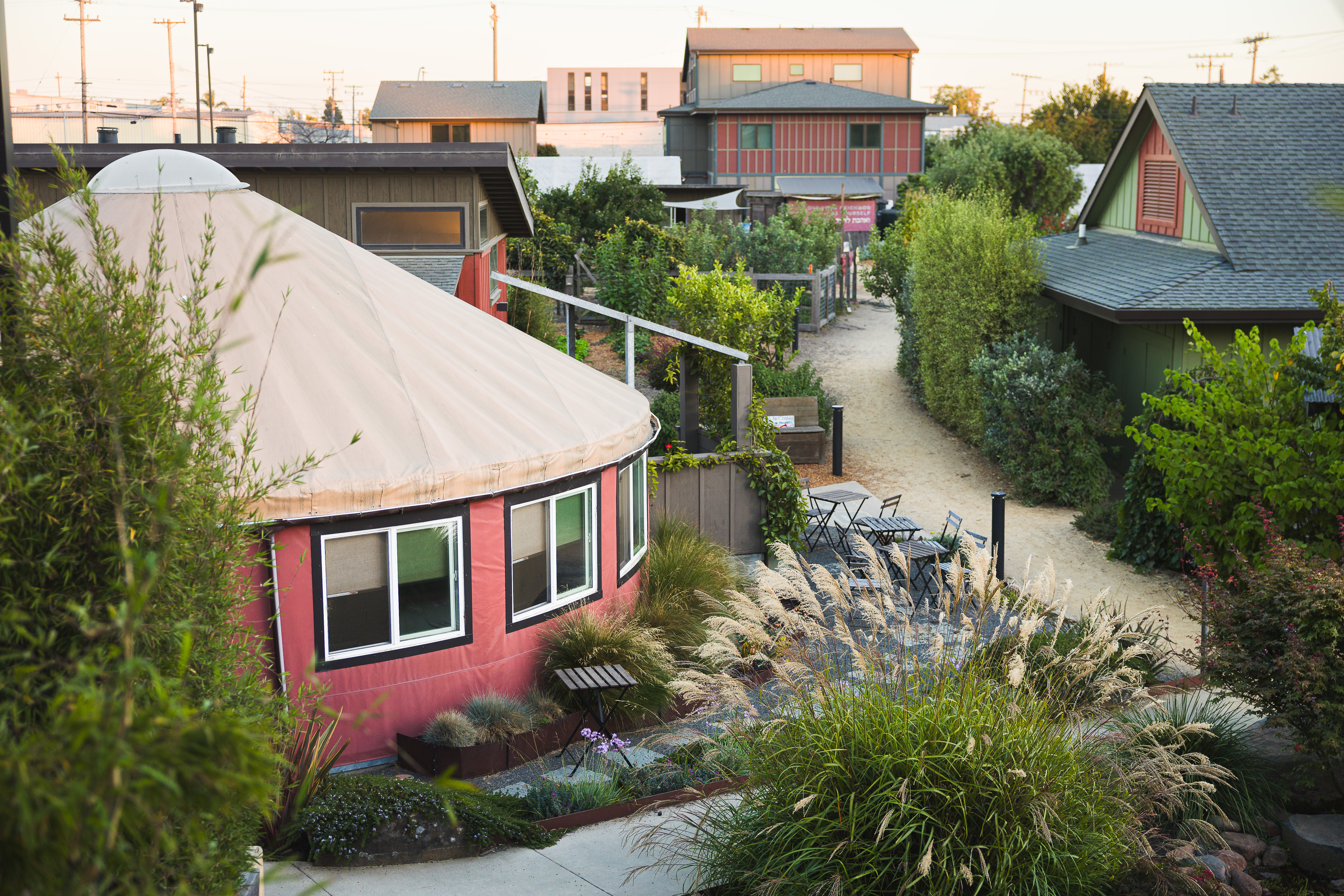
Buildings include a yurt, community hall, and barns

Urban Adamah's grounds in West Berkeley include facilities designed for farming, education, lodging, and community gatherings. The farm has fields, two greenhouses, a chicken coop, a goat pen, and an orchard containing 30 varieties of fruit trees. Crops being grown include rainbow chard, onions, radishes, turnips, carrots, broccoli, wheat, cabbage, and tomatoes. The campus contains a community hall, administrative offices, a kitchen, a barn, a retreat lodge, and a residential building.

== Programming ==
Urban Adamah provides hands-on educational programs that combine Jewish teachings with sustainable agriculture. In 2021, it started offering a residential fellowship program for adults aged 21 to 31, in which fellows live on the campus, learn farming techniques, and receive education on sustainability and Jewish practices. The program is held three times annually. In 2023, the farm launched the Summer Specialist residential program, for adults aged 19 to 22. Each year, Urban Adamah donates 90% of the yield from the farm, which is about 15,000 pounds of food, to local food banks and organizations, including the Berkeley Food Pantry, Berkeley Food Network, and LifeLong Medical Care. This amounts to about 30,000 meals per year.

The farm hosts additional events such as meditation retreats, summer camps for children, Shabbat gatherings for families, weddings, film festivals, and Talmud study sessions.
