= Berkeley I-80 bridge =

Pedestrian bridge in Berkeley, California

Coordinates: 37.86444°N 122.30318°W

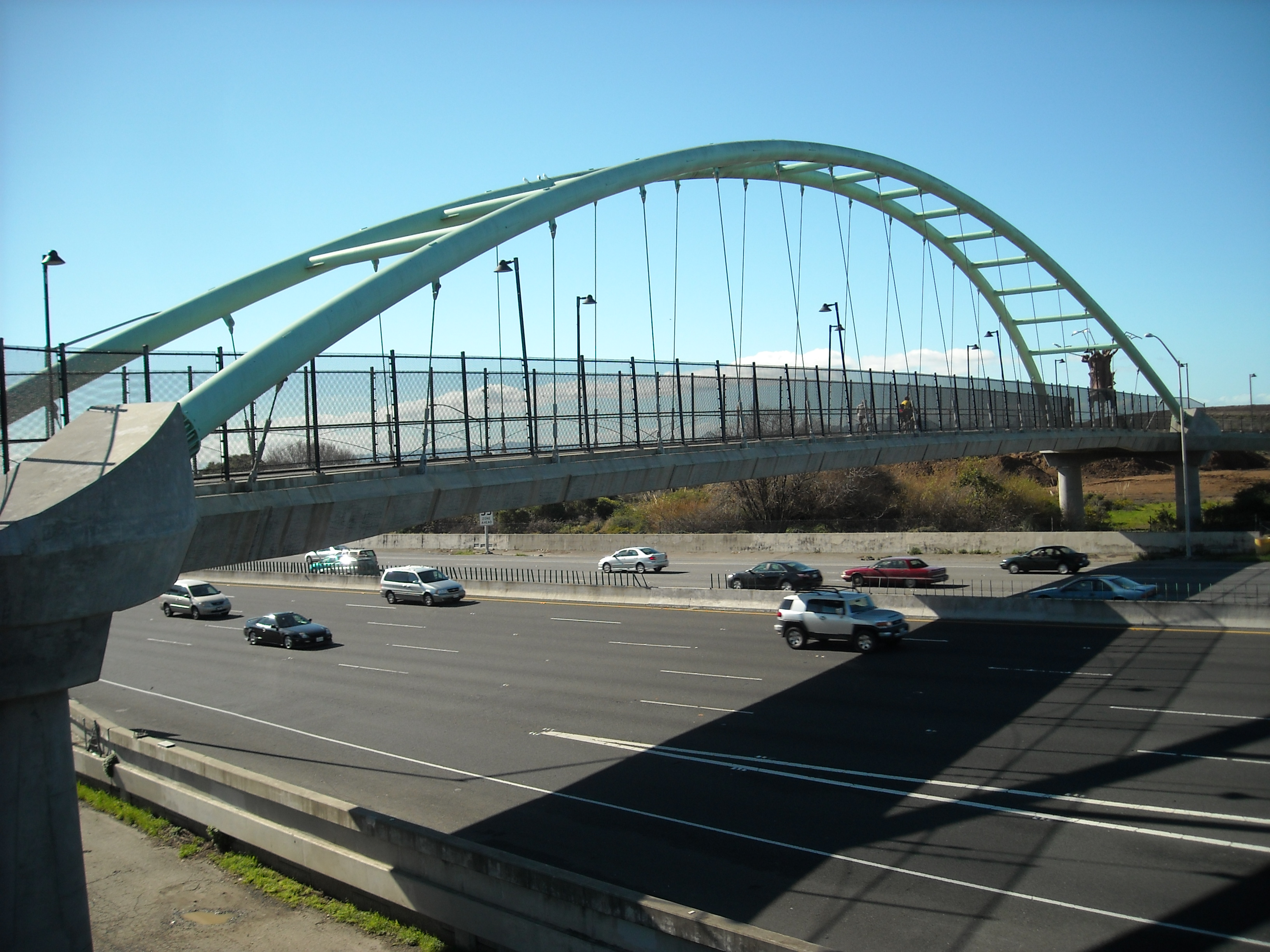
View of the bridge looking east

The Berkeley I-80 bridge also known as the University Avenue pedestrian bridge and the Berkeley Marina overpass is a 15-foot (4.6 m)-wide bridge spanning the Eastshore Freeway (Interstate 80/580) in Berkeley, California. It forms part of the San Francisco Bay Trail.

== History ==
The bridge was constructed to allow bicycles, pedestrians, and wheelchair users access to the Berkeley Marina, Eastshore State Park, and the city. In the city records, the bridge is referred to as the "City of Berkeley Eastshore Pedestrian Overcrossing". The bridge has two lanes for bikes and a raised sidewalk and is wide enough to carry emergency vehicles. Crossing 14 lanes of traffic, the main span is 85 metres (279 ft) long and the elevated approaches total 100 metres (330 ft) in length.

Opened on February 27, 2002, the bridge was built at a cost of $6.4 million. The new pathway created a route in compliance with the Americans with Disabilities Act of 1990 between Berkeley and its Marina and waterfront park region. Prior to its construction, the only wheelchair accessible route was via an undercrossing 1 mile (1.6 km) to the north. Bicycles and pedestrians alternately use a path and stairwell that ran under and along the University Avenue freeway overpass.

Since opening, the bridge has seen a much higher use than the previous path and stairwell. The National Bicycle Greenway has used it since 2003 in its Oakland to Berkeley Mayors' Ride.
