= Berkeley Marina =

- Neighborhood of Berkeley
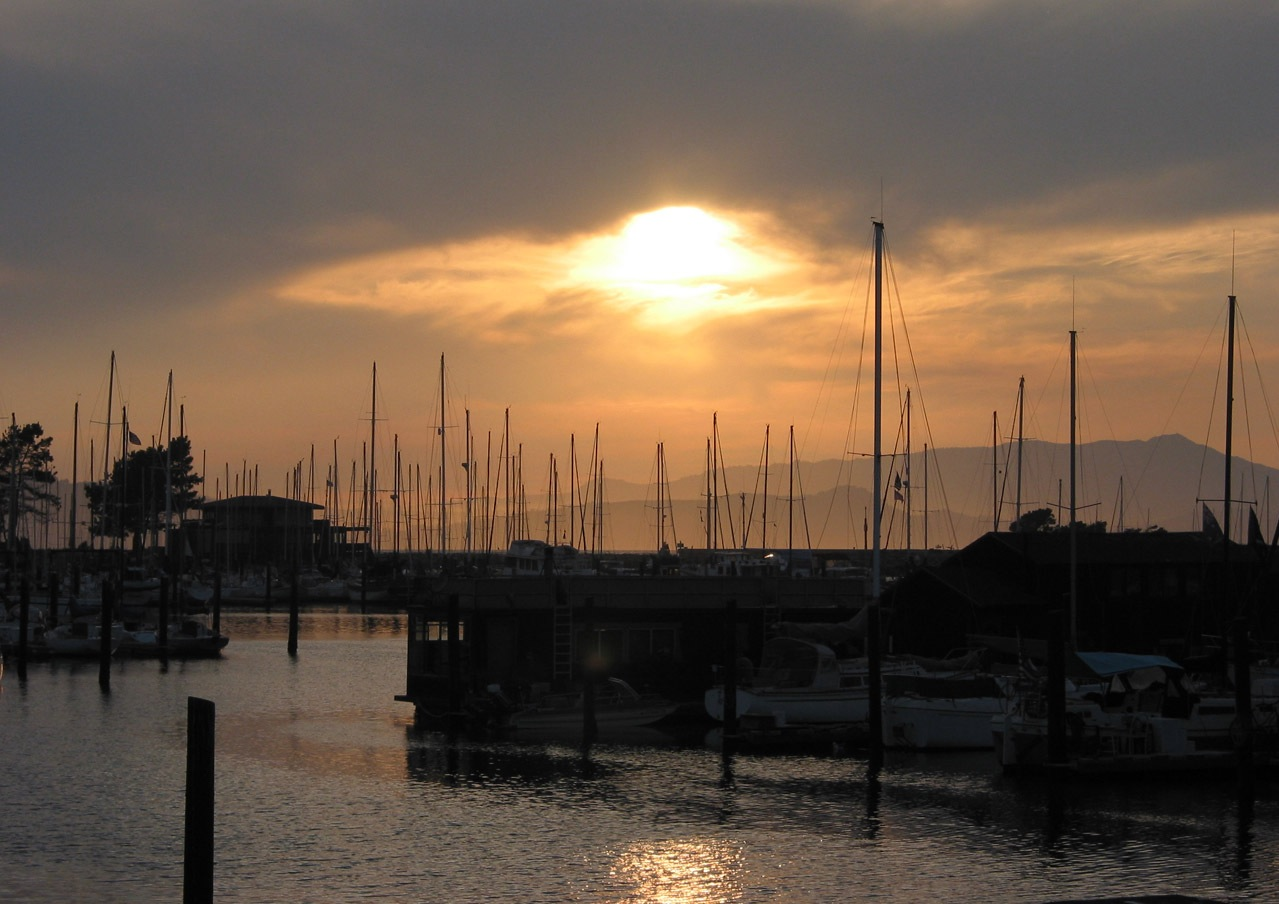
- The Berkeley Marina during sunset

- Location within Berkeley and the East Bay
- Coordinates: 37.86767°N 122.3125°W
- Country: United States
- State: California
- County: Alameda
- City: Berkeley

The Berkeley Marina is the westernmost portion of the city of Berkeley, California, located west of the Eastshore Freeway (Interstate 80 and 580) at the foot of University Avenue on San Francisco Bay. Narrowly speaking, "Berkeley Marina" refers only to the city marina, but in common usage, it applies more generally to the surrounding area. The Berkeley Marina is a hub for various water activities, offering opportunities for kayaking, stand-up paddleboarding, windsurfing, open-water swimming, and wingfoiling. Outdoor enthusiasts gather to enjoy the scenic bay, catch the wind for a sail, or practice their water sports skills.

There are several restaurants, a hotel and a yacht club in the Berkeley Marina. It is the home of the Cal Sailing Club and Cal Adventures. There are also several walking and bicycle paths. The area is accessible from the rest of Berkeley by foot or bike over the Berkeley I-80 Bridge at the foot of Addison Street (one block south of University Avenue), and is traversed near Interstate 80 by a segment of the San Francisco Bay Trail. In addition, it is the western terminus of AC Transit Route 51B (University Avenue-Rockridge BART) on select trips only.

The easternmost portion of the Marina, running parallel to I-80/580, is now a part of the Eastshore State Park.

== History ==
The Berkeley Marina was originally part of the open waters of San Francisco Bay. The original shoreline ran a few yards west of the Southern Pacific (now Union Pacific) tracks on Third Street. The area was gradually filled in over the years.

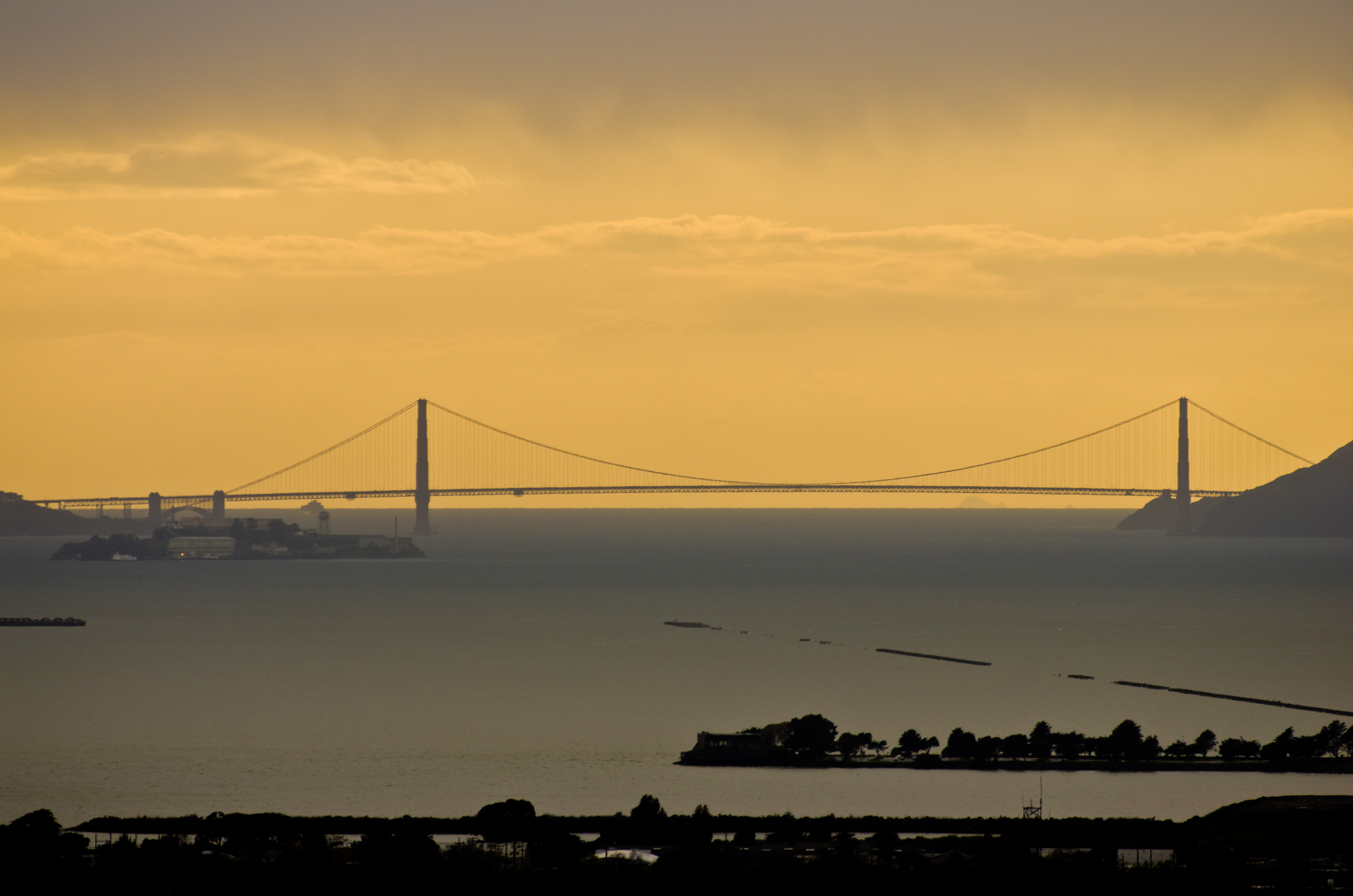
Remnants of the original length of the Berkeley Pier

In 1909, the City built a municipal wharf at the foot of University Avenue which was used primarily for freight. Starting in 1926, the Golden Gate Ferry Company began construction of the Berkeley Pier. It was built out from the foot of University Avenue about 3.5 miles (5.6 kilometers) into the Bay (measured from the original shoreline). On June 16, 1927, auto ferry service began. between the Berkeley Pier and the Hyde Street Pier in San Francisco, a pier shared with the Sausalito ferry. During this period US Route 40 ran from San Pablo Avenue down University Avenue to the Berkeley Pier. The ferry service lasted until about 1937, after the 1936 opening of the San Francisco–Oakland Bay Bridge. Thereafter it became a fishing pier. US 40 was shifted to the new Eastshore Highway and the Bay Bridge. Storms damaged the end of the pier over the years and it was closed. After World War II ended, it was repaired and re-opened in 1946 for fishing. In the 1970s, the city again repaired and upgraded the least damaged length of the Berkeley Pier, and it was in use until 2015 for fishing and viewing.

Since about the late 1920s, the city municipal dump was located here, and the accumulated garbage and construction debris accounts for most of the dry land of the Berkeley Marina. In the early 1990s much of the former dump was landscaped and converted into a park, originally named "North Waterfront Park". The park was renamed César Chávez Park in 1996 to commemorate the late California labor leader.

The actual Berkeley Marina, used by many people who sail on the Bay, was constructed as the Berkeley Yacht Harbor in the late 1930s by the Works Progress Administration in conjunction with its nearby work developing Aquatic Park. It was constructed just west of the West Berkeley Shellmound.

During World War II, the Berkeley Yacht Harbor was used by the United States Navy to construct tug boats.

=== Berkeley heliport ===
From October 1961 until April 5, 1974 a heliport was operated by San Francisco and Oakland Helicopter Airlines (known as SFO Helicopter Airlines) on the north side of University Avenue west of I-80 near the marina. This helicopter airline transported passengers to the San Francisco (SFO) and Oakland (OAK) international airports, and also at one point to downtown San Francisco. SFO Helicopter operated jet turbine powered Sikorsky S-61 and Sikorsky S-62 helicopters into the heliport which is no longer in existence.

=== Bay protection and recreational use ===
During the 1960s, Berkeley developed the marina with loans from the state’s Small Craft Harbor program; the marina was formally dedicated in 1966 and completed in the early 1970s. As opposition to further filling of San Francisco Bay grew, waterfront planning increasingly emphasized public access and recreation. BCDC’s initial San Francisco Bay Plan, approved in 1968, called for shoreline parks, beaches, fishing piers and pathways, particularly in urban areas."A People's History of Eastshore State Park". Bay Nature. Spring 2017.

A BCDC priority-use resolution adopted in 1971 lists the Berkeley Marina and nearby parks for recreational use."Resolution No. 16: Priority Use Area Designations and Boundary Descriptions". San Francisco Bay Conservation and Development Commission. A master site plan titled “Berkeley Regional Shoreline Recreation Area” depicted the marina as “Phase 1” and a northern “Marine Park” as “Phase 2”; it also marked a “35 Acre Parcel Acquisition.”"Exhibit C" (Map). Master Site Plan: Berkeley Regional Shoreline Recreation Area.

In 1986, Berkeley voters approved Measure L, the Public Parks and Open Space Preservation Ordinance, which protects city parks and public open space and requires voter approval for a change to non-recreational use. That year, the City adopted a Waterfront Master Plan establishing the waterfront as an area primarily for recreation, open space and environmental uses."Berkeley Marina Area Specific Plan: Worksession report" (PDF). City of Berkeley. February 16, 2021."Waterfront Master Plan". City of Berkeley.

=== Events and festivals ===
The Berkeley Bay Festival, held at the Berkeley Marina on San Francisco Bay, is a family-focused event that celebrates the Bay, and the people and organizations dedicated to its protection. Attendees can connect with the Bay and the local community through live music, performances, food, hands-on educational activities, and free boat rides.

=== Fishing at the Berkeley Marina ===
Prior to Berkeley Pier being closed, fishermen targeted sharks and rays year-round, as well as halibut from spring through summer and striped bass from spring through fall. They also caught smaller species, such as jacksmelt, pileperch, white seaperch, black perch, walleye surfperch, kingfish (white croaker), sand sole, and starry flounder.

Fishing boats still use Berkeley Marina, and charter boats targeting halibut, striped bass, salmon, lingcod, rock cod, and Dungeness crab are available for fishermen to rent.

== Environmental impacts ==
=== Radioactive substance beneath the park ===
The construction of the Berkeley Marina through land reclamation and filling has had notable environmental consequences. The Berkeley Landfill, which now lies beneath César Chávez Park, operated between 1961 and 1983, accepting what was then considered non-hazardous waste. However, on January 18, 2024, the California Water Boards issued a letter requiring the City of Berkeley to conduct tests for potential radioactive substances that may exist within the landfill. According to the letter, these substances could originate from the aluminum extraction process from bauxite ore, which can result in heavy metal contamination. Additionally, Uranium-235, a byproduct of aluminum processing and the primary fuel used in nuclear reactors, was also mentioned as a potential concern.

Heavy metal pollution poses long-term environmental risks, as these substances are non-biodegradable and persist in ecosystems for extended periods. Plants and animals may accumulate these toxins, leading to contamination throughout the food chain. The potential presence of radioactive materials raises further concerns due to the long-lasting and severe effects of radiation. Historical nuclear disasters such as Fukushima and Chernobyl demonstrate the devastating environmental and health impacts of radioactive contamination, which can persist for thousands of years, affecting soil, water, and surrounding ecosystems.

== See also ==
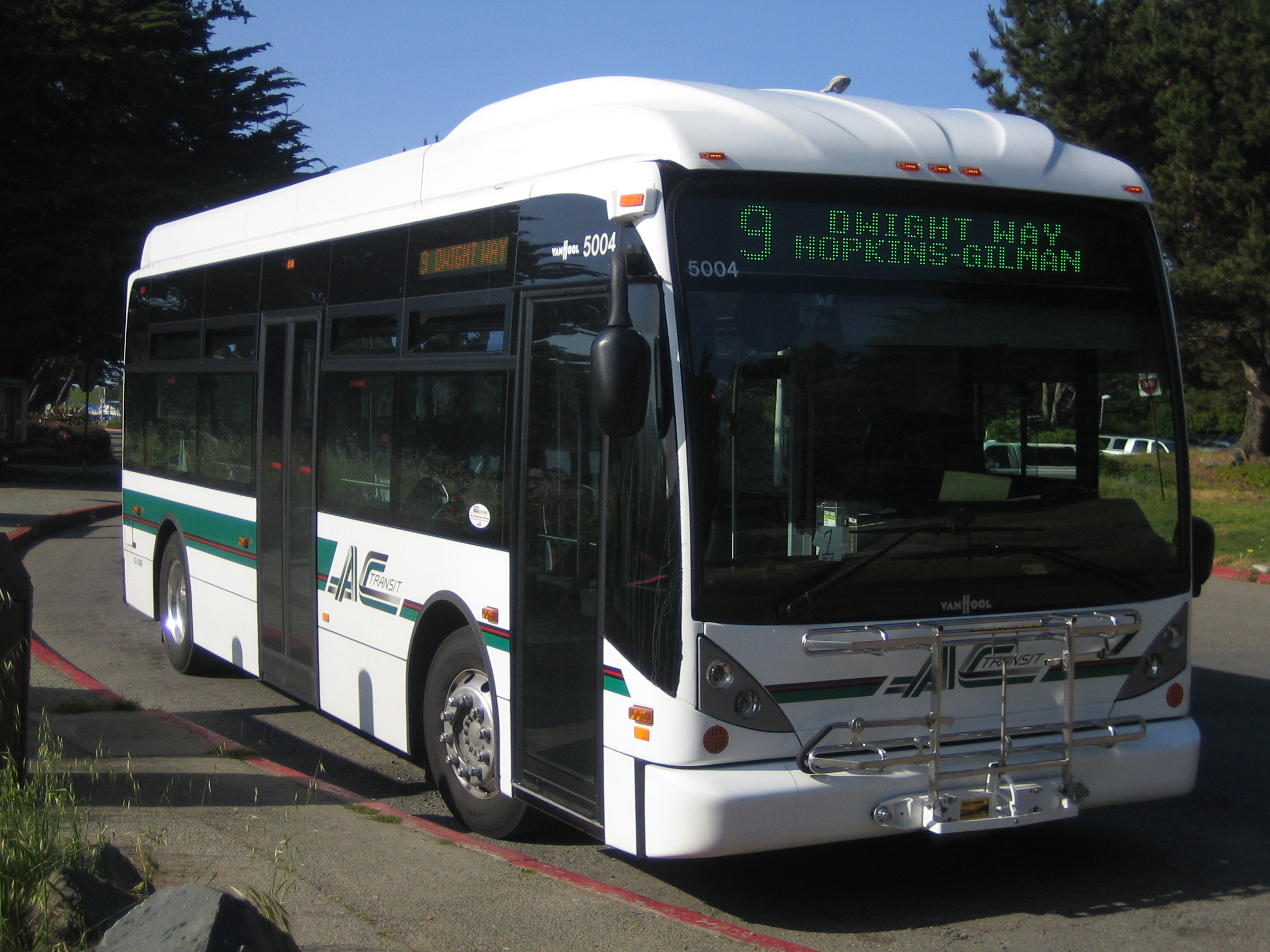
An AC Transit bus at its terminus of old route 9 at the Marina

- Berkeley Pier
- César Chávez Park
- OCSC Sailing
- Adventure Playground (Berkeley)
- Berkeley Marina California
- Fishing Regulations

== Bibliography ==
- Berkeley, California: the story of the evolution of a hamlet into a city of culture and commerce by William Warren Ferrier, Imprint Berkeley, Calif. (1933); pp. 375–6
- Berkeley: The Town and the Gown of It, by George Pettitt, Howell-North Books, Berkeley (1973)
- Berkeley: The First Seventy-Five Years, Federal Writers Project (1941), p. 140
