= Golden Gate Ferry Company =

Private company in California

Golden Gate Ferry Company was a private company which operated automobile ferries between San Francisco, Berkeley and Sausalito before the opening of the Bay Bridge and the Golden Gate Bridge. The company was incorporated in November 1920. In early 1929, the Golden Gate Ferry Company merged with the ferry system of the Southern Pacific railroad, becoming the Southern Pacific-Golden Gate Ferries, Ltd. The auto ferries were discontinued soon after the Golden Gate and Bay Bridges were opened.

== Sausalito ferry ==
Steam trains at Sausalito Terminal, photo dated May 1891

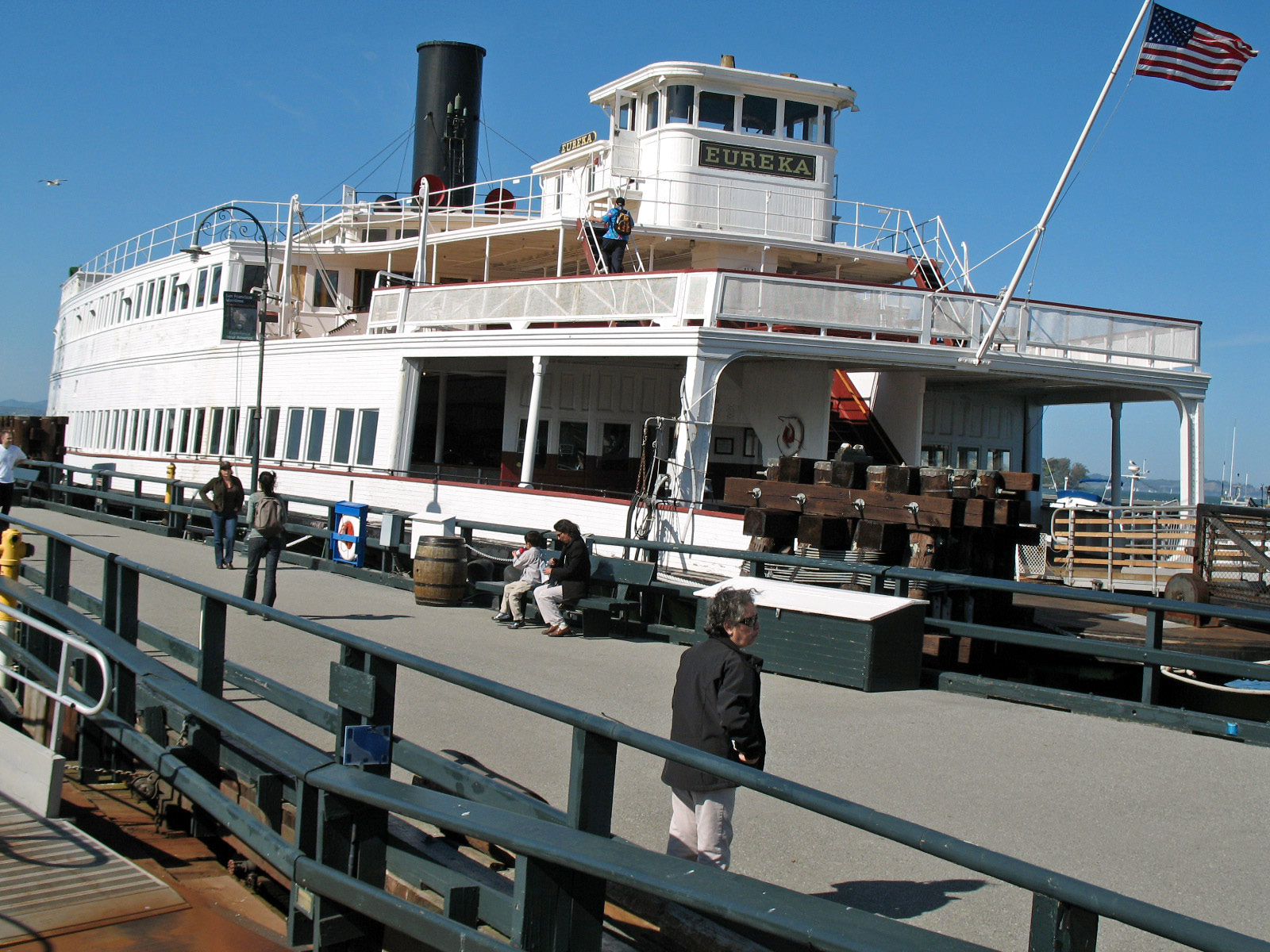
The Eureka, then the largest double-ended ferryboat in the world, carried passenger and automobile traffic on the Sausalito–San Francisco run from 1922 to 1941. (Pictured in San Francisco in 2008)

The Madden and Lewis Company owned the Sausalito side of the Golden Gate Ferry Company that ran before the completion of the Golden Gate Bridge, the ferry was run by the North Pacific Coast Railroad. The site of the Sausalito side of the Golden Gate Ferry Company became the Sausalito Yacht Club and the current Sausalito Ferry Terminal of the Sausalito Ferry run by the Golden Gate Ferry that began service in 1970. Sausalito Ferry Terminal The station is served by Golden Gate Ferry and Blue & Gold Fleet ferries and the Golden Gate Transit and Marin Transit bus routes. In 1868 Sausalito Land and Ferry Company began running ferries between Sausalito and San Francisco. which purchased the service in 1875. Pedestrian ferries service ended on February 28, 1941 and car ferry service stopped in March.

== Berkeley ferry ==
In 1926, the Golden Gate Ferry Company began construction of the Berkeley Pier. It was built out from the foot of University Avenue, extending about 3.5 miles (5.6 km) into the Bay (measured from the original shoreline). On June 16, 1927, auto ferry service began between the Berkeley Pier and the Hyde Street Pier in San Francisco, a pier shared with the Sausalito ferry. At the beginning of service, before the merger with SP, four specially-built diesel ferry boats ran every 15 minutes between Berkeley and San Francisco via the pier: The Golden Bear, the Golden Poppy, the Golden State, and the Golden Dawn, all painted yellow. Over the years, other ferries owned by the company were occasionally employed. Upon merging with the Southern Pacific railroad, the boats were all re-painted in the standard Southern Pacific maritime white.

Between 1926 and 1937, the Pier served as an integral part of the Lincoln Highway (the first road across America), and then subsequently U.S. Route 40. A two-lane road ran the entire length to a ferry dock at the end of the pier. The ferry line shut down on October 16, 1937, 11 months after the Bay Bridge opened to auto traffic.

== Ferryboats ==
In 1938, the Golden Poppy was sent to Washington state where it was renamed MV Chetzemoka and continued in service until 1973. In 1977, it sank in heavy seas as it was being towed back to San Francisco Bay. The Golden State was also sent to Washington state and renamed Kehloken. It was in service until 1979 when it was burned in a fire that spread from the pier it was moored to. The Golden Bear was damaged off the coast of Oregon while being towed to Washington state in 1937 and subsequently salvaged for parts. The Golden Dawn was simply retired in 1937, presumably for scrap.

== See also ==
- Ferries of San Francisco Bay
