= Pizzeria Sei =

Restaurant in Los Angeles, California, U.S.

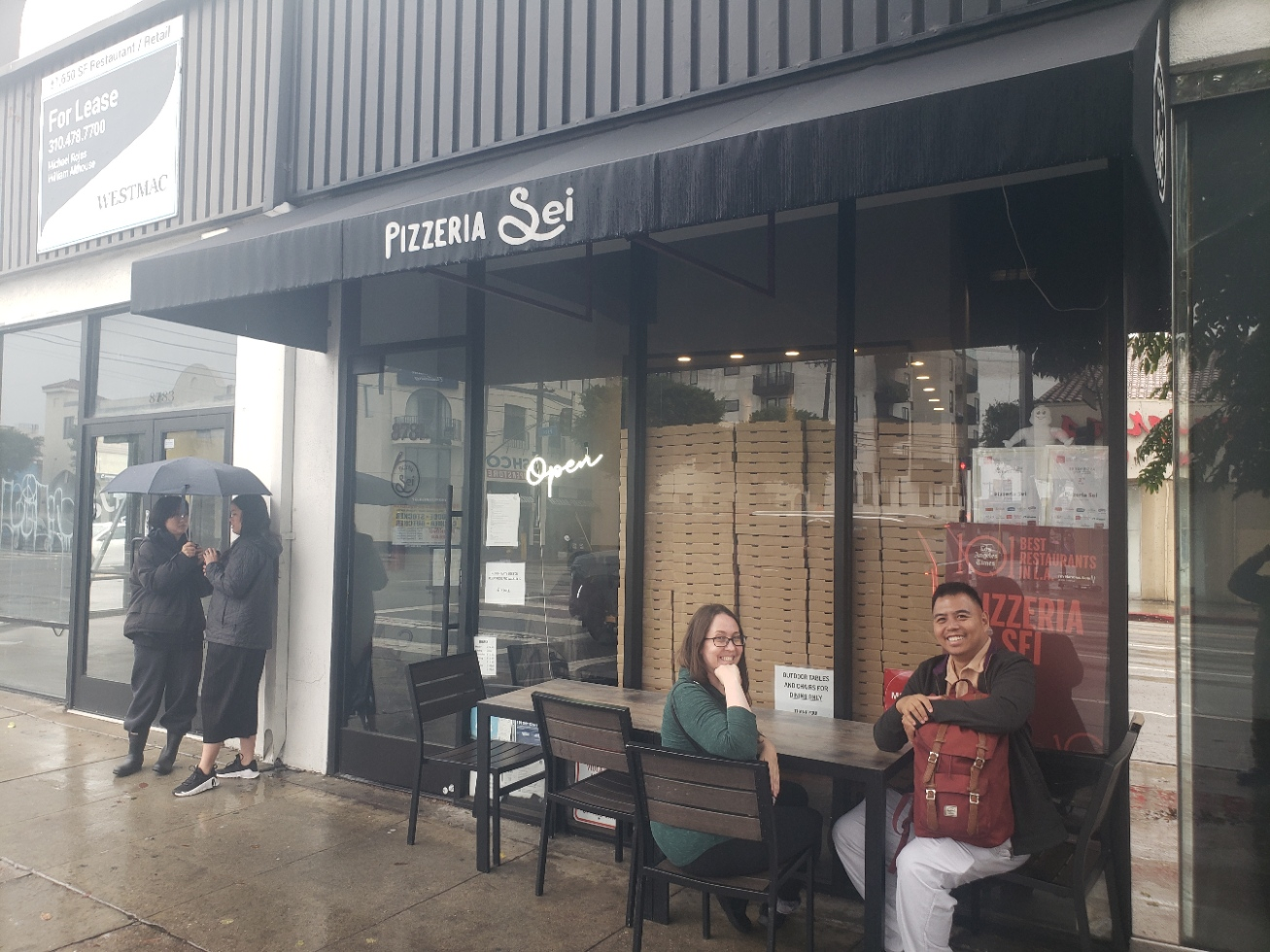
- Restaurant exterior
- Interactive map of Pizzeria Sei

Restaurant information
- Location: 8781 W. Pico Blvd., Los Angeles, California, 90035, United States
- Coordinates: 34°03′18″N 118°23′00″W

Pizzeria Sei is a restaurant in Los Angeles, California, United States. It was included in The New York Times's 2024 list of the 22 best pizzerias in the U.S.; the only other California pizzeria listed was Rose Pizzeria in Berkeley.
