= Eureka (ferryboat) =

Side-wheel paddle steamboat, built in 1890

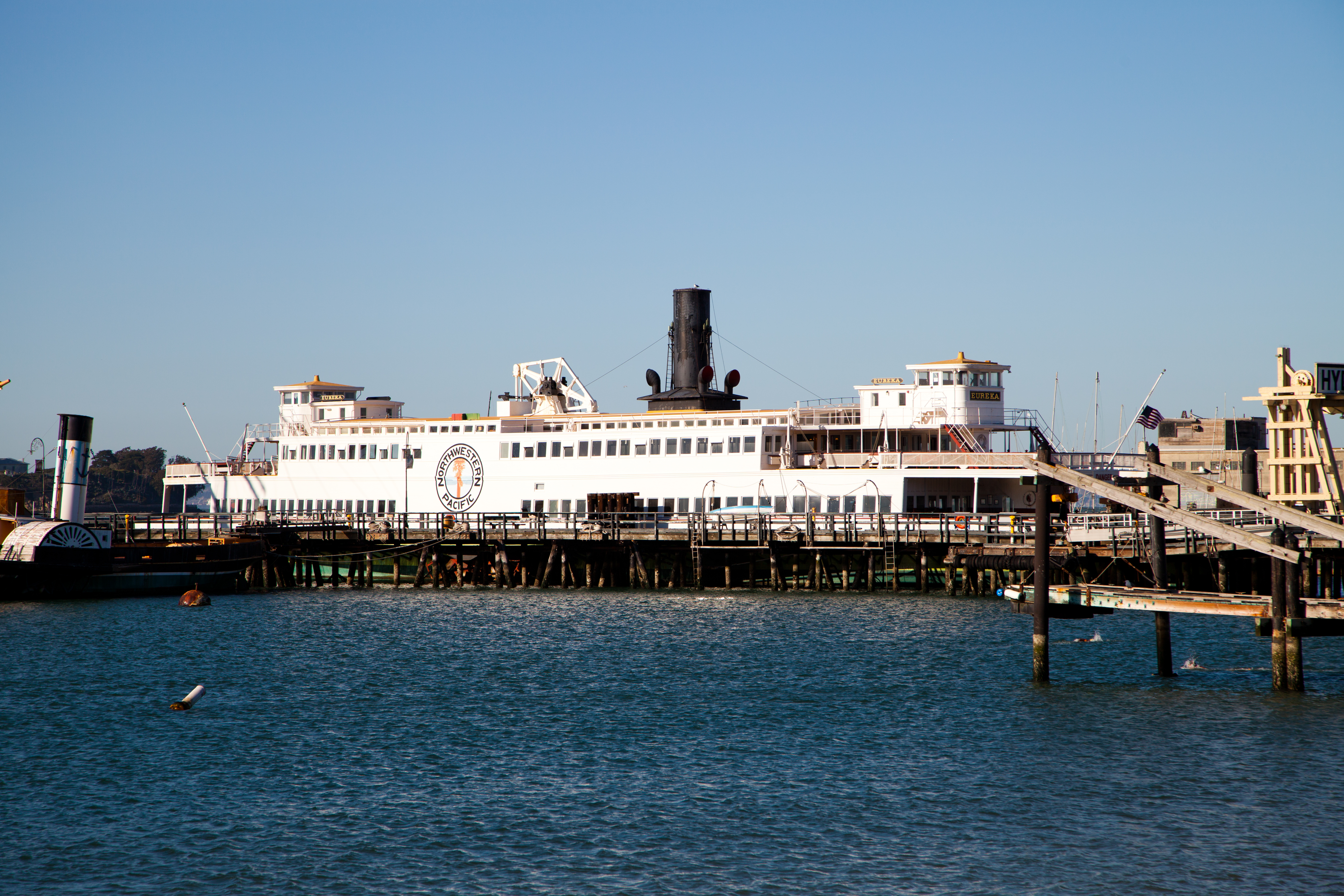
- Eureka docked at Hyde Street Pier, 2012

History

United States
- Name: Ukiah (1890–1922); Eureka (1922–present)
- Builder: San Francisco and North Pacific Railroad, Tiburon, California
- In service: 1890–1958
- Refit: 1920–22
- Status: Museum ship

General characteristics
- Type: Steamboat
- Tonnage: 2,420 GT
- Length: 299 ft 6 in (91.29 m) LOA
- Beam: 78 ft (24 m)
- Draft: 6 ft 6 in (1.98 m)
- Propulsion: 1 × 1,500 hp (1,119 kW) walking beam engine
- Capacity: Original: —500 passengers; —16 railroad cars; From 1922: —2,300 passengers; —120 automobiles
- Crew: 16
- Eureka (double-ended ferry)
- U.S. National Register of Historic Places
- U.S. National Historic Landmark
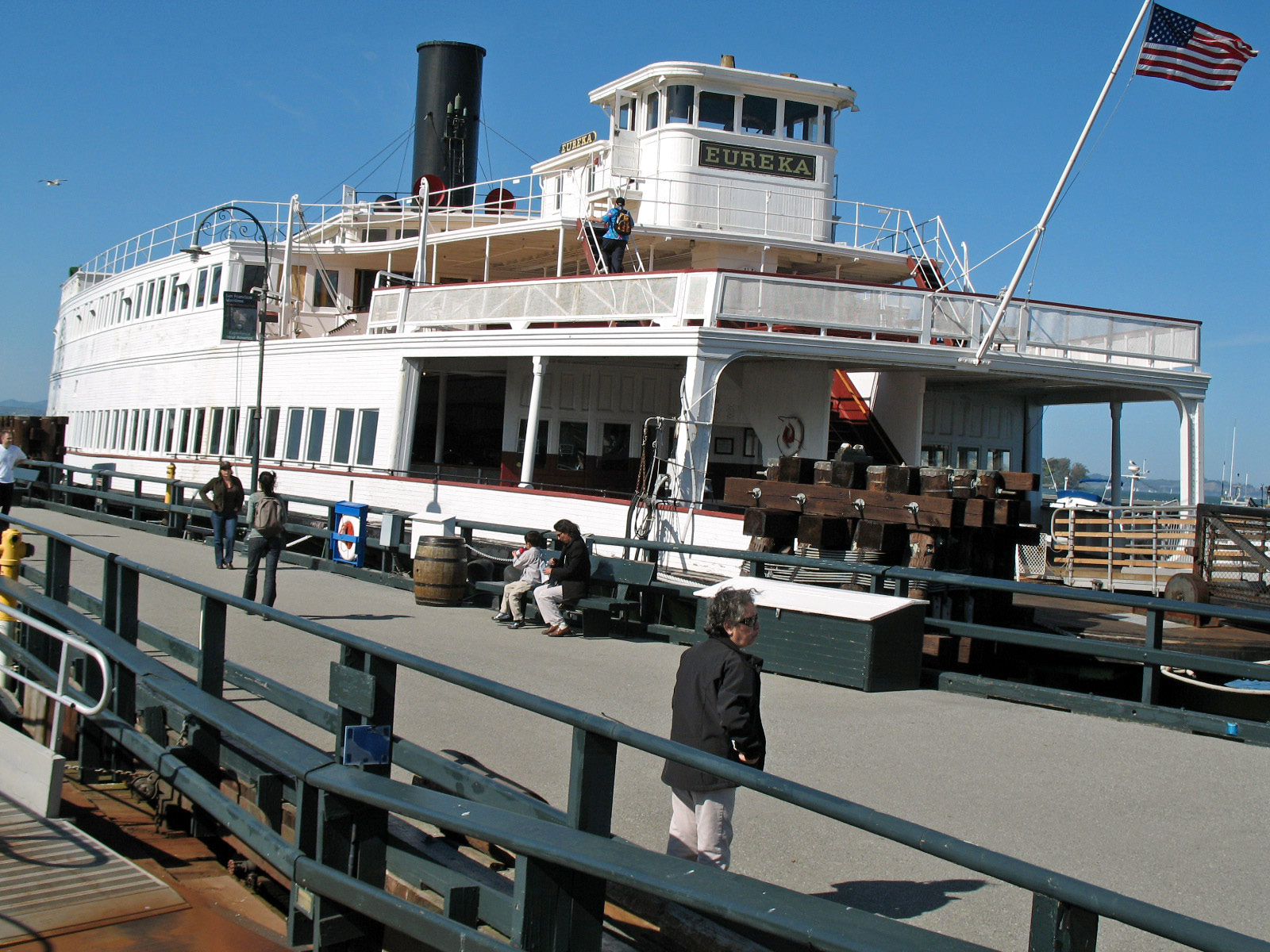
- View from port stern

- Location within California Location within the United States
- Location: San Francisco, California
- Coordinates: 37°48′35″N 122°25′18″W
- Built: 1890
- NRHP reference No.: 73000229

Significant dates
- Added to NRHP: April 24, 1973
- Designated NHL: February 4, 1985

Eureka is a side-wheel paddle steamboat, built in 1890, which is now preserved at the San Francisco Maritime National Historical Park in San Francisco, California. Originally named Ukiah to commemorate the railway's recent extension into the City of Ukiah, the boat was built by the San Francisco and North Pacific Railroad Company at their Tiburon yard. Eureka has been designated a National Historic Landmark and was listed in the National Register of Historic Places on April 24, 1973.

She is the largest existing wooden ship in the world.

== Construction and design ==
Ukiah, a wooden-hulled, double-ended ferryboat, was built in 1890 by the San Francisco and North Pacific Railroad Company at their Tiburon shipyard. She had a length at the waterline of 277 feet (84 m) (291 feet (89 m) overall), beam of 47 feet 7 inches (14.50 m)—78 feet (24 m) over guards—and hold depth of 15 feet (4.6 m). Her original gross tonnage was 2,564 and net tonnage, 2,018 tons. The ship had a crew of sixteen, whose quarters were in the hold.

According to the National Register of Historic Places, Ukiah was originally built with a main deck for railroad cars and a second deck for passengers above. Numerous contemporaneous newspaper reports, however, state that both the passenger accommodations and railroad cars were located on the main deck. A broad stairway led from this deck to the promenade deck above, where the fore and aft pilot houses, along with staterooms for the officers, were located. Rising from the promenade deck were also several smaller decks for sightseers, accessible only by ladder.

Two standard-gauge railway tracks, on which the railroad cars were transported, were installed the length of the main deck through the center of the ship. Passenger accommodations were located on either side, fore and aft of the paddleboxes, with one side of the ship reserved for female passengers and the other for males. The female side included a moveable partition around the paddlebox that allowed passengers to move between cabins in privacy; this partition could be folded up to make room for railroad cars when required. The passenger decorations on each side differed, with the men's featuring grained panelling, and the women's, "parti colors, with gilt moldings and beadings". Floors on the ladies' side featured velvet carpets, while oilcloths sufficed for the men. At each end of the passenger quarters were vestibules, fitted with doors to prevent drafts. Seats throughout were built of semi-circular strips of cedar and black walnut, separated by black walnut arms. The main deck also featured a bar—located near the engine—toilets and a restaurant. Joinery work throughout the vessel was by Robert Bragg.

Ukiah was powered by a single-cylinder 1,700 horsepower (1,300 kW) vertical beam steam engine with a bore of 65 inches (170 cm) and stroke of 12 feet (3.7 m), built by the Fulton Iron Works of San Francisco. The NRHP states that the ship was originally fitted with four direct flue return tube boilers; again, however, contemporaneous newspaper reports differ, stating that steam was originally supplied by two steel boilers; these had a length of 25 feet (7.6 m) and shell of 12 feet (3.7 m), and operated at a pressure of 60 psi (410 kPa). Ukiah's paddlewheels were 27 feet (8.2 m) in diameter, and each fitted with 24 buckets having a width of 12 feet (3.7 m).

The ship was launched in San Francisco Bay on Saturday, May 17, 1890, at 10:40 pm, witnessed by a crowd of about 800 people, many of whom had arrived by a special train from San Rafael.

== Service history ==
=== Early service ===
The ship originally carried people between San Francisco and Tiburon during the day and hauled railroad freight cars at night. On April 16, 1907, she sank at the foot of East Street, San Francisco due to errors in handling the off loading of railroad cars. She was later raised. In 1907, Ukiah was re-routed to the Sausalito–San Francisco Ferry Building route by its new owners, Northwestern Pacific Railroad.

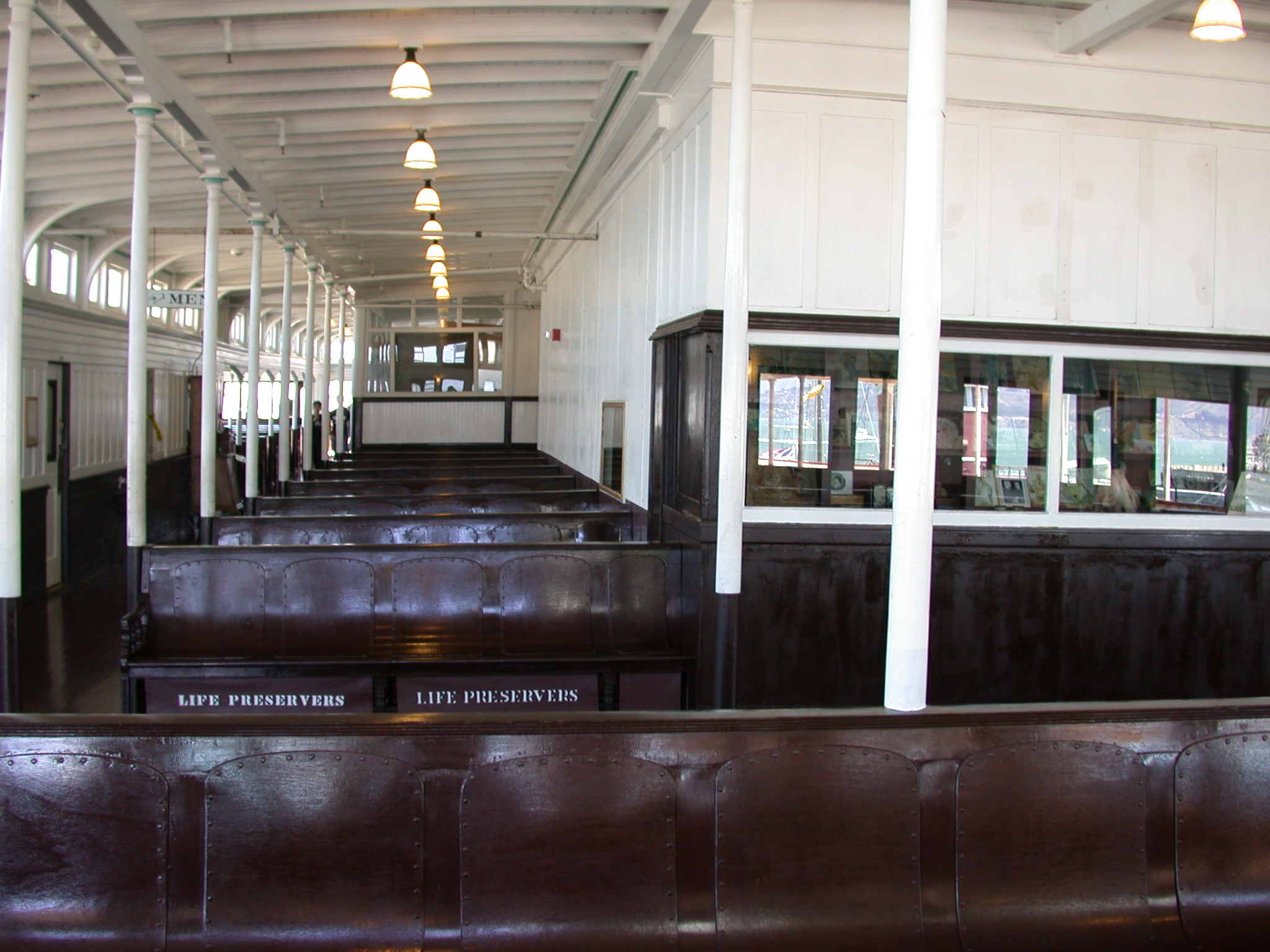
View of the seating area on Eureka's upper deck. The magazine shop is visible to the right behind the glass. The restaurant was on this level at the far end of the deck

As automobiles became more common, motorists wanted to "drive across the bay". Since there were no bridges on San Francisco Bay at the time, Ukiah was able to meet this demand via a refitted lower deck designed to handle vehicles. The deck above (also enclosed) was expanded for passengers.

=== World War I and subsequent rebuild ===
During World War I, Ukiah carried munition-filled rail cars for the war effort. Overloading of the ship caused hull strains so severe that the government paid for complete rebuilding of the ship. Shipwrights at the Southern Pacific yard labored for two years—eventually replacing all of its structure above the waterline. This kind of reconstruction was called "jacking up the whistle and sliding a new boat underneath." The refurbished ferry was christened Eureka in honor of the Northern California city, which also happened to be the new northern termination of the Northwestern Pacific Railroad.

As a passenger ferry, she could carry 2,300 passengers and 120 automobiles. At that time, she was the biggest and the fastest double-ended passenger ferry boat in the world—299 feet 6 inches (91.29 m) long, with an extreme width of 78 feet (24 m) and gross tonnage of 2,420 tons.

=== 1920s through retirement ===
Between 1922 and 1941 Eureka was on the Sausalito commuter run. As the largest of the Northwestern boats, Eureka made the heaviest commuter trips - the 7:30 from Sausalito and the 5:15 from San Francisco. Each trip averaged 2,200 passengers. During this period the upper deck included seating areas, a magazine stand, and a restaurant that served full meals.

Eureka was primarily a passenger boat, carrying very few cars. After 1929, though, she sometimes made an extra run from the Hyde Street Pier in San Francisco, carrying autos on Sundays.

Completion of the Golden Gate Bridge between San Francisco and Marin in 1937 doomed ferry service. Northwestern Pacific first cut service, then abandoned ferries altogether in 1941.

During the war years, Eureka joined a number of bay ferries in the work of transporting troops from Camp Stoneman in Pittsburg, California, up the Sacramento River, to the port of embarkation piers in San Francisco.

By the 1950s Eureka served by linking Southern Pacific's cross-country trains, which terminated at Oakland, with San Francisco until 1957, when she snapped an engine crank pin. That service was discontinued the following year. In 1958, Eureka joined the fleet of historic ships now at the National Historical Park.

In the late 1990s she was used as a main filming location for the TV-show Nash Bridges.

In October 1999, Eureka entered San Francisco Drydock for a $1 million restoration project focusing on the vessel's superstructure—the above-water portions of the vessel. A significant portion of that restoration was the replacement of the boat's "kingposts"—four large wooden structures that support the paddlewheels and upper decks.

== Design ==
Although a number of large ferryboats survive in the US, Eureka is the only one with a wooden hull. She is one of the most impressive remaining examples of traditional American wooden shipbuilding.

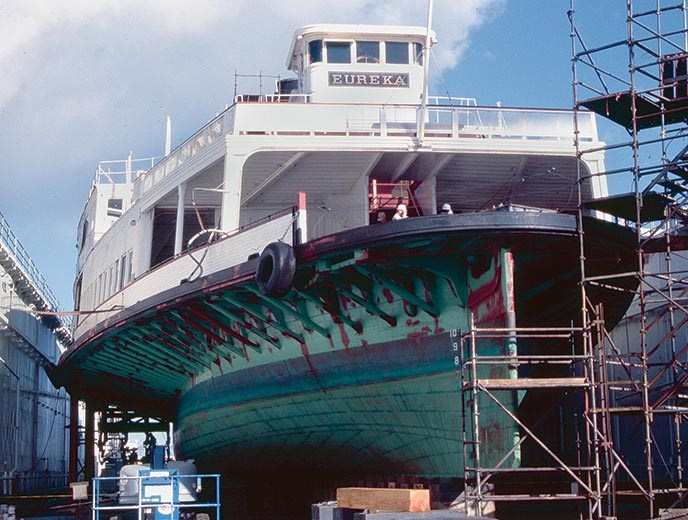
In drydock, ca. 1998

Beneath her upperworks, the round-bottomed hull is 42 feet (13 m) wide and 277 feet (84 m) long. The house rests on a platform extending 18 feet (5.5 m) from the hull on either side.

Her walking beam engine was originally powered by coal-fired boilers that were converted to oil in 1905. The engine was built in 1890 by the Fulton Iron Works in San Francisco. Eureka is one of only two surviving vessels equipped with a walking beam engine, alongside the Ticonderoga, and the only one still afloat.

With the increased length of 5 feet (1.5 m), Eureka became the largest wooden passenger ferry ever built. She was certified to carry 3,500 people.

== See also ==
- Ferries of San Francisco Bay
