= OCSC Sailing =

Sailing facility in Berkeley, California

OCSC SAILING was an accredited US SAILING Certification facility in Berkeley, California, located on San Francisco Bay. The name is an abbreviation for Olympic Circle Sailing Club, the Olympic Circle being a two nautical mile in diameter ring of racing buoys located directly outside the Berkeley Marina. (Note: There are several Olympic Circles around the country. They are used to conduct races as there are buoys at every 45 degrees on the circle, with one buoy at the center.)

== History ==
Sailor Anthony Sandberg founded the club in 1979 on the Alameda Estuary. In 1980, Richard Jepsen joined Anthony as a partner in the business and they moved OCSC SAILING to the Berkeley Marina to take advantage of sailing conditions where 25-30 knot winds are typical. In March, 2020 the club was temporarily closed for the CoViD-19 pandemic and then in March, 2021 OCSC was closed and Inspire Sailing, owned by Leigh Hunt, took over their facilities. In the first quarter of 2023, Inspire Sailing merged with Modern Sailing School & Club of Sausalito, also owned by Leigh Hunt, to create a new entity named Modern Sailing.

== Sailing School ==
Class offerings ranged from beginning sailing to celestial navigation and ocean passage making. All instructors were US Coast Guard licensed and US Sailing certified, and time on the water was supplemented with classroom instruction. In addition to the sailing school there was a club membership program which offers special classes and discounts on charter boat rentals to more than 1,100 members. Club members also could choose from a variety of seminars, lectures, movies, social events and adventure travel vacations that focused on the communal nature of sailing.

== Campus ==
OCSC SAILING occupied a six-acre campus in the Berkeley Marina directly on San Francisco Bay. It comprised three docks with over 50 boats; a club room with views of the Golden Gate Bridge; classrooms; a pro shop; a gear rental service; and a professional service department. The company also offered team and consulting activities that use sailing to emphasize teamwork, communication, on-the-spot problem solving and leadership.

== Yacht Management and Sales ==
OCSC SAILING maintains the largest fleet of charter yachts in a single location on the West Coast and runs its own fleet service department. Boat owners contracting with OCSC SAILING in the charter management program receive yacht care and services in addition to 50% of the charter fee when their boat is used.

== Vacation Charters ==
OCSC SAILING also provides adventure travel programs to a variety of locations around the world. Many of the trips center on sailing and flotillas, while others are centered on land based activities such as trekking.

== Giving Back ==
OCSC SAILING was an ongoing sponsor of sailing programs for disadvantaged youth in San Francisco, Oakland, Berkeley and the East Bay. In addition, a percentage of net annual sales was donated to social causes and groups that preserve and restore the natural environment.
