= César Chávez Park =

City park of Berkeley, California

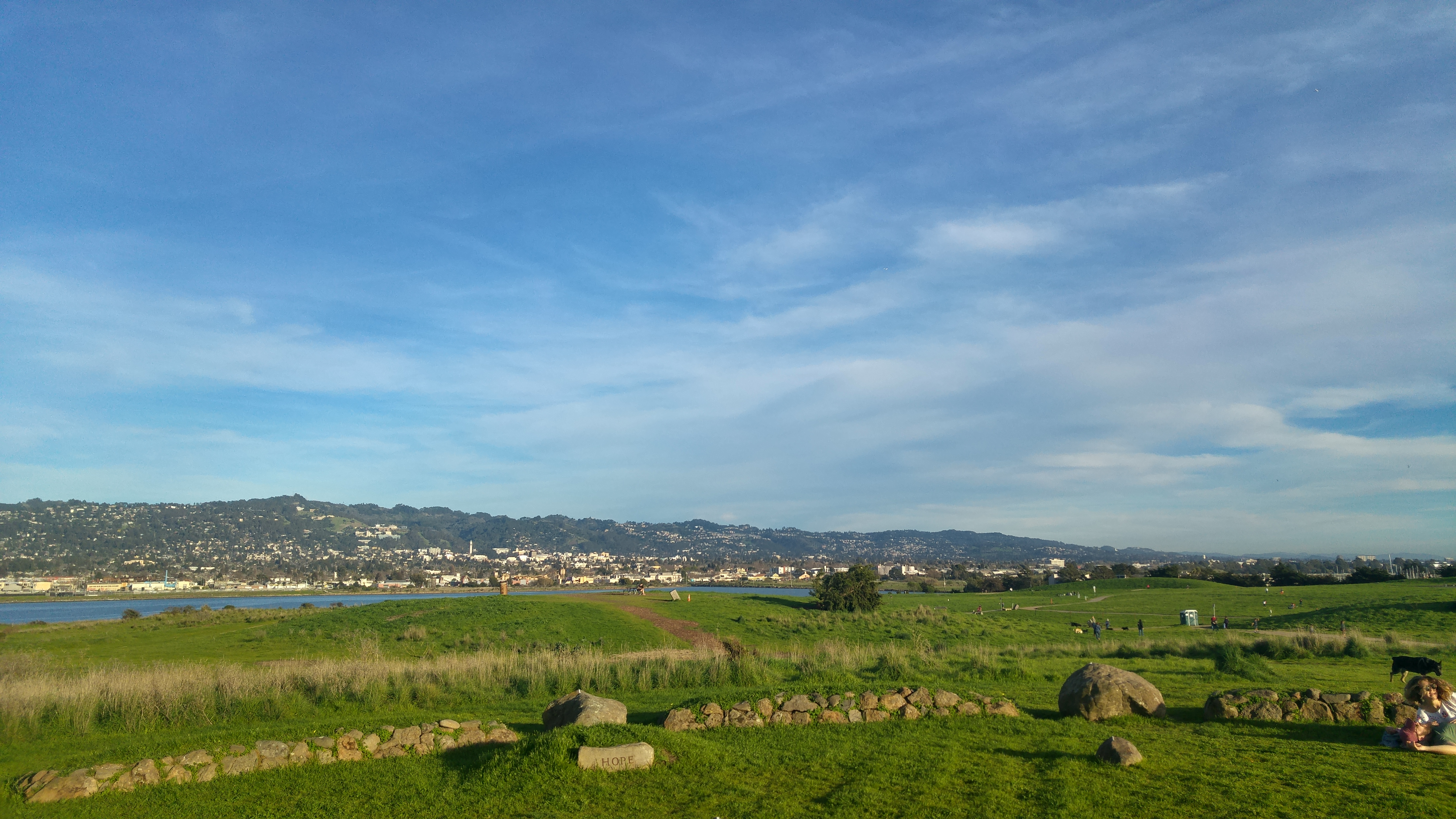
- Interactive map of César Chávez Park
- Type: Urban park
- Location: Berkeley, California
- Coordinates: 37.87241°N 122.31942°W
- Area: 90 acres (36.42 ha)
- Created: 1997
- Operator: City of Berkeley, California
- Open: 6 a.m. to 10 p.m.
- Status: Open year round

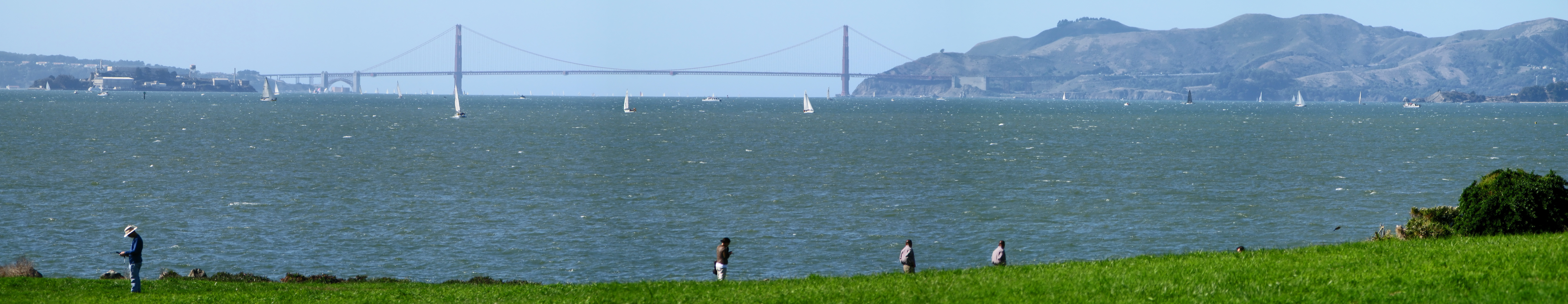
The park provides a westward view onto Alcatraz, the Golden Gate Bridge and San Francisco Bay.

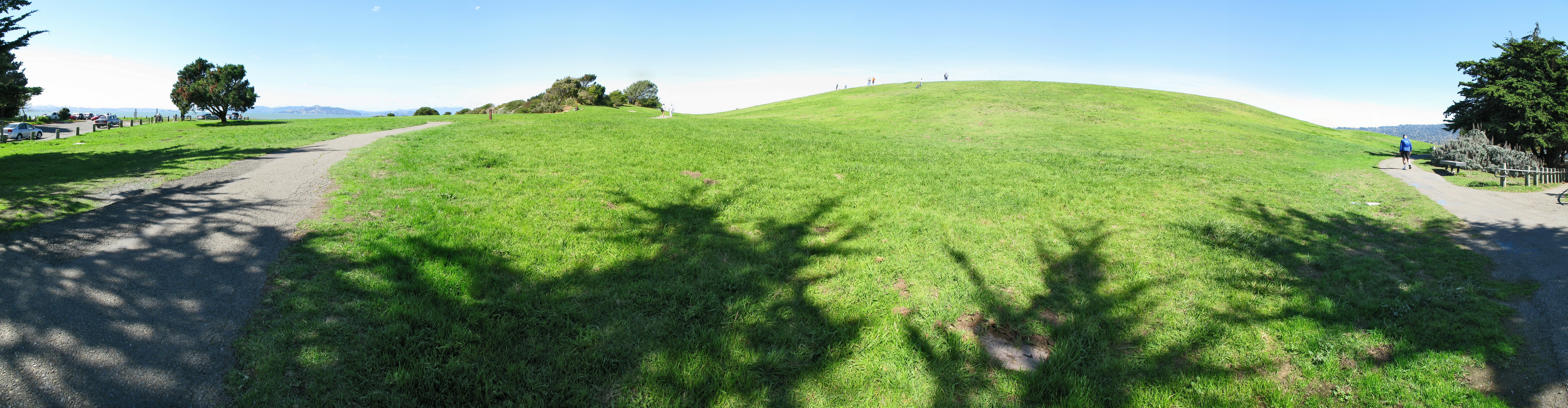
The grassy hills of César Chávez Park.

César Chávez Park is a 90 acres (36 ha) city park of Berkeley, California named after César Chávez. It can be found on the peninsula on the north side of the Berkeley Marina in the San Francisco Bay and is adjacent to Eastshore State Park.

The park's east position in San Francisco Bay provides panoramic views of San Francisco, the Golden Gate Bridge, the Marin Headlands, and the East Bay hills. The park's terrain is characterized by very open grassy hills that have become popular for kite flying. Paved paths run the perimeter and throughout the park where picnic tables and barbecue grills are available to the public.

== Features ==
- Grassy areas for kite flying, "Frisbee" playing, etc. (no officially designated sports fields).
- Hiking on trails throughout the park; the 1.25-mile (2.01 km) Dorothy Stegmann trail around the park's perimeter is fully wheelchair accessible.
- Off-leash dog area (17 acres [6.9 ha]).
- Picnic tables with BBQ grills (several arranged for large groups).
- Solar Calendar.
- Wildlife sanctuary.
- The park's traditional public washroom was closed in 2015, but, in 2019, City Council considered replacing it with a more robust Portland Loo.

== History ==
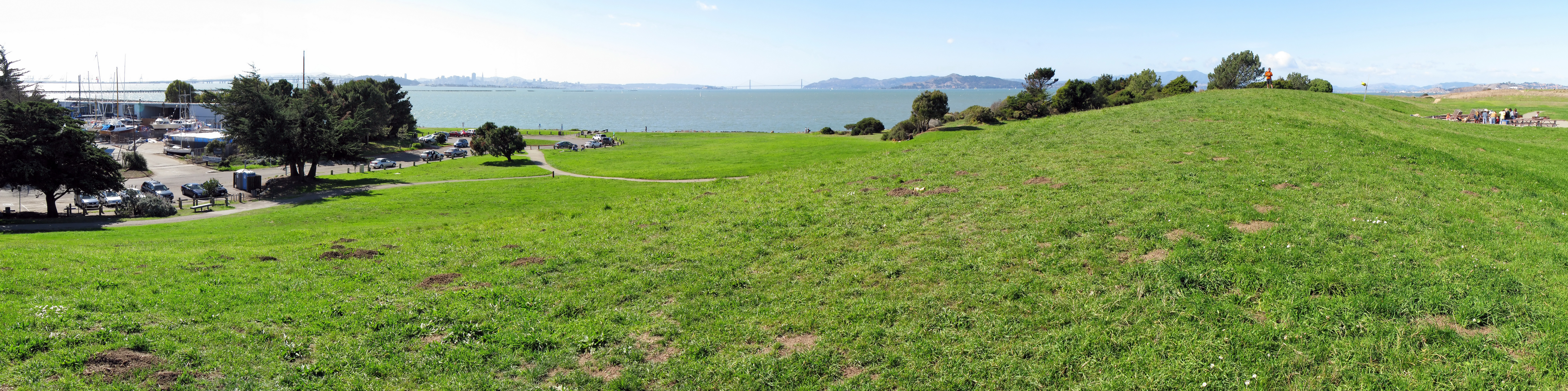
View from hillside into San Francisco Bay

The park began as a landfill dating back to 1957, when dikes were constructed for the purpose of containing municipal waste. In 1969, the city adopted the Marina Master Plan, which set aside the landfill area for unstructured recreation. In 1991 the city completely sealed the landfill and the park opened soon thereafter, originally as North Waterfront Park. In 1996, the city renamed the park after César E. Chávez, union leader and founder of the United Farm Workers of America.

== Landfill gas ==
A landfill gas flare station lies on the eastern side of the park. Decomposition of the garbage below emits gases, primarily methane. To prevent its uncontrolled seepage from the ground, the gas is collected by over 40 extraction wells buried throughout the park and routed to the flare station, which then de-waters and burns it at over 1,470 °F (800 °C), converting approximately 99% of the collected methane into carbon dioxide. Though both methane and carbon dioxide are greenhouse gases that contribute to the ongoing climate crisis, the conversion of methane to CO_{2} reduces its heat-trapping effectiveness by a factor of 25.

A 1990 study reported low levels of methane seepage from the underlying waste and attributed the absence of gases to rapid oxidation by soil microorganisms. As an alternative to the incinerator, local activists proposed to leverage the effect as a bioremediation method. The proposal was rejected by the Bay Area Air Quality Management District due to its experimental nature.

In 2016, the waning flow of gas was unable to properly sustain the existing flare station, leading to problems including visible smoke, flames, and odor emanating from the chimney. As a result, the original incinerator, which was built in 1989, was replaced with a newer, smaller model better designed to be sustained by the lesser supply of fuel.

== Activities ==
Popular activities include model rocket launching, kite flying, drone and model airplane flying, picnicking, dog walking, jogging and walking. Although on a peninsula, the park has no access to the water because there are no beaches nor steps down through the park's reinforced shoreline.

== Events ==
Revellers watching the Summer Solstice sunset

- Solstice and Equinox celebrations at the Solar Calendar: Celebrations are held quarterly on the solstices and equinoxes. These celebrations include both scientific and cultural components. From the web site: "Many cultural celebrations are rooted in the cycles of the sun and moon, especially the solstices and equinoxes. For example, Easter, Passover, Narooz in the Spring, Rosh Hashanah, Kwanzaa, Christmas in the winter, etc."
- Fourth of July Celebration and Fireworks: While most of this event is held elsewhere in the Marina, many people gather on the small hills at Cesar Chavez Park to watch the fireworks.
- Berkeley Kite Festival: Annual event held the last weekend in July. Hundreds of kites of all sizes are flown by amateurs and professionals. Thousands of people attend, making parking difficult.
