= Aquatic Park (Berkeley) =

Green space on the East Bay shore

Coordinates: 37.856871°N 122.298859°W

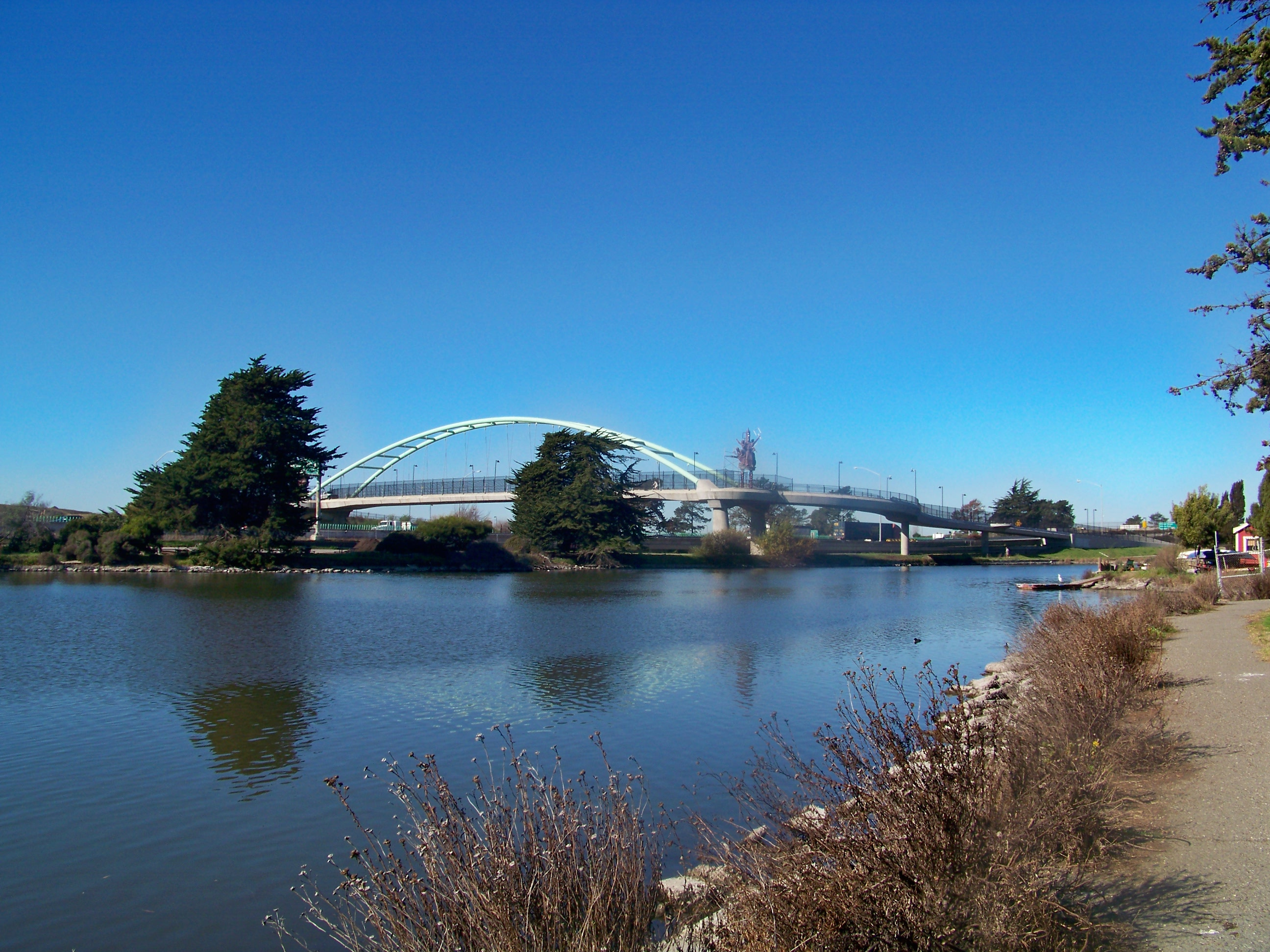
Pedestrian Bridge at the north end of the park

Aquatic Park is a public park in Berkeley, California, United States, located just east of the Eastshore Freeway (Interstate 80) between Ashby and University Avenues. The Works Progress Administration created the park in the 1930s simultaneously with the nearby Berkeley Yacht Harbor. Its centerpiece is an artificial mile-long lagoon that was cut off from San Francisco Bay by the creation of a causeway for the Eastshore Highway, during the construction of the approaches to the San Francisco–Oakland Bay Bridge, also in the 1930s. The lagoon still communicates with the Bay through culverts under the freeway (one in line with Ashby Avenue, the other in line with Grayson Street). The east shoreline of the lagoon used to be the original shoreline of San Francisco Bay.

== Park features ==
Aquatic Park features picnic areas, "Dream Land for Kids"—a large children's playground, a pedestrian-bicycle path, and a disc golf course. The lagoon is used by the Berkeley Paddling and Rowing Club year round, and by the Berkeley Water Ski Club during the summer months. The lagoon is also used by the nonprofit organization, Waterside Workshops, for their youth boating and sailing, and boat rentals to the general public on weekends. Waterside Workshops also houses a community bike shop at the intersection of Bolivar Drive and Bancroft Way. Historically, the Aquatic Park lagoon was also a practice site for the University of California crew teams.
