= University Avenue (Berkeley) =

Road in Berkeley, California

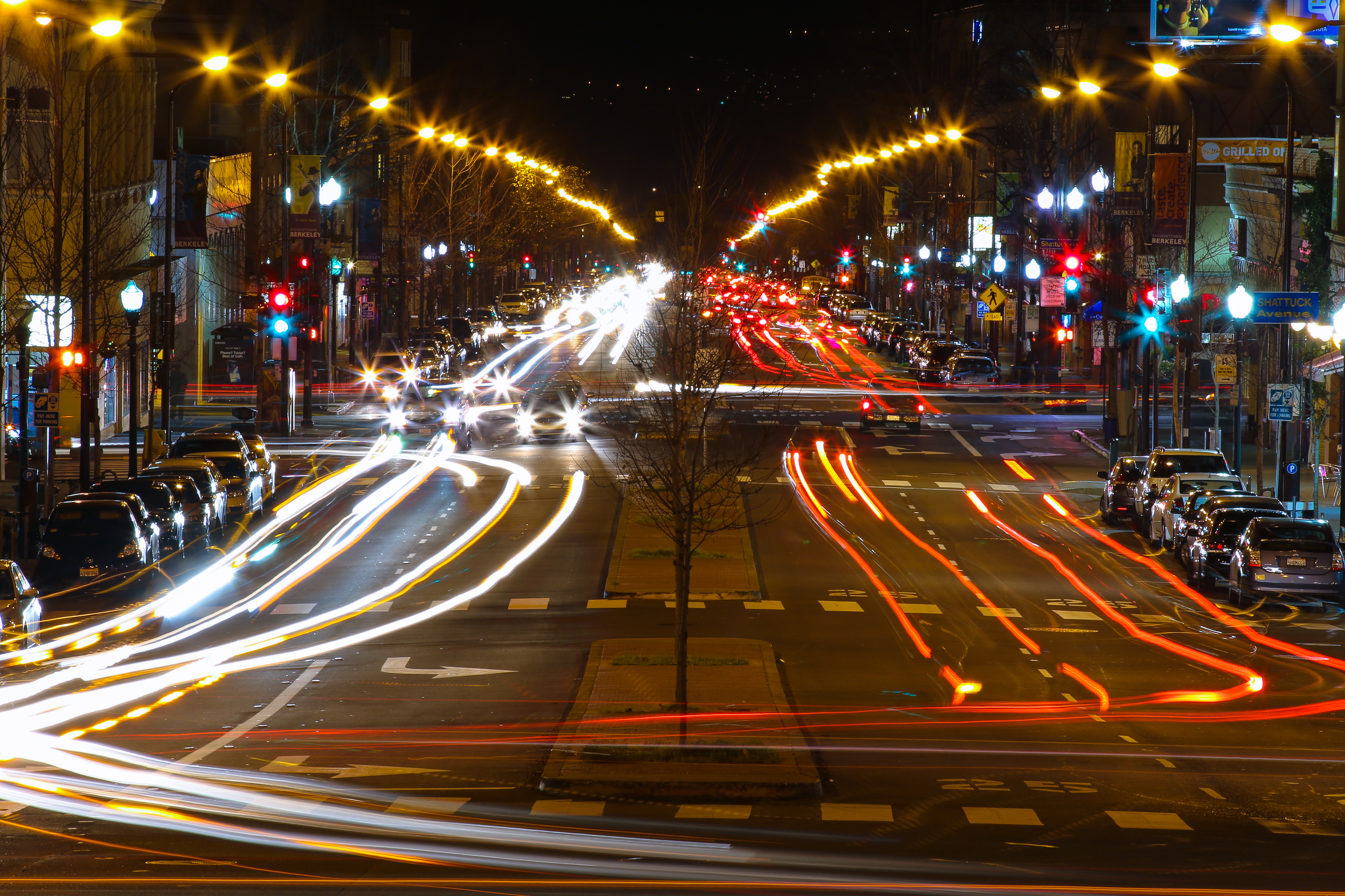
University Avenue looking west near Shattuck Avenue at night, 2019

University Avenue is a major east–west roadway in Berkeley, California. It runs from the Berkeley Marina in the west to the University of California, Berkeley campus in the east.

The western end of the street to Berkeley Marina was constructed in 1926 on top of the former Golden Gate Ferry causeway.

On January 6, 1940, an overpass was opened, carrying University Avenue over the tracks of the mainline of the Southern Pacific along 3rd Street in West Berkeley, eliminating a dangerous grade crossing and traffic bottleneck for traffic coming on and off the Eastshore Highway at University Avenue. Traffic lights were installed at the Eastshore–University intersection as part of the overpass project.
