= Hyde Street Pier =

Pier in San Francisco, California

Coordinates: 37.80897°N 122.42117°W

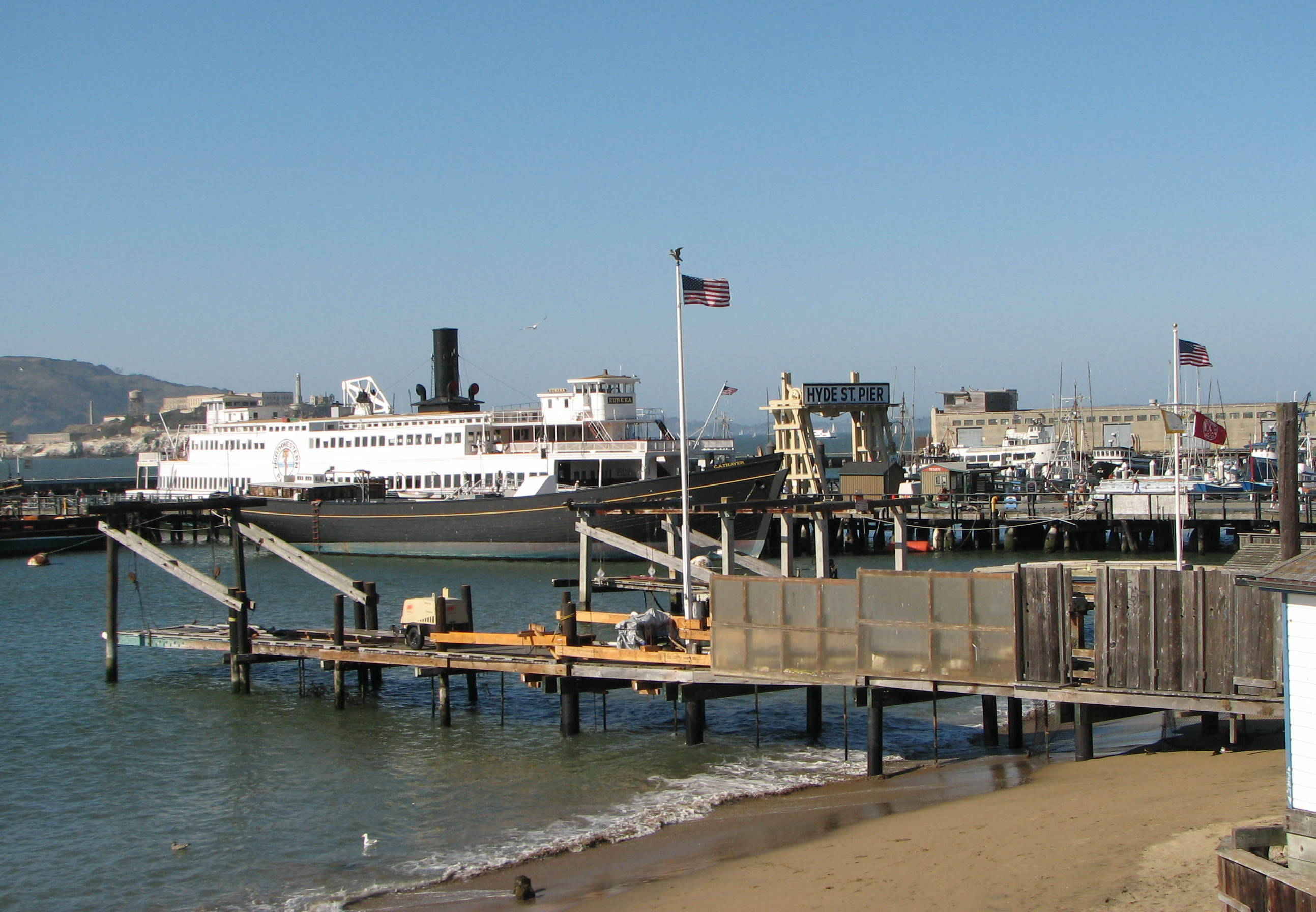
Hyde Street Pier

The Hyde Street Pier, at 2905 Hyde Street, is a historic ferry pier located on the northern waterfront of San Francisco in the U.S. state of California.

== Background ==
Prior to the opening of the Golden Gate Bridge and the San Francisco–Oakland Bay Bridge, it was the principal automobile ferry terminal connecting San Francisco with Marin County by way of Sausalito to the north, and the East Bay by way of Berkeley. It was designated part of U.S. Route 101 and U.S. Route 40. The ferries began operation by the Golden Gate Ferry Company. In early-1929, the Golden Gate Ferry Company merged with the competing auto ferry system of the Southern Pacific Railroad, with ferry service to the Hyde Street Pier taken over by the new "Southern Pacific-Golden Gate Ferries, Ltd." starting on May 1, 1929.

The pier is part of the San Francisco Maritime National Historical Park. Various historical ships are moored to the pier, some available for self-guided or docent-led tours. Among the ships on display or in storage are the Balclutha, an 1886 square rigged sailing ship, as well as C.A. Thayer, Eureka, Alma, Hercules, Eppleton Hall, and over one hundred smaller craft. In 2023, the Hōkūleʻa, a Polynesian double-hulled voyaging canoe, docked here as part of its Moananuiakea voyage, the circumnavigation of the Pacific Ocean.
