= Fraternity row =

Fraternity row or Fraternity Row may refer to:

- An area with a concentration of fraternities and sororities, frequently found in college towns:
  - Piedmont Avenue (Berkeley)
- Fraternity Row (Film)
- Fraternity Row, a "soap within a soap" on ABC's One Life to Live
