= Loring House =

Historic place in Berkeley, California

- U.S. National Register of Historic Places
- Berkeley Landmark
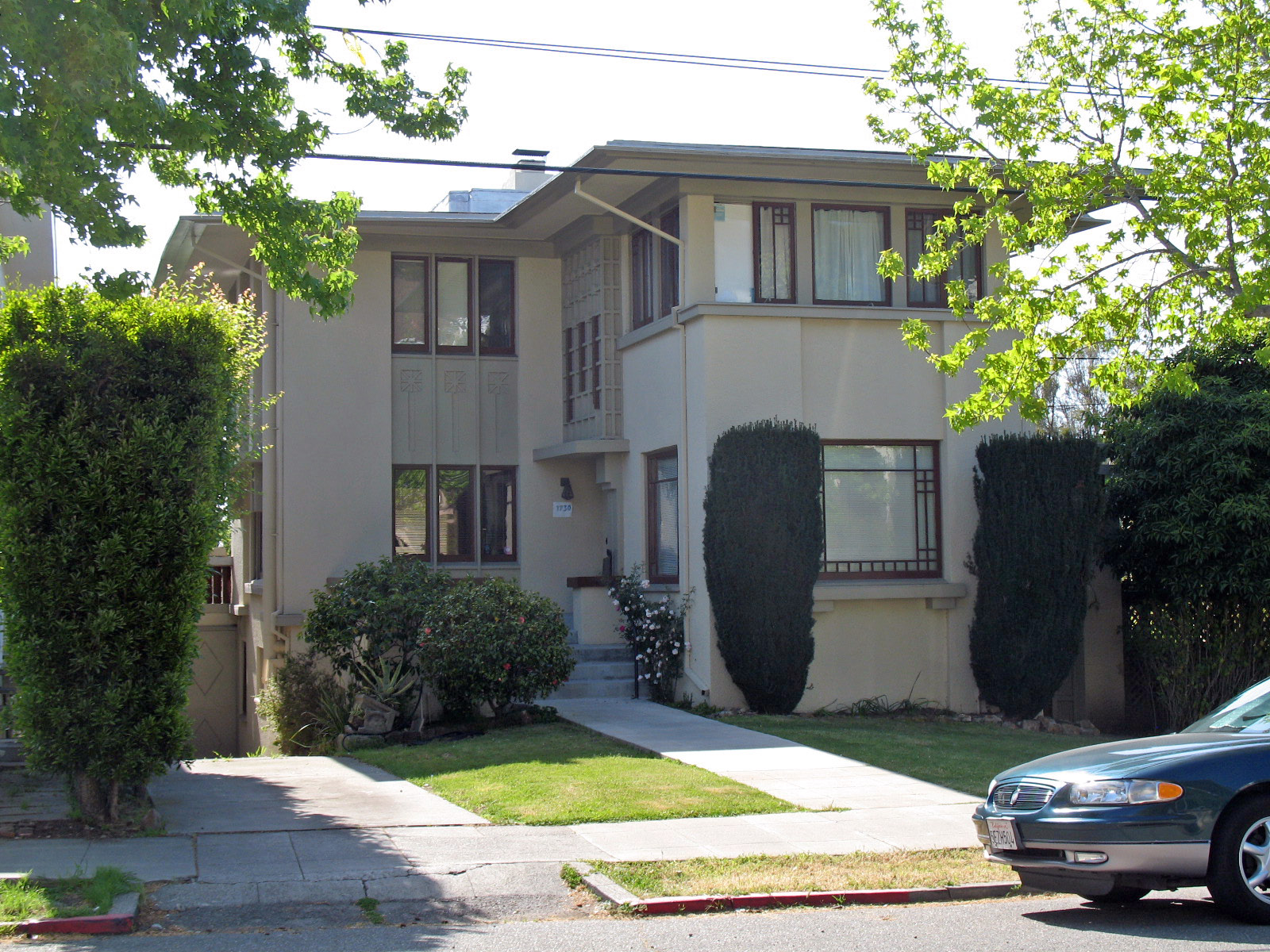
- Loring House

- Location within Oakland, California Location within California Location within the United States
- Location: 1730 Spruce St., Berkeley, California
- Coordinates: 37.876467°N 122.265611°W
- Built: 1914; 112 years ago
- Architect: John Hudson Thomas
- Architectural style: Prairie School architecture
- NRHP reference No.: 89000857
- BERKL No.: 128

Significant dates
- Added to NRHP: July 13, 1989
- Designated BERKL: October 16, 1989

Loring House is a historical commercial building, built in 1914 in Berkeley, California, U.S.. The building and it site was listed on the National Register of Historic Places on July 13, 1989; and is a Berkeley Landmark since October 16, 1989. It is also called the William Lovering Locke House, and the Ernest L. Loring House.

== History ==
The Loring House was designed by architect John Hudson Thomas (1878—1945), in a Prairie School architecture style. Thomas attended and graduated from both Yale University in 1901, and University of California at Berkeley in 1904. The Loring House is located at 1730 Spruce Street, Berkeley. The two-story Loring House is a small home with a basement. It is built with a wood frame, stucco walls, flat rood and wood trim. The Prairie School architecture style has Viennese secessionist motifs in the interior and exterior. The house is the earliest example of Prairie School architecture in Berkeley. Prairie School architecture style was design of Frank Lloyd Wright (1867—1959), first found in the midwest and Chicago.

== See also ==
- National Register of Historic Places listings in Alameda County, California
- List of Berkeley Landmarks in Berkeley, California
