= Carol Sibley =

- Born: April 4, 1902
- Died: 1986 (aged 83–84)
- Education: Wellesley College
- Occupation: Civic activist
- Parent(s): Charles Elbert Rhodes and Mary Bates Rhodes
- Awards: Benjamin Ide Wheeler Medal, Alumna Achievement Award (Wellesley College)

Carol Rhodes Sibley (1902–1986), nee Rhodes, was a prominent civic activist in Berkeley, California. Sibley is perhaps best known as a member of the Berkeley School Board from 1961 to 1971, and sometimes its president, during a time when Berkeley became one of the first cities in the country to racially desegregate its schools. With her husband Robert, Sibley was also deeply involved in the community life of the University of California, Berkeley.

== Biography ==
Carol Bates Rhodes was born on 4 April 1902 to Charles Elbert Rhodes and Mary Bates Rhodes (née Mary Williamson Bates, 1868-1944). She grew up with an older brother (Charles Elbert Rhodes, Jr.) and a younger sister (Ruth Mary Rhodes), in Upstate New York. She graduated in 1919 from Lafayette High School in Buffalo, as valedictorian and class poet. Her father was a Presbyterian minister and "taught every summer at Chautauqua Institution." Houseguests when she was growing up included Norman Thomas and Pearl S. Buck. Sibley began college studies at Wellesley College in 1919, graduating in 1923.

From 1923 to 1943 she was married to Paul Johnston, giving birth to two children, Mary Carol (b. 1925) and James Irvin II (b. 1927). They divorced in August, 1943. From 1941 to 1943, Carol Johnston was Alumnae Secretary for Wellesley College, and "travelled to nearly every Wellesley Club in the U.S.A. because alumnae could not come to College and President McAfee felt it was vital that they be kept in touch."

On 6 December 1943, in Washington, D.C., she married Robert Sibley (1881-1958), a professor of mechanical engineering at the University of California, Berkeley, who was an executive manager of the California Alumni Association (1923-1949), and later became director and president of the East Bay Regional Park District (1948-1958). She moved to Berkeley to be with him in June, 1944. The Sibleys lived for many years in a house known as Allanoke at the corner of Le Roy Avenue and Ridge Road in Berkeley. The house "in the 1940s and '50s in particular... was a center of UC Berkeley social life and was designated a city of Berkeley Landmark in 1986." In 1958, when Carol and Robert Sibley were traveling together in France, Robert died unexpectedly of a heart attack

Sibley was elected to the Berkeley School Board in 1961, giving the board "for the first time... a four-to-one liberal majority." Because of their support for school desegregation, Sibley and another board member, Sherman J. Maisel, were subjected to a recall election on October 6, 1964, in which they retained their seats, and their detractors experienced a "rout," by a margin of about 23,000 to 15,000 votes.

Sibley received the 1973 Benjamin Ide Wheeler Medal for distinguished service to the Berkeley community. Sibley received the 1975 alumna achievement award from Wellesley College.

Sibley was the focus of an oral history published in 1980 by the Regional Oral History Office of the University of California, Berkeley, based on nine interviews conducted from 21 April to 3 August 1978.

Sibley died in 1986, and a memorial service was held at First Congregational Church.

== Works by Sibley ==
Oral history through University of California Berkeley:

- Sibley, Carol (1980). Carol Rhodes Sibley--building Community Trust, Berkeley School Integration and Other Civic Endeavors, 1943-1978: An Interview. Regional Oral History Office, Bancroft Library, University of California, Berkeley. FULL PDF

Other works:

- Sibley, Carol (1972). Never a Dull Moment: The History of a School District Attempting to Meet the Challenge of Change: Berkeley, California, 1955-1972. Documentation & Evaluation of Experimental Projects in Schools.
- Sibley, Robert; Sibley, Carol (2010). University Of California Pilgrimage: A Treasury Of Tradition, Lore And Laughter. Kessinger Publishing, LLC. ISBN 978-1163820636. OCLC 2939223. (Kessinger Legacy Reprint, 2010; originally published by Lederer, Street & Zeus Co., 1952)
- Sibley, Carol Rhodes. Carol Sibley papers, 1922-1984 (bulk 1950-1980).

Sibley's oral history states that wrote "about 48 articles for the California Monthly on subjects of special interest to women, 1944-1949."

== Sources ==
- Rorabaugh, W. J. (1989). Berkeley at War: The 1960s. New York: Oxford University Press. ISBN 9780198022527.
- Anonymous [about Gabrielle Morris video] (24 March 2010). "Berkeley School Desegregation through the Eyes of Carol Sibley". The Berkeley Revolution.
- Hampson Eget, Patricia Louise (2011). Envisioning Progressive Communities: Race, Gender, and the Politics of Liberalism, Berkeley, California and Montclair, New Jersey, 1920–1970 [doctoral dissertation]. New Brunswick, NJ: Rutgers, The State University of New Jersey.
- "Carol Rhodes Sibley '23". Wellesley College.
