= Allanoke Manor =

Historical manor found in Berkeley, California, constructed in 1903

Allanoke
- Interactive map of the Allanoke area

General information
- Location: 1777 Le Roy Avenue, Berkeley, California, United States
- Coordinates: 37°52′35.6″N 122°15′29.9″W
- Construction started: 1903
- Completed: 1904
- Owner: Allen Gleason Freeman (1903-1930), Jessie Freeman (1930-1940), Robert Sibley (-1958), Carol Sibley (1958-1986), Frederick Binkley and Marian Frances (late 1980s–2017), New Bridge Foundation (2018-)

Design and construction
- Architect: Ernest Coxhead
- Designations: Berkeley Landmark (#113)

Allanoke Manor or Allanoke, is a historic private residence in Berkeley, California. The main part of Allanoke has the address 1777 Le Roy Avenue, and its former carriage house has the address 2533 Ridge Road, each about one block north of the campus of the University of California, Berkeley. The home was declared by the City of Berkeley, a Berkeley Landmark in November, 1986. It is also known under the variant spelling Allenoke or Allenoke Manor, or as the Robert Sibley House, and the Allen G. Freeman House.

== History ==
Allanoke Manor was designed by Ernest Coxhead, and built in 1903, completed in 1904. It is built with clinker bricks in a cross between Georgian and Dutch colonial styles. In the Fall of 1904, it was the site of "a series of cello and piano recitals performed by Frederick Stickney Gutterson and his wife, Minnie Marie."

Allanoke Manor's first owner, Allen Gleason Freeman (1853–1930), was born in Flushing, Michigan and a fruit merchant. In 1887 he married Jessie Katherine Marsh (1858–1940) Mr. and Mrs. Freeman were Unitarian Universalists.

In 1919, the Freemans erected a carriage house, described by Thompson as "Allanoke carriage house", across Le Roy street at 2533 Ridge Road. Designed by architect Clarence Tantau, the carriage house was late observed to include a gate post with the name "Allanoke" engraved on it.

Allanoke survived the 1923 fire, which destroyed many nearby Berkeley buildings.

In the late 1980s, the university was offered but declined to purchase the estate. Allanoke was then acquired by Frederick M. Binkley (1924–2006) and his wife Marian Frances (1924–2017), who restored Allanoke to single-family use. On 16 July 2018, Allanoke was sold to the New Bridge Foundation.

In a 2017 letter sent to Berkeley's Landmarks Preservation Commission, local researcher Daniella Thompson stated that the correct spelling of the manor's name is Allanoke. She supplied several reasons, including that "this name appears on the gate-post of the carriage house at 2533 Ridge Road." Thompson authored an article on the website of the Berkeley Architectural Heritage Association that contains photographs of the "Allanoke" spelling on the carriage house gate-post, as well as newspaper notices of the 1904 recitals, and Mrs. Freeman's will from 21 Sept 1938.

== Notable residents ==
Allanoke was the home of Robert Sibley and Carol Sibley. Robert Sibley (1881–1958), a professor of mechanical engineering at the University of California, Berkeley, who was an executive manager of the California Alumni Association, as well as director and president of the East Bay Regional Park District (1948–1958). His wife Carol Sibley (1902–1986) was a prominent local civic activist who played a pivotal role in Berkeley's school desegregation in the 1960s.
