= List of Berkeley landmarks =

This is a list of landmarks in Berkeley, California. "Berkeley Landmarks", "Structures of Merit", and "Historic Districts" are a classification given by the City of Berkeley for buildings or areas of local historic importance. As of 2022, there are 346 listed landmarks by the city of Berkeley. Many of the properties have also received recognition at the federal level by inclusion on the National Register of Historic Places or by designation as National Historic Landmarks

== Color markings (highest noted listing) ==
Berkeley Landmark
California Historical Landmark
US National Register of Historic Places
National Historic Landmark

== List of Berkeley Landmarks ==
# (Note: Numbers are as identified per ordinance. Blue colors represent designations as National Historic Landmarks and listing on the National Register of Historic Places; yellow represents sites that are Berkeley Landmarks. No color represents demolished monuments.)	Name	Image	Address	Date	Description
1	Berkeley City Hall		2134 Grove Street (now Martin Luther King, Jr. Way)	December 15, 1975	37.8691°N 122.2733°W also called Old Berkeley City Hall, and the Maudelle Shirek Building starting in 2007
2	Berkeley Women's City Club		2315 Durant Avenue	December 15, 1975	now the Berkeley City Club
3	Town and Gown Club	Upload image	2401 Dwight Way	December 15, 1975	designed by Bernard Maybeck
4	William R. Thorsen House		2307 Piedmont Avenue	December 15, 1975	now Sigma Phi Society Chapter House
5	First Church of Christ, Scientist (Berkeley, California)		2619 Dwight Way	December 15, 1975	
6	Church of the Good Shepherd, Episcopal		1823 Ninth Street	December 15, 1975	
7	Westminster Presbyterian Church	Upload image	926 Hearst Avenue	December 15, 1975	
8	St. John’s Presbyterian Church		2640 College Avenue	December 15, 1975	designed by Julia Morgan
9	Rose Walk		2500 block of Rose Walk, between Euclid and Le Roy Avenues	December 15, 1975	designed by Bernard Maybeck
10	Park Congregational Church	Upload image	1802 Fairview Street	June 21, 1976	now South Berkeley Community Church
11	Edward F. Niehaus House		839 Channing Way	June 21, 1976	
12	Captain Charles C. Boudrow House	Upload image	1536 Oxford Street	June 21, 1976	
13	Napoleon Bonaparte Byrne House & Grounds	Upload image	1301 Oxford Street	June 21, 1976	house was destroyed by fires in 1984 and 1985; and demolished in 1988.
14	Joseph W. Harris House	Upload image	2300 Le Conte Avenue	June 21, 1976	
15	Andrew Cowper Lawson House	Upload image	1515 La Loma Avenue	August 16, 1976	house for Andrew Cowper Lawson
16	Drawing Building (Naval Architecture Building)	Upload image	Hearst Avenue, University of California, Berkeley campus	October 18, 1976	now Richard C. Blum Hall
17	Senior Hall		Behind the Faculty Club, University of California, Berkeley campus	February 25, 1991	also known as Senior Men’s Hall; and Golden Bear Lodge; designed by John Galen Howard
18	Berkeley Day Nursery		2031 Sixth Street	February 22, 1977	now West Berkeley Children’s Center
19	John Galen Howard House	Upload image	1401 Le Roy Avenue	March 21, 1977	also known as the Gregory–Howard House
20	Golden Sheaf Bakery		2071 Addison Street	October 17, 1977	designed by Clinton Day
21	Borja House	Upload image	1629 Fifth Street	December 19, 1977	also known as Jucksch Cottage
22	Barker Block	Upload image	2486 Shattuck Avenue	January 16, 1978	
23	The Studio Building		2045 Shattuck Avenue	May 15, 1978	formerly The Berkeley Hotel
24	Fox Court		1472–1478 University Avenue	November 20, 1978	
25	Bonita Apartments	Upload image	1940 University Avenue	January 15, 1979	
26	Bonita Hall (Berkeley Bay Commons)	Upload image	1912–1918 Bonita Avenue	February 20, 1979	
27	Jeremiah T. Burke House	Upload image	2911 Russell Street	May 14, 1979	it housed the Judah L. Magnes Memorial Museum from 1966 to 2009.
28	Manuel Silva House	Upload image	1824 Fifth Street	May 14, 1979	
29	Morse Block (Donogh Arms)	Upload image	2276 Shattuck Avenue	June 18, 1979	
30	Samuel C. Clark Cottage	Upload image	2009 Berkeley Way	July 16, 1979	also known as Morning Glory House and Dick Moore’s House
31	Toverii Tuppa (Finnish Hall)		1819 Tenth Street	July 16, 1979	
32	Charles W. Heywood House	Upload image	1808 Fifth Street	September 17, 1979	
33	College Women's Club		2680 Bancroft Way	November 19, 1979	now the Bancroft Hotel
34		Upload image			
35	Delaware Street Historic District		800 Block of Delaware Street and 1801 Fifth Street	December 17, 1979	Historic District West Berkeley Garden
36	Miss Eleanor M. Smith House & Cottage	Upload image	2529–2527 Hillegass Avenue	January 17, 1980	
37	Garfield Junior High School		1414 Walnut Street	May 20, 1980	1915 building by Ernest Coxhead. It was also known as Garfield Intermediate School, and was part of the Berkeley Unified School District administration. It is now the Jewish Community Center.
38	United States Post Office		2000 Allston Way	June 16, 1980	Civic Center Historic District
39	Webb Block	Upload image	1985 Ashby Avenue	December 6, 2004	also known as Hudson's Antiques
40	Boone’s University School		2029 Durant Avenue	March 16, 1981	
41	S. H. Kress & Co. Building		2036 Shattuck Avenue	April 20, 1981	
42	State Asylum for the Deaf, Dumb and Blind		2601 Warring Street	September 21, 1981	formerly California Schools for the Deaf and Blind; now Clark Kerr Campus
43	William T. Such Building	Upload image	2140 Oxford Street	August 17, 1981	now Oxford Hall
44	Corder Building		2300–2350 Shattuck Avenue	October 29, 1981	formerly Shattuck Apartments; Whitecotton Building; Witter Building
45	Anna Head School		2538 Channing Way	November 16, 1981	formerly Miss Head’s Preparatory School for Girls
46	Haviland Hall		University of California, Berkeley campus	November 16, 1981	
47	James Edgar House	Upload image	2437 Dwight Way	December 21, 1981	listed as a "Structure of Merit"
48	First Unitarian Church		2401 Bancroft Way	November 16, 1981	
49	Fred Turner Building	Upload image	2546 Bancroft Way	December 21, 1981	designed by Julia Morgan
50	Richfield Oil Co. Station	Upload image	1952 Oxford Street	December 21, 1981	demolished by U.C. in late 2021 for the Gateway student housing project.
51	Masonic Temple		2105 Bancroft Way	January 20, 1982	
52	First Finnish Evangelical Lutheran Church	Upload image	936 Channing Way	February 22, 1982	now known as Grace Baptist Church
53	Mercantile Trust Co.	Upload image	2959 College Avenue	March 15, 1982	now known as Wells Fargo Bank, designed by John Galen Howard
54	Bartine Carrington House	Upload image	1029 Addison Street	March 15, 1982	"Structure of Merit",
55	Odd Fellows' Temple	Upload image	2288 Fulton Street	April 19, 1982	
56	Berkeley Public Library		2090 Kittredge Street	April 19, 1982	
57	Strand Theater	Upload image	2966 College Avenue	May 24, 1982	now Elmwood Theater
58	Lorin Theater	Upload image	3332 Adeline Street	May 24, 1982	now Phillips Temple C.M.E. Church
59	Phi Delta Theta Chapter House		2717 Hearst Avenue	May 24, 1982	
60	Young-Ghego House (Heywood-Ghego House)	Upload image	1809–1811 Fourth Street	June 21, 1982	
61	Hillside School		1581 Le Roy Avenue	June 21, 1982	
62	South Berkeley Bank	Upload image	3286 Adeline Street	July 19, 1982	now a Wells Fargo Bank
63	India Block	Upload image	3250 Adeline Street	July 19, 1982	
64	Carlson's Block	Upload image	3228 Adeline Street	July 19, 1982	
65	Cloyne Court Hotel		2600 Ridge Road	November 15, 1982	designed by John Galen Howard
66	Beta Theta Pi Chapter House	Upload image	2607 Hearst Avenue	November 15, 1982	designed by Ernest Coxhead, now the Goldman School of Public Policy
67	Captain Maury House	Upload image	1317 Shattuck Avenue	December 20, 1982	
68	Acheson Physicians' Building	Upload image	2131 University Avenue	January 17, 1983	
69	Shattuck Hotel		2200–2240 Shattuck Avenue	May 16, 1983, and November 9, 1987	the CA State Historic Resources Inventory Designation expanded in 1987 to include entire block.
70	Knox Presbyterian Church	Upload image	2108 Russell Street	June 21, 1983	now the Church by the Side of the Road; "Structure of Merit"
71	John Muir School	Upload image	2955 Claremont Avenue	July 18, 1983	
72	Hillside Club Street Improvements in the Daley’s Scenic Park Tract	Upload image	Hillside Club Street	July 18, 1983	includes Annie’s Oak
73	Fidelity Guaranty Building and Loan Association Building	Upload image	2323 Shattuck Avenue	October 17, 1983	
74	Howard Automobile Co. Showroom	Upload image	2140 Durant Avenue	October 17, 1983	
75	Charles R. Brown House	Upload image	1614 Sixth Street	November 21, 1983	
76	Mikkelsen and Berry Building	Upload image	2124–2126 Center Street	December 19, 1983	
77	Thornburg Village (or Normandy Village)	Upload image	1781–1851 Spruce Street	December 19, 1983	
78	Shattuck Square Building	Upload image	48, 82 Shattuck Square	February 27, 1984	
79	Samuel G. Davis House	Upload image	2547 Channing Way	February 27, 1984	
80	Tupper and Reed Building		2271–2275 Shattuck Avenue	March 19, 1984	
81	Morrill Apartments	Upload image	2429–2437 Shattuck Avenue at Haste Street	May 21, 1984	
82	Whittier School	Upload image	1645 Milvia Street	June 25, 1984	Interior renovations in 1994
83	Claremont District Public Improvements	Upload image	Claremont Avenue, The Uplands, Hillcrest Avenue, Brookside Avenue	October 15, 1984	
84	People’s Park		2526 Haste Street/2448 Bowditch Street/2551 Dwight Way	November 19, 1984	
85	Chamber of Commerce Building		2140–2144 Shattuck Avenue at Center Street	December 17, 1984	Conservation easement held by CA Preservation Foundation
86	Mason-McDuffie Building	Upload image	2101 Shattuck Avenue	January 21, 1985	
87	Warren Cheney House and Cheney Cottage	Upload image	2241 & 2243 College Avenue, University of California, Berkeley campus	September 17, 1990	demolished in 2010 and the Cheney Cottage was moved to 1632 62nd Street
88	Federal Land Bank	Upload image	2180 Milvia Street	April 15, 1985	part of the Civic Center Historic District; formerly the Farm Credit Administration and Civic Center Building
89	Veterans' Memorial Building		1931 Center Street	April 15, 1985	part of the Civic Center Historic District
90	Samuel Hume House	Upload image	2900 Buena Vista Way	June 17, 1985	
91	Public Amenities (Northerly Gateways)	Upload image	Claremont Avenue	October 15, 1984	
92	Captain Higgins' Temperance Grocery Store	Upload image	834 Delaware Street	June 17, 1985	
93	Berkeley Municipal Incinerator	Upload image	1120 Second Street	July 15, 1985	
94	Weisbrod Building	Upload image	2001 San Pablo Avenue	July 15, 1985	"Structure of Merit"
95	William E. Colby House	Upload image	2901 Channing Way	July 15, 1985	designed by Julia Morgan
96	Fullen Market Building	Upload image	1523–1531 San Pablo Avenue	July 15, 1985	
97	Durkee Famous Foods Plant	Upload image	2900 Fifth Street	August 6, 1985	
98	Suendermann Plumbing Co.	Upload image	921 University Avenue	November 18, 1985	
99	Mercantile Trust Company	Upload image	2959 College Avenue	March 15, 1982	
100	Benjamin Ide Wheeler House and Garden	Upload image	1820 Scenic Avenue	January 13, 1986	
101	Manasse-Block Tanning Company		1300 Fourth Street	April 21, 1986	
102	Cooper Woodworking Building and American Photoplayer Co.	Upload image	1250–1260 Addison Street	April 21, 1986	
103		Upload image			
104	G. Paul Bishop Studio	Upload image	2125 Durant Avenue	July 21, 1986	
105	Kennedy-Nixon House	Upload image	1537 Euclid Avenue	July 21, 1986	
106	Kawneer Manufacturing Company	Upload image	2547 Eighth Street	July 21, 1986	
107	Maria Marsh House	Upload image	2308 Durant Avenue	August 18, 1986	
108	Davis-Harmes House	Upload image	1828 Fifth Street	September 15, 1986	moved in the 1960s from 733 Hearst Avenue
109	McCreary-Greer House	Upload image	2318 Durant Avenue	August 18, 1986	
110	U.S. Realty Corporation Building	Upload image	2101–2109 University Avenue	September 15, 1986	or MacFarlane Building; formerly "Structure of Merit"
111	J.J. Pfister Knitting Mill	Upload image	2600–2602 Eighth Street	November 17, 1986	
112	H.J. Heinz Building		2900 San Pablo Avenue	November 17, 1986	H.J. Heinz Company Factory for the Heinz Company
113	Allanoke	Upload image	1777 Le Roy Avenue	November 17, 1986	also known as Allen G. Freeman House, and Robert Sibley House
114	California Ink Company Industrial Site	Upload image	1326–1404 Fourth Street	November 17, 1986	
115	Haste Street Annex of McKinley School	Upload image	2419 Haste Street (now 2407 Dana Street)	January 26, 1987	"Structure of Merit"
116	Judge Benjamin Ferris House	Upload image	2314 Dwight Way	January 26, 1987	the first Alta Bates Hospital
117	Old Jefferson Elementary School	Upload image	1475 Rose Street	March 16, 1987	"Structure of Merit"
118	The Berkeley Inn	Upload image	2501 Haste Street	November 9, 1987	designed by Joseph Cather Newsom; damaged by fires in 1986 and 1990; now demolished.
119	Hunrick Grocery	Upload image	2211 Rose Street	September 19, 1988	"Structure of Merit"; demolished in 2004 and façade reconstructed in 2005
120	Bowles Hall and Charter Hill		Centennial Drive, University of California, Berkeley campus	October 17, 1988	designed by George W. Kelham
121	Maurer House	Upload image	1448 Sixth Street	November 21, 1988	"Structure of Merit"; demolished
122	City Hall Annex	Upload image	1835 Allston Way	November 21, 1988	formerly "Structure of Merit"
123	Berkeley Tennis Club	Upload image	2624 Hillegass Avenue	May 15, 1989	
124	Byron Jackson Iron Works	Upload image	700–730 Parker Street, Bldg. 12	December 18, 1989	"Structure of Merit"; formerly Cutter Laboratories; demolished
125	John Albert Marshall House No. 3	Upload image	2744 Telegraph Avenue	September 18, 1989	now the Rose Garden Inn
126	John Albert Marshall House No. 4	Upload image	2740 Telegraph Avenue	September 18, 1989	now the Rose Garden Inn
127	John Woolley House	Upload image	2506 Dwight Way	October 16, 1989	
128	Ernest L. Loring House		1730 Spruce Street	October 16, 1989	also known as Loring House
129	Kappa Sigma Chapter House	Upload image	2220 Piedmont Avenue	July 6, 1992	demolished in 1992 to construct the Haas School of Business
130	Piedmont Way		2200–2499 Piedmont Avenue	February 22, 1990	
131	Downtown YMCA		2001 Allston Way	February 22, 1990	for Young Men’s Christian Association
132		Upload image			
133		Upload image			
134	Kerna Maybeck Gannon House	Upload image	2780 Buena Vista Way	March 19, 1990	also known as Annie Maybeck House
135		Upload image			
136	Sigma Pi Chapter House	Upload image	2395 Piedmont Avenue	May 21, 1990	now Phi Gamma Delta
137	Sutliff Rock (Picnic Rock)	Upload image	550 Santa Rosa Avenue	May 21, 1990	"Site of Merit"
138	Arthur Ayers House	Upload image	2528 Benvenue Avenue	June 18, 1990	
139	Morrison House	Upload image	2532 Benvenue Avenue	June 18, 1990	"Structure of Merit"
140	Weltevreden	Upload image	1755 Le Roy Avenue	August 20, 1990	formerly Volney D. Moody House, and now Tellefsen Hall; "Structure of Merit"
141		Upload image			
142	Ernest V. Cowell Memorial Hospital		2215 College Avenue, University of California, Berkeley campus	November 19, 1990	demolished in 1993 to construct the Haas School of Business
143	Luther M. Williamson Building	Upload image	2120–2124 Dwight Way	February 25, 1991	
144	Williams Building	Upload image	2126–2128 Dwight Way	February 25, 1991	
145	Davis-Byrne Building		2138–2140 Dwight Way	February 25, 1991	
146	Durant Hall		Sather Road, University of California, Berkeley campus	February 25, 1991	formerly Boalt Hall; designed by John Galen Howard
147	California Hall		Sather Road, University of California, Berkeley campus	February 25, 1991	designed by John Galen Howard
148	Doe Memorial Library		University of California, Berkeley campus	February 25, 1991	designed by John Galen Howard
149	Founders' Rock		Hearst Avenue, University of California, Berkeley campus	February 25, 1991	
150	Giannini Hall		University Drive, University of California, Berkeley campus	February 25, 1991	
151	Room 307, Gilman Hall		Campus Drive, University of California, Berkeley campus	February 25, 1991	building designed by John Galen Howard; Room 307 was where chemist Glenn T. Seaborg and his coworkers identified plutonium
152	Hearst Memorial Mining Building		Mining Circle, University of California, Berkeley campus	February 25, 1991	designed by John Galen Howard
153	Hearst Greek Theatre		Gayley Road, University of California, Berkeley campus	February 25, 1991	designed by John Galen Howard
154	Phoebe Apperson Hearst Memorial Gymnasium for Women		Bancroft Way, University of California, Berkeley campus	February 25, 1991	designed by Bernard Maybeck and Julia Morgan; also known as Hearst Gymnasium for Women
155	Hilgard Hall		University Drive, University of California, Berkeley campus	February 25, 1991	
156	Faculty Club and Glade		Faculty Glade, University of California, Berkeley campus	February 25, 1991	designed by Bernard Maybeck
157	Sather Gate and Bridge		University of California, Berkeley campus	February 25, 1991	designed by John Galen Howard
158	Sather Tower and Esplanade		Esplanade Drive, University of California, Berkeley campus	February 25, 1991	also known as the Campanile
159					
160	South Hall		West Esplanade Drive, University of California, Berkeley campus	February 25, 1991	
161	University House		Hearst Avenue, University of California, Berkeley campus	February 25, 1991	designed by Albert Pissis; formerly the President’s Mansion and now the Chancellor’s House
162	Wellman Hall		University Drive, University of California, Berkeley campus	February 25, 1991	designed by John Galen Howard; also known as Agriculture Hall
163	Wheeler Hall		Campanile Way, University of California, Berkeley campus	February 25, 1991	designed by John Galen Howard
164	St. Joseph the Worker Catholic Church and Grounds	Upload image	1600–1640 Addison Street	March 18, 1991	site of Presentation High School; grotto demolished
165		Upload image			
166	West Berkeley Macaroni Factory	Upload image	2215 Fifth Street	January 28, 1991	"Structure of Merit"
167		Upload image			
168	Elks Club	Upload image	2018 Allston Way	October 7, 1991	
169	Joseph Alphonso House	Upload image	1814 Sixth Street	June 15, 1992	
170	Roberts Studio	Upload image	2134 Allston Way	January 6, 1992	later known as the Berkeley Community YWCA
171	Ashkenaz Music and Dance Community Center		1317 San Pablo Avenue	September 8, 1992	
172	West Berkeley YMCA	Upload image	2009 Tenth Street	January 6, 1992	"Structure of Merit"
173	The Temple of Wings		2800 Buena Vista Way	January 6, 1992	also known as the Charles C. Boynton House; originally designed by Bernard Maybeck
174	Orchard Lane	Upload image	Panoramic Hill	January 6, 1992	
175	Northbrae Public Improvements		Northbrae	February 3, 1992	includes Marin Circle, paths, parks, and stone monuments; designed by landscape architect and professor, R. E. Mansell
176	Thomas Andrews House	Upload image	1812 Sixth Street	June 15, 1992	
177	Edwards Stadium and Field		Bancroft Way at Fulton Street, University of California, Berkeley campus	November 2, 1992	
178	Edward Brakenridge House (Bonita House)	Upload image	1410 Bonita Avenue	October 6, 1992	designed by Ira A. Boynton
179	Berkeley Community Theater		300 block of Allston Way, Berkeley High School campus	December 7, 1992	also known as the Little Theater, Berkeley High School Shop & Science Buildings; Civic Center Historic District and Berkeley High School Campus Historic District
180	Hotel Durant		2600 Durant Avenue	February 1, 1993	"Structure of Merit"
181	Heywood Building	Upload image	2014–2018 Shattuck Avenue	April 12, 1993	
182	Bancroft Apartments	Upload image	2126 Bancroft Way	April 12, 1993	also known as Waste and Clark Apartments
183	Charles W. Woodworth House	Upload image	2237 Carleton Street	September 7, 1993	
184	Thousand Oaks Elementary School	Upload image	840 Colusa Street	December 6, 1993	demolished in 1997 to make way for new school buildings
185	Underwood Building	Upload image	2110–2114 Addison Street	November 1, 1993	also known as Virginia Apartments; "Structure of Merit"
186	Elmer Buckman House	Upload image	920 Shattuck Avenue	June 6, 1994	
187	Armstrong College	Upload image	2220 Harold Way	September 6, 1994	
188		Upload image			
189	Berkeley Municipal Rose Garden		Euclid Avenue between Bay View Place and Eunice Street	March 3, 1995	
190	Everett Glass House	Upload image	70 Twain Avenue	April 3, 1995	
191	La Loma Steps	Upload image	Pathway linking 1500 block of Le Roy Avenue & 2500 block of Buena Vista Way	October 2, 1995	
192		Upload image			
193	Harmon Gymnasium	Upload image	Bancroft Way, University of California, Berkeley campus	September 3, 1996	designed by George W. Kelham; altered beyond recognition in 1999 when reconstructed as Haas Pavilion
194	Jensen House	Upload image	1675 La Loma Avenue	October 7, 1996	
195	University Of California, Berkeley Campus Landscape Features	Upload image	University of California, Berkeley campus	November 4, 1996	
196	Longfellow School	Upload image	1500 Derby Street	December 2, 1996	
197	Framat Lodge #405 of the Vasa Order of America	Upload image	1900 Addison Street	April 7, 1997	
198	Charles John Dickman House and Cottages	Upload image	2549, 2551, 2551B, 2553, 2555 & 2555B Benvenue Avenue	July 7, 1997	
199	Harley and Villa Wiley House and Cottages	Upload image	2545 Benvenue Avenue	July 7, 1997	
200	Jennie C. Smith House	Upload image	2539 Benvenue Avenue	July 7, 1997	
201	Dr. Cornelius Beach Bradley House	Upload image	2639 Durant Avenue	November 3, 1997	now the Theta Xi Chapter House
202	Martin Luther King Jr. Civic Center Park	Upload image	between Allston Way, MLK Jr. Way and Center Street	November 3, 1997	Civic Center Historic District
203	Rev. Dr. Robert Bentley House	Upload image	2683 Le Conte Avenue	February 2, 1998	
204	George Edwards House	Upload image	2530 Dwight Way	April 6, 1998	
205	Berkeley Farm Creamery	Upload image	2108–2116 Allston Way	June 1, 1998	formerly John Hinkel Livery Stable, S. J. Sill Warehouse, and American Red Cross; "Structure of Merit"; demolished in 1999
206	Josiah J. Rose-Goldsmith House	Upload image	2919 Lorina Street	September 8, 1998	
207	Hobart Hall	Upload image	2606 Dwight Way	September 8, 1998	also known as Baptist Divinity School; designed by Julia Morgan
208	Euclid Apartments	Upload image	1865 Euclid Avenue	September 8, 1998	designed by John Galen Howard
209	Merton Joseph Congdon House	Upload image	2527 Piedmont Avenue	November 2, 1998	"Structure of Merit"
210	Spenger’s Fish Grotto		1915–1955 Fourth Street	November 2, 1998	
211	Fox Common		1670–1676 University Avenue	December 7, 1998	
212	Civic Center Historic District	Upload image	between Center Street & Allston Way, Milvia Street & Martin Luther King Jr. Way	December 7, 1998	also known as Berkeley Civic Center Historic District
213	North Berkeley Congregational Church	Upload image	2138 Cedar Street	January 4, 1999	also known as Grace North Church, and Christ Church East Bay
214	Theta Xi Chapter House	Upload image	1730 La Loma Avenue	January 4, 1999	now Kingman Hall
215	Baptist Divinity School		2606 Dwight Way	February 1, 1999	also known as American Baptist Seminary of the West
216	Rose and William Berteaux Cottage	Upload image	2612 Channing Way	June 7, 1999	moved in 2001 to 2350 Bowditch Street
217	Charles H. Rieber House	Upload image	15 Canyon Road	June 7, 1999	designed by Ernest Coxhead
218	George Lewis Bell House	Upload image	2118 Marin Avenue	August 2, 1999	
219	The Brasfield	Upload image	2520 Durant Avenue	September 13, 1999	also known as Beau Sky Hotel, and the Blue Sky Hotel
220	Ellen Blood House	Upload image	2508 Regent Street	September 13, 1999	also known as Tompkins House; "Structure of Merit"; moved in 2014 from 2526 Durant Avenue
221	The Albra	Upload image	2530–2534 Durant Avenue	September 13, 1999	"Structure of Merit"
222	Robcliff Apartment House	Upload image	2515 Channing Way	September 13, 1999	"Structure of Merit"
223	Epworth Hall	Upload image	2521 Channing Way	September 13, 1999	
224	Alexander C. Stuart House	Upload image	2524 Dwight Way	September 13, 1999	
225	Vine Street Pumping Plant	Upload image	2113 Vine Street	October 4, 1999	
226	Casa Bonita Apartments	Upload image	2605 Haste Street	November 1, 1999	
227	F. D. Chase Building	Upload image	2107–2111 Shattuck Avenue	January 3, 2000	"Structure of Merit"
228	West Berkeley Shellmound	Upload image	three blocks bounded by University Avenue, Hearst Avenue, I-880 and Fourth Street	February 7, 2000	
229	Westminster House and Grounds	Upload image	2700 Bancroft Way	April 3, 2000	also known as Unitas House
230	Swink House, Cottage and Garden	Upload image	1525–1529 Shattuck Avenue	May 1, 2000	"Structure of Merit"
231	John Hunter House	Upload image	2418 California Street	June 5, 2000	"Structure of Merit"; also listed as John Hopkins Spring Estate
232	Unit 1 U.C. dormitories	Upload image	Durant Avenue	September 2000	designed by Warnecke and Warnecke
233	Unit 2 U.C. dormitories	Upload image	Haste Street	September 2000	designed by Warnecke and Warnecke
234	J. Gorman and Son Building	Upload image	2599 Telegraph Avenue	December 4, 2000	
235	Ralph White House	Upload image	1841 Marin Avenue	January 8, 2001	
236	Elizabeth M. Kenney Cottage	Upload image	2214 Addison Street (now in storage)	February 5, 2001	also known as Kenney-Meinheit Cottage; moved to 1725 University Avenue in 1906; moved to 1275 University Avenue in 2003; dismantled and stored in October 2018
237	Southern Pacific Railroad Station		700 University Avenue	March 5, 2001	
238	John Hinkel Park		Southampton Avenue	April 2, 2001	
239	Walter H. Farley House	Upload image	147 Tunnel Road	July 9, 2001	"Structure of Merit"
240	John Brennan House	Upload image	1124–1126 Addison Street	July 9, 2001	designed by Peter Crinnion
241	Santa Fe Railway Station		1310 University Avenue	September 10, 2001	
242	Alphonso H. Broad House and Storefronts	Upload image	2115-2117-2119 Kittredge Street	October 1, 2001	"Structure of Merit"
243	Berkeley Public Library, North Branch	Upload image	1170 The Alameda	October 1, 2001	
244	La Loma Park Historic District	Upload image	La Loma Avenue between La Vereda Road and Buena Vista Way	May 6, 2002	Historic District, including 13 houses
245	UC Theater		2036 University Avenue	May 6, 2002	
246	Wallace and Lucy MacGregor House	Upload image	1962 Yosemite Road	June 3, 2002	
247	City of Berkeley Corporation Yard Building	Upload image	1326 Allston Way	July 1, 2002	
248	Jeffress House	Upload image	2944 Elmwood Court	"Structure of Merit"	
249	J.B. Tufts House	Upload image	2733 Buena Vista Way	July 1, 2002	also known as Tufts House No. 3; designed by Bernard Maybeck
250	Maybeck Cottage	Upload image	1 Maybeck Twin Drive	December 9, 2002	designed by Bernard Maybeck
251	Carrick House and Dunster Cottages	Upload image	1418 Spruce Street	December 9, 2002	
252	John A. Marshall-Erik O. Lindblom House	Upload image	2601 Hillegass Avenue	March 3, 2003	former home of Erik Lindblom
253	Brooks Apartments	Upload image	2231 Shattuck Avenue	April 7, 2003	also known as Amherst Hotel
254	Heywood Apartments	Upload image	2119 Addison Street	April 7, 2003	
255	John Kueffer House	Upload image	2430 Fulton Street	May 5, 2003	
256	West Berkeley Branch Library	Upload image	1125 University Avenue	May 5, 2003	"Structure of Merit"; demolished in 2012 and replaced
257	Alexandre and Marie Bertin Properties	Upload image	1952 University Avenue	June 2, 2003	"Structure of Merit"
258	Alexandre and Marie Bertin Properties	Upload image	1960 University Avenue	June 2, 2003	"Structure of Merit"
259	Bertha Bossé Cottage (southern)	Upload image	2426 Fulton Street	May 5, 2003	
260	Bertha Bossé Cottage (northern)	Upload image	2424 Fulton Street	June 2, 2003	
261	Stuart Daggett House	Upload image	1427 Hawthorne Terrace	July 14, 2003	
262	Frederick A. Thomas House	Upload image	883 Arlington Avenue	July 14, 2003	designed by Julia Morgan
263	Wright Block	Upload image	2161 Shattuck Avenue	September 8, 2003	
264	Concrete Grid Forms Company	Upload image	3075 Telegraph Avenue	September 8, 2003	demolished in 2004, but four exterior panels were stored
265	Harry H. Webb House	Upload image	2935 Otis Street	October 8, 2003	"Structure of Merit"
266	Hillside Club		2286 Cedar Street	January 12, 2004	
267	Mrs. Edmund P. King Building	Upload image	2502 Dwight Way	January 12, 2004	also known as King Building
268	George Morgan Building	Upload image	2053 Berkeley Way	January 12, 2004	
269	Albert E. Montgomery House	Upload image	45 Oak Ridge Road	February 2, 2004	
270	Sisterna Historic District	Upload image	between Fifth St. (west), Addison St. (north), Sixth St. (east), and Allston Way (south)	March 1, 2004	"Historic District"
271	Soda Water Works Building	Upload image	2509–2513 Telegraph Avenue	April 12, 2004	
272	University of California Press Building	Upload image	2120 Oxford Street	June 7, 2004	
273	S. J. Sill & Co. Grocery and Hardware Store	Upload image	2145 University Avenue (formerly 2139)	June 7, 2004	
274	Martha E. Sell Building	Upload image	2154–2160 University Avenue	June 7, 2004	
275	Ernest Alva Heron Building	Upload image	2136–2140 University Avenue	July 12, 2004	
276	Frederick H. Dakin Warehouse	Upload image	2750 Adeline Street	August 9, 2004	building has been altered after 2004
277	Edgar Jensen House	Upload image	1650 La Vereda Road	December 6, 2004	
278	Webb Block	Upload image	1985 Ashby Avenue	December 6, 2004	
279	Standard Die and Specialty Company	Upload image	2701 Eighth Street	March 7, 2005	
280	Berkeley Piano Club	Upload image	2724 and 2726 Haste Street	March 7, 2005	
281	Squires Block	Upload image	2100 Vine Street	May 9, 2005	"Structure of Merit"
282	Claremont Court Gate and Street Markers	Upload image	Claremont Blvd. at Russell St.; Claremont Ave. at Avalon Ave.; 2000 block of Forest Ave.; 2000 block of Derby St.; 2900 block of Russell St. at Oak Knoll Path	May 9, 2005	
283	Wallace W. Clark Building	Upload image	2375–2377 Shattuck Avenue	July 11, 2005	
284	Alfred Bartlett Houses	Upload image	2201 and 2205 Blake Street	December 5, 2005	
285	Oaks Theatre	Upload image	1861 Solano Avenue	February 2, 2006	
286	Laura Belle Marsh Kluegel House	Upload image	2667–2669 Le Conte Avenue	April 6, 2006	designed by John Hudson Thomas
287	California Memorial Stadium		between Piedmont Avenue and Stadium Rim Way	June 1, 2006	designed by John Galen Howard
288	Elmwood Hardware Building	Upload image	2947–2953 College Avenue	July 6, 2006	designed by William H. Weeks
289	Marie and Frederick A. Hoffman Building	Upload image	2988–2992 Adeline Street	July 6, 2006	designed by Henry Ahnefeld; "Structure of Merit"
290	Lawrence Berkeley National Laboratory Bevatron Site	Upload image	One Cyclotron Road, Lawrence Berkeley National Laboratory	August 3, 2006	demolished between 2009–2012
291	Phi Kappa Psi Chapter House	Upload image	770 La Loma Avenue	August 3, 2006	
292	Annie and Fred J. Martin House	Upload image	2411 Fifth Street	August 3, 2006	"Structure of Merit"
293	Clephane Building	Upload image	3027 Adeline Street	September 7, 2006	
294	Charles A. Westenberg House	Upload image	2811 Benvenue Avenue	September 7, 2006	designed by Albert Dodge Coplin
295	Wallace-Sauer House	Upload image	1340 Arch Street	November 2, 2006	
296	Ennor’s Restaurant Building	Upload image	2128–2130 Center Street	November 2, 2006	designed by James W. Plachek
297	Bernard and Annie Maybeck House No. 1	Upload image	1300 Martin Luther King Jr. Way	February 1, 2007	designed by Bernard Maybeck
298	Berkeley Iceland	Upload image	2727 Milvia Street	April 5, 2007	designed by William Clement Ambrose
299	Fred and Amy Corkill House	Upload image	2611 Ashby Avenue	April 5, 2007	designed by Russell R. Bixby
300	Berkeley High School Gymnasium	Upload image	1920 Allston Way	July 5, 2007	demolished in 2012; Berkeley High School Campus Historic District
301	Cambridge Apartments	Upload image	2500 Durant Avenue	September 6, 2007	designed by Walter H. Ratcliff Jr.
302	Hezlett’s Silk Store Building	Upload image	2277 Shattuck Avenue	March 6, 2008	
303	Brower Houses and David Brower Redwood	Upload image	2232–2234 Haste Street	August 7, 2008	
304	Donald and Helen Olsen House		771 San Diego Road	March 5, 2009	
305	Needham-Obata Building	Upload image	2525 Telegraph Avenue, 2512–2516 Regent Street	June 4, 2009	
306	Mobilized Women of Berkeley Building	Upload image	1007 University Avenue	July 20, 2009	
307	Koerber Building	Upload image	2054 University Avenue	September 3, 2009	
308	Capitol Market Building	Upload image	1500 Shattuck Avenue	September 3, 2009	
309	University YWCA	Upload image	2600 Bancroft Way	May 6, 2010	designed by Joseph Esherick
310	Fish-Clark House	Upload image	1545 Dwight Way	August 5, 2010	
311	Pelican Building (Anthony Hall)	Upload image	University of California, Berkeley campus	February 3, 2011	designed by Joseph Esherick
312	Duncan and Jean McDuffie House	Upload image	22 Roble Road	March 3, 2011	designed by Willis Polk
314	University Art Museum		2626 Bancroft Way, 2625 Durant Avenue	February 2, 2012	now Berkeley Art Museum and Pacific Film Archive
315	Mary J. Berg House	Upload image	2517 Regent Street	November 1, 2012	"Structure of Merit"; designed by William Garfield May
316	Harold E. Jones Child Study Center		2425 Atherton Street	June 6, 2013	
317	McCormack Residence	Upload image	18 Alvarado Road	October 3, 2013	designed by Walter H. Ratcliff Jr.
318	Lucinda Reames House No. 1	Upload image	2503 Regent Street	May 1, 2014	"Structure of Merit"; designed by Albert Dodge Coplin
319	Lucinda Reames House No. 2	Upload image	2509 Regent Street	May 1, 2014	"Structure of Merit"; designed by Albert Dodge Coplin
320	William Wilkinson House	Upload image	2511 Regent Street	October 2, 2014	"Structure of Merit"; designed by Albert Dodge Coplin
321	Channing Apartments	Upload image	2409 College Avenue	February 5, 2015	designed by Walter H. Ratcliff Jr.
322	Hull Undertaking Co. and Little Chapel of the Flowers	Upload image	3049–3051 Adeline Street, 1905, 1909, 1911–1915 Essex Street	September 3, 2015	
323	Bennington Apartments	Upload image	2508 Ridge Road	February 4, 2016	
324	Ali and Marion Yazdi Building	Upload image	2910–2912 Telegraph Avenue	July 7, 2016	owned formerly by Marion Carpenter Yazdi
325	Captain John Slater House	Upload image	1335 Shattuck Avenue	February 2, 2017	designed by Thomas J. Welsh
326	A.H. and Julia Broad House and Broad Apartment Building	Upload image	2030–2032 Bancroft Way	April 6, 2017	designed by Alphonso Herman Broad
327	University Laundry	Upload image	2526–2530 Shattuck Avenue	May 4, 2017	
328	Charles H. Spear House	Upload image	1905 Martin Luther King Jr. Way	July 6, 2017	
329	George A. Mattern/Berkeley Bank Building	Upload image	2500 Shattuck Avenue	February 1, 2018	"Structure of Merit"
330	Thomas and Louise Hicks House	Upload image	2901 Benvenue Avenue	March 1, 2018	
331	George Wilson House	Upload image	2415 Blake Street	December 6, 2018	
332	Torrey House and Torrey Cottage	Upload image	1 and 5 Canyon Road	December 6, 2018	designed by Ernest Coxhead; Panoramic Hill Historic District
333	Las Casitas Apartments	Upload image	1619 Walnut Street	June 6, 2019	designed by William Alexander Doctor; "Structure of Merit"
334	George and Ellen Blood House	Upload image	1495 Euclid Avenue/2526 Hawthorne Terrace	July 2, 2019	designed by Walter H. Ratcliff Jr.
335	Marsh-Sperry House	Upload image	1440 Hawthorne Terrace	September 5, 2019	designed by Henry Higby Gutterson
336	Sperry-McLaughlin House	Upload image	1450 Hawthorne Terrace	September 5, 2019	designed by Henry Higby Gutterson
337	Grace Stearns Dilley House	Upload image	1399 Queens Road	February 6, 2020	designed by Francis Joseph McCarthy
338	Whittemore/Woodworth House	Upload image	2043 Lincoln Street	March 5, 2020	
339	Captain James F. and Cecilia M. Luttrell House	Upload image	2328 Channing Way	July 2, 2020	designed by Ira Alton Boynton
340	The Borg Building	Upload image	2136–2154 San Pablo Avenue	October 1, 2020	
341	Steilberg House and Cottages	Upload image	One Orchard Lane, 1 Panoramic Way, 4 Mosswood Lane	December 3, 2020	Panoramic Hill Historic District
342	Schneider-Kroeber House, also known as Semper Virens	Upload image	1325 Arch Street	August 5, 2021	designed by Bernard Maybeck; former home of Ursula K. Le Guin
343	Wurts-Lenfest House	Upload image	2523 Piedmont Avenue	February 3, 2022	"Structure of Merit"
344	James T. Stocker-Loni Ding House	Upload image	1940 Hearst Avenue	March 3, 2022	former home of Loni Ding
345	California Theatre		2113 Kittredge Street	May 5, 2022	closed, in 2022 it was proposed for a housing development
346	Addison and Carrie Laflin House	Upload image	2119 Marin Avenue	September 1, 2022	designed by Walter H. Ratcliff Jr.; "Structure of Merit"

== List of Berkeley Structures of Merit ==
- Old Jefferson Elementary School
- Borja House (Jucksch Cottage)
- Alta Bates Hospital (demolished in 1981)
- James Edgar House
- Bartine Carrington House
- United Stores Realty Corp. Building
- Old City Hall Annex
- Knox Presbyterian Church (now Church by the Side of the Road)
- Weisbrod Building (Guy’s Drugs)
- U.S. Realty Corp. Building (MacFarlane Building) (formerly a Structure of Merit)
- Haste Street Annex of McKinley School
- Hunrick Grocery
- Maurer House (demolished)
- Morrison House
- Weltevreden
- West Berkeley Macaroni Factory
- West Berkeley YMCA
- Hotel Durant
- Underwood Building
- Berkeley Farm Creamery (demolished in 1999)
- Merton Joseph Congdon House
- Ellen Blood House
- The Albra
- Robcliff Apartment House
- F.D. Chase Building
- Swink House, Cottage and Garden
- John Hunter House
- Elizabeth M. Kenney Cottage (moved, and dismantled in 2018)
- Walter H. Farley House
- Alphonso H. Broad House and Storefronts
- Jeffress House
- West Berkeley Branch Library (demolished 2012)
- Alexandre and Marie Bertin Properties
- Harry H. Webb House
- Squires Block
- Marie and Frederick A. Hoffman Building
- Annie and Fred J. Martin House
- John Boyd House
- Mary J. Berg House
- Lucinda Reames House No. 1 and No. 2
- William Wilkinson House
- George A. Mattern/Berkeley Bank Building
- Las Casitas Apartments
- Wurts-Lenfest House
- Addison and Carrie Laflin House

== National Historic Landmarks and Districts ==
- Anna Head School for Girls - 2538 Channing Way
- Berkeley Day Nursery - 2031 6th St.
- Berkeley High School Historic Campus District—1980 Allston Way, Berkeley, CA 94704
- Berkeley Hillside Club - 2286 Cedar St.
- Berkeley Historic Civic Center District - Roughly bounded by McKinney Ave., Addison St., Shattuck Ave., and Kittredge St.
- Berkeley Public Library - 2090 Kittredge St.
- Berkeley Women's City Club - 2315 Durant Ave.
- Boone's University School - 2029 Durant Ave.
- Bowles Hall - Stadium and Gayley Way
- California Hall - Oxford St.
- Chamber of Commerce Building - 2140—2144 Shattuck Ave. & 2071—2089 Center St.
- Church of the Good Shepherd-Episcopal - 1001 Hearst St. at Ninth St.
- City Hall - 2134 Grove St.
- Cloyne Court Hotel - 2600 Ridge Rd.
- College Women's Club - 2680 Bancroft Way
- Corder Building - 2300—2350 Shattuck Ave.
- Cowell Memorial Hospital - 2215 College Ave.
- Doe Memorial Library - Oxford St.
- Drawing Building - Hearst Ave., University of California campus
- Durant Hall - Oxford St.
- Edwards Stadium - junction of Bancroft Way and Fulton St., UC Berkeley campus
- Faculty Club - Oxford St.
- First Church of Christ, Scientist - 2619 Dwight Way
- First Unitarian Church - 2401 Bancroft Way
- Founders' Rock - Oxford St.
- Fox Court - 1472—1478 University Ave.
- Garfield Intermediate School - 1414 Walnut St.
- Giannini Hall - Oxford St.
- Girton Hall - Off College Ave. next to Cowell Hospital, University of California, Berkeley campus
- Golden Sheaf Bakery - 2069—2071 Addison St.
- Haviland Hall - University of California Campus
- Hearst Greek Theatre - Oxford St.
- Hearst Gymnasium for Women - Oxford St.
- Hearst Memorial Mining Building - Oxford St.
- Hilgard Hall - Oxford St.
- Hillside School - 1581 Leroy Ave.
- LeConte Hall - Hearst and Gayley
- Loring House - 1730 Spruce St.
- Masonic Temple - 2105 Bancroft Way and 2295 Shattuck Ave.
- North Gate Hall - Oxford St.
- Phi Delta Theta Chapter House - 2717 Hearst Ave.
- Room 307, Gilman Hall, University of California - University of California at Berkeley campus
- Sather Gate and Bridge - U.C.Berkeley
- Sather Tower
- Senior Hall - University of California, Berkeley campus
- South Hall - Oxford St.
- St. John's Presbyterian Church - 2640 College Ave.
- State Asylum for the Deaf, Dumb and Blind - bounded by Dwight Way, City line, Derby and Warring Streets
- Studio Building - 2045 Shattuck Ave.
- Thorsen, William R., House - 2307 Piedmont Ave.
- Toveri Tupa (Old Finnish Hall) - 1819 10th St.
- Tupper and Reed Building - 2275 Shattuck Ave.
- U.S. Post Office - 2000 Milvia St.
- University House - Oxford St.
- Wellman Hall - Oxford St.
- Wheeler Hall - Oxford St.

== See also ==
- Alameda County landmarks:
  - California Historical Landmarks in Alameda County, California
  - National Register of Historic Places listings in Alameda County
- List of locally designated landmarks by U.S. state
