= Berkeley City Club =

- Berkeley Women's City Club
- U.S. National Register of Historic Places
- California Historical Landmark
- Berkeley Landmark
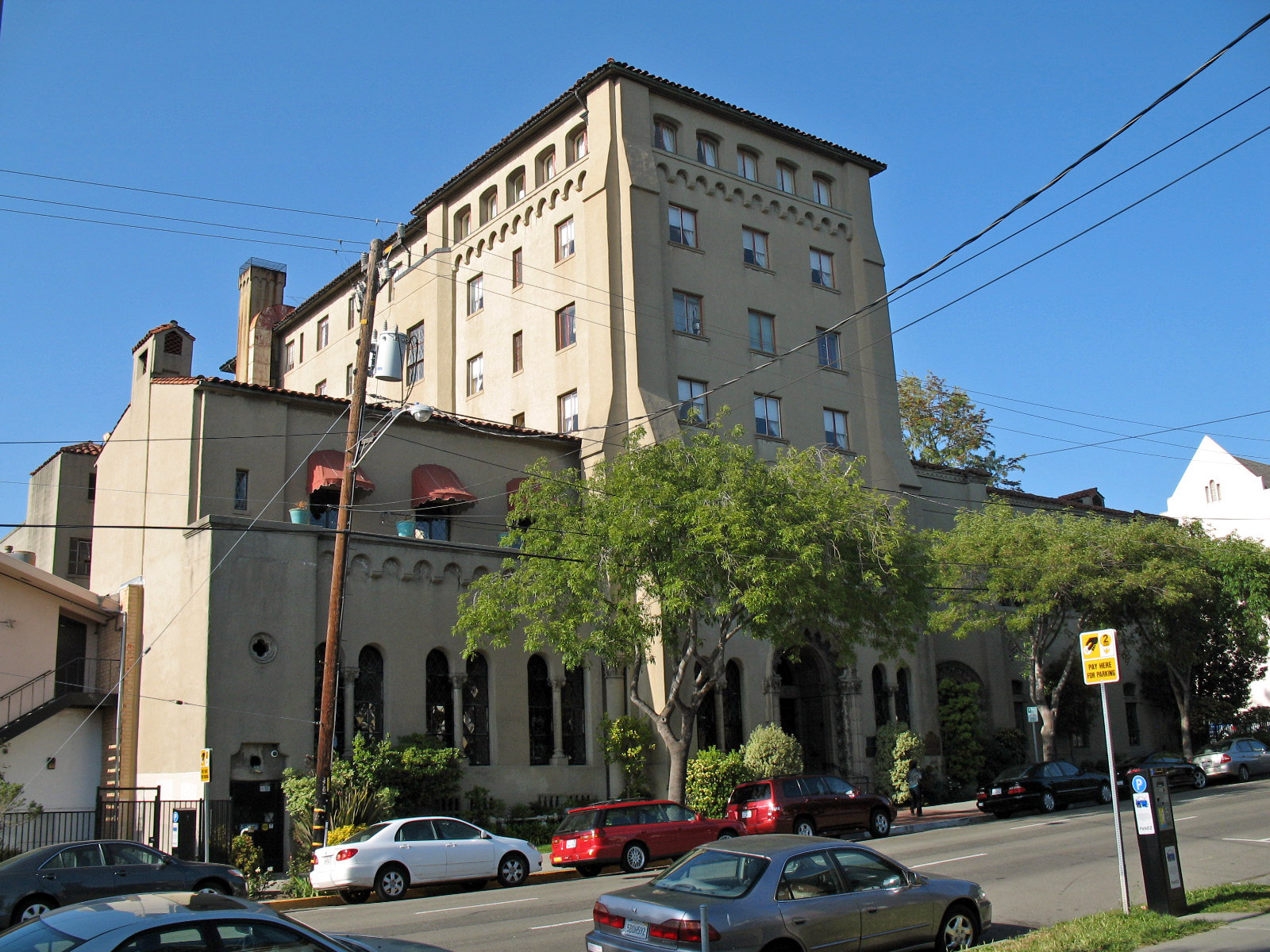
- The Berkeley City Club

- Location within Oakland, California Location within California Location within the United States
- Location: 2315 Durant Ave; Berkeley, California
- Coordinates: 37.8676°N 122.2628°W
- Built: 1929
- Architect: Julia Morgan
- NRHP reference No.: 77000282
- CHISL No.: 908
- BERKL No.: 2

Significant dates
- Added to NRHP: October 28, 1977
- Designated CHISL: May 12, 1977
- Designated BERKL: December 15, 1975

The Berkeley City Club is a historic hotel at 2315 Durant Avenue in Berkeley, California. It was commissioned as the club house of the Berkeley Women's City Club, organized in 1927 to contribute to social, civic, and cultural progress. This private club is no longer restricted to women, and the club house building is available to the public at large for overnight stays, weddings, and other occasions. On the second floor, the club also houses Julia's Restaurant and Morgan's Bar & Lounge. The 25 meter swimming pool is a major draw for members.

The building, constructed in 1929 and officially opened in 1930, is one of the outstanding works of noted California architect Julia Morgan. The San Francisco-born Morgan was the first woman to gain admission and earn a certificate from the Ecole de Beaux-Arts in Paris (1902) and the first licensed female architect in California. She designed nearly 100 women's-organization buildings throughout her career.

Her interpretation of Moorish and Gothic elements in the Berkeley Women's City Club created a landmark of California design. It is registered as California Historical Landmark and is listed on the National Register of Historic Places (NPS-77000282). The Berkeley City Club Conservancy cares for the building itself. Along with many other stewards of Julia Morgan properties, BCCC joined in the California Cultural and Historical Endowment's Julia Morgan 2012 Project.

== See also ==
- List of Berkeley landmarks
- List of works by Julia Morgan
- National Register of Historic Places listings in Alameda County, California
