= Berkeley High School Campus Historic District =

Historic district in California, US

- U.S. National Register of Historic Places
- U.S. Historic district
- California Historical Landmark
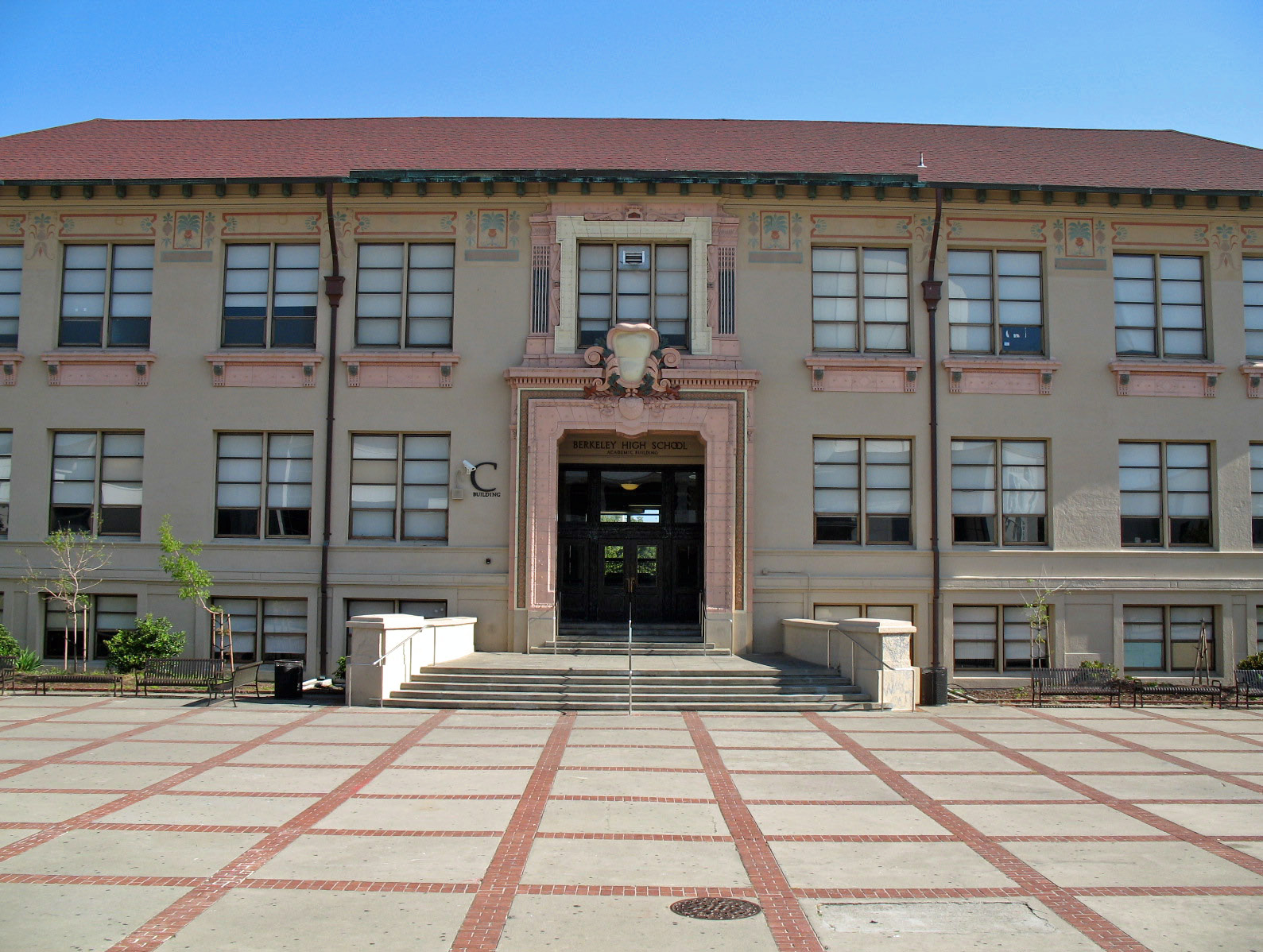
- Old Berkeley High School academic building (1922)

- Location within Oakland, California Location within California
- Location: 1980 Allston Way, Berkeley, California, U.S.
- Coordinates: 37.867694°N 122.271°W
- Area: 12.5 acres (5.1 ha)
- Built: 1922
- Built by: William C. Hays
- Architectural style: Beaux-Arts, Modern movement
- NRHP reference No.: 07001350
- CHISL No.: N2379

Significant dates
- Added to NRHP: January 7, 2008
- Designated CHISL: January 7, 2008

Berkeley High School Campus Historic District is a 12.5 acres (5.1 ha) historic district in Berkeley, California, U.S. It is situated on four consolidated city blocks, bordered by Martin Luther King Jr. Way, Allston Way, Milvia Street, and Channing Way; and contains the Berkeley High School campus. It has been listed on the National Register of Historic Places since January 7, 2008; and listed on the California Historical Landmark since January 7, 2008.

== History ==
Its period of significance runs from 1922 until 1950, beginning with the construction of architect William C. Hays' two classically influenced Italianate style school buildings — the academic building (1922) and the original gymnasium and natatorium (1922) and ending with the completion of the art deco-styled Berkeley High School Community Theater (1950).

The Berkeley High School Campus Historic District is comprised a total of eight buildings, and five of the buildings are contributing resources. The design, material and workmanship of the nominated features have remained largely intact, with the exception of necessary building safety retrofits to the academic building and the original gymnasium and natatorium (buildings C and M). The original gymnasium and natatorium (building M) was the subject of significant exterior changes; resulting in a change in the building's style from a classically-inspired Italianate style to a Streamline Moderne style.

== Notable buildings ==
- Berkeley High School Community Theater (1950), including the Florence Schwimley Little Theater
- academic building (building C) (1922), designed by William C. Hays as a centerpiece to the campus
- shop building (building G) (1939), art deco building designed by Henry H. Gutterson and William G. Corlett, Sr.
- science building (building H) (1940), art deco building designed by Henry H. Gutterson and William G. Corlett, Sr.
- original gymnasium and natatorium (building M) (1922), designed by William C. Hays and Walter H. Ratcliff Jr.; contains the physical education facilities, offices, classrooms, locker rooms, pools, and gymnasiums

== See also ==
- California Historical Landmarks in Alameda County
- National Register of Historic Places listings in Alameda County, California
- List of Berkeley Landmarks in Berkeley, California
