= Boone's University School =

Historic building in Berkeley, California

- U.S. National Register of Historic Places
- California Historical Landmark
- Berkeley Landmark
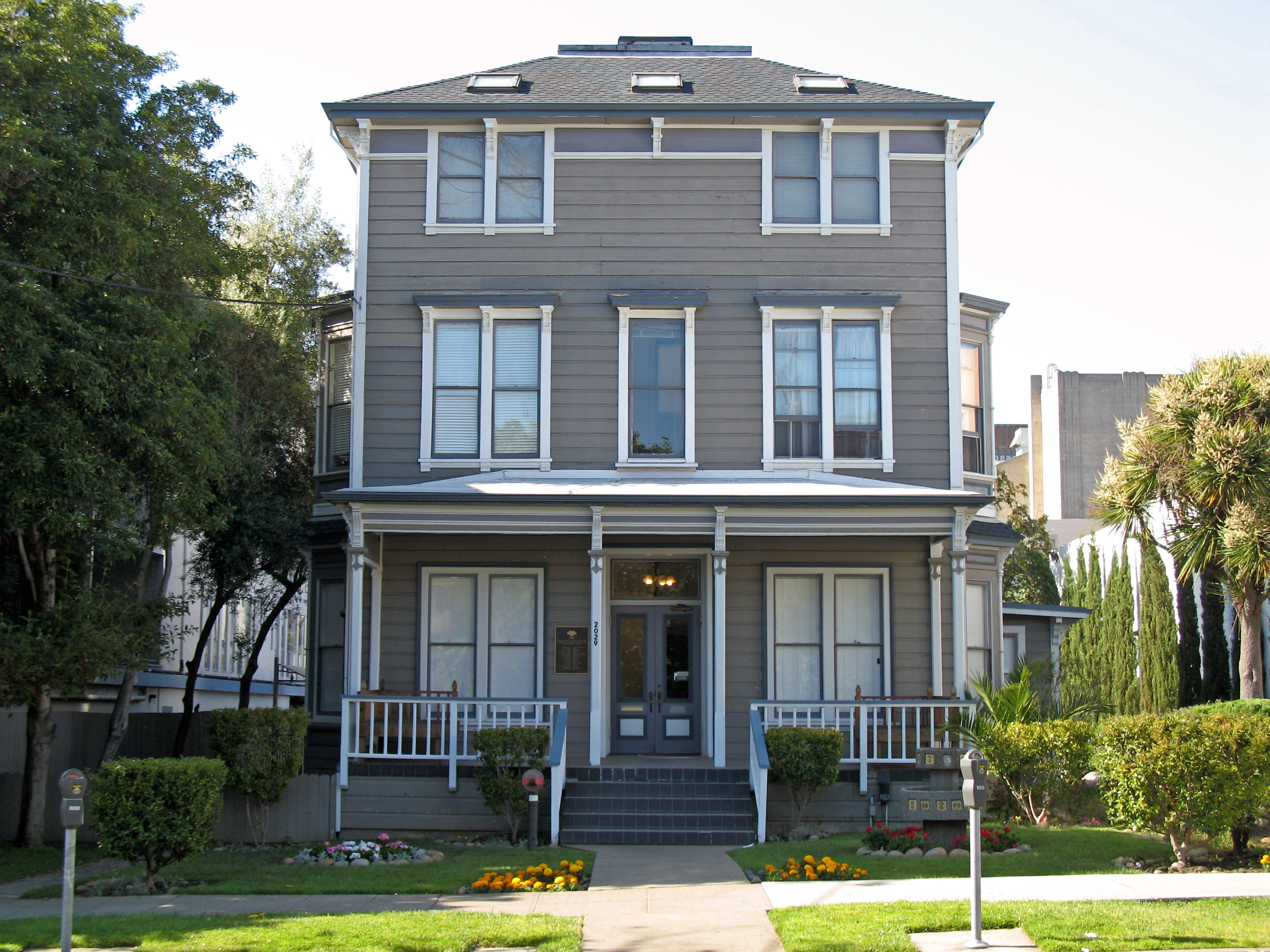

- Location within Oakland, California Location within California
- Location: 2029 Durant Avenue, Berkeley, California, U.S.
- Coordinates: 37°52′01″N 122°16′04″W
- Area: 0.2 acres (0.081 ha)
- Architectural style: Italianate
- NRHP reference No.: 82000994
- CHISL No.: N1157
- BERKL No.: 40

Significant dates
- Added to NRHP: November 1, 1982
- Designated CHISL: November 1, 1982
- Designated BERKL: March 16, 1981

Boone's University School is a historic building at 2029 Durant Avenue in Berkeley, California, U.S. It is the last surviving building from the Boone's University School for Boys, which closed in 1915. It is listed on the National Register of Historic Places since November 1, 1982; listed as a California Historical Landmark since November 1, 1982; and listed as a Berkeley Landmark since March 16, 1981.

Since 2000, the building has been home to the Persian Center, a cultural and heritage organization for the Iranian diaspora and Iranian Americans.

== History ==
The building is a boxy 3-story, 20 room house, in an Italianate style that was simplified. The Boone's University School for Boys (sometimes referred to as Boone's Academy) building is an example of the late 19th-century private academies that flourished in California. The school was founded by Philip Riley Boone (1851–1912), who bought the unfinished one story building in 1884 and moved in his existing school. His school was successful enough to add two more floors to the building a few years later in 1891. A 1903 state law change signaled the end of the 19th century academy boom in California.

The building had remained in the Boone family as a rooming house until 1980.

== See also ==
- List of Berkeley Landmarks in Berkeley, California
- California Historical Landmarks in Alameda County
- National Register of Historic Places listings in Alameda County
