= Robert Sibley =

Professor of mechanical engineering at the University of California, Berkeley

- Born: March 28, 1881; Round Mountain, Alabama
- Died: July 22, 1958 (aged 77); Dinan, France
- Education: University of California, Berkeley
- Occupation: Engineer
- Parent(s): Robert P. Sibley and Susie B. Sibley
- Relatives: Carol Sibley (spouse)
- Awards: Senate Commendation

Robert Sibley (March 28, 1881-July 22, 1958) was a professor at the University of California, Berkeley, where he also directed its alumni association. He also helped found the East Bay Regional Park system. One of its parks is named after him, the Robert Sibley Volcanic Regional Preserve. He was also prominent nationally as a leader of alumni associations. Since 1929, the Robert Sibley Magazine of the Year Award has honored excellence in alumni magazines.

== Biography ==
Robert Sibley born on March 28, 1881, in Round Mountain, Alabama. He was the fourth son of Robert Pendleton Sibley (born 17 Feb. 1848) and Susie B. Sibley (née Susie Wheless Bolling, 19 Jan. 1851). His siblings were Bolling (b. 1873), Francis Wheless (b. 1875), George Royal (b. 1879), and Herbert (b. 1885).

Sibley graduated from the University of California in 1903. For a time, Sibley served as editor of the Journal of Electricity. Sibley was a professor of mechanical engineering at the University of California, Berkeley, an executive manager of the California Alumni Association (1923-1949), and director and president of the East Bay Regional Park District (1948-1958).

When the local water district announced its plans to sell a great deal of land in the East Bay hills in 1929, it was reported that Sibley "went right down to city officials and said, 'these valuable pieces of land ought to be preserved forever'". Sibley, then executive manager of the California Alumni Association, recruited other civic leaders to the cause of preservation, and "immediately enlisted Hollis Thompson, Berkeley City Manager, to organize the East Bay Regional Parks Association".

Robert Sibley was married to Carol Sibley (née Rhodes) from 6 December 1943 until his death in 1958.

Sibley lived for many years in a house in Berkeley known as Allanoke Manor.

In 1948, Sibley spearheaded the California Alumni Association's acquisition of land near Mount Shasta for a new alumni family camp, the Lair of the Golden Bear. More than 1,000 alumni attended the camp's first season, and in 1949 it moved to a permanent site in Pinecrest, California, where it continues to operate.

When Sibley retired on 30 June 1949 as manager of the California Alumni Association, the California State Senate passed a resolution commending him for his service, and noting the growth in membership of the alumni association.

In 1958, when Robert and Carol Sibley were traveling together in France, Robert died unexpectedly of a heart attack in Dinan, France. His remains were cremated in Paris, and returned to California. Robert Sibley died on July 22, 1958.

== Works ==
- Sibley, Robert; Sibley, Carol (2010). University Of California Pilgrimage: A Treasury Of Tradition, Lore And Laughter. Kessinger Publishing, LLC. ISBN 978-1163820636. OCLC 2939223. (Kessinger Legacy Reprint, 2010; originally published by Lederer, Street & Zeus Co., 1952)
- Obata, Chiura; Calkins, William Frederick; Sibley, Robert (1939). The seasons at California. California Monthly. OCLC 21656997.
- Sibley, Robert (1937). The Golden Book of California, a Record of the First Seventy-Five years in the life of the University of California. Berkeley, CA: California Alumni Association. OCLC 977633107.
- Sibley, Robert; University of California, Berkeley, eds. (1928). The Romance of the University of California. H.S. Crocker Company, Inc., for the University of California Alumni Association. OCLC 187480513.
