= Edward F. Niehaus House =

Historic home in Berkeley, California

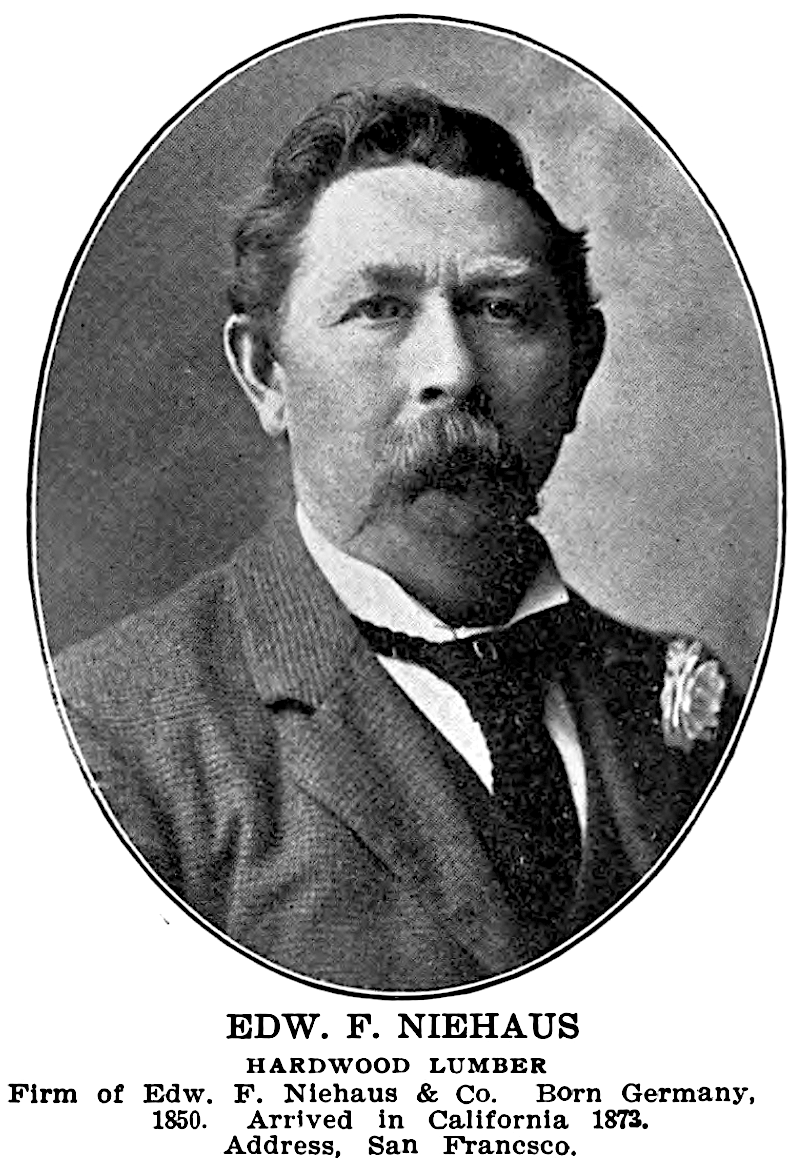
- Edward F. Niehaus, c. 1901

- Location within Oakland, California Location within California
- 37.862094°N 122.295211°W
- Location: 839 Channing Way, Berkeley, California, U.S.

History
- Built: 1889
- Built for: Edward F. Niehaus

Berkeley Landmark
- Designated: June 21, 1976
- Reference no.: 11

The Edward F. Niehaus House is a historic private residence built in 1889 in the West Berkeley neighborhood of Berkeley, California, U.S. It is listed by the city as a Berkeley Landmark (no.11), since June 21, 1976.

== History ==
It was built for Edward F. Niehaus (1852–1910), a German-born lumber businessman, who was active in local politics and was elected to the Berkeley Board of School Directors.

The Edward F. Niehaus House was built in 1889, in an Stick-Eastlake style with decorative relief patterns. It is considered as "West Berkeley’s grandest surviving Victorian residence". Between 1890 and 1892, Niehaus built seven additional speculative wooden houses on the same block, and the "Niehaus Bros. West Berkeley Planing Mill"; but unfortunately fires destroyed all of them.

== See also ==
- List of Berkeley Landmarks in Berkeley, California
- Concatenated Order of Hoo-Hoo
