= Round Mountain, Alabama =

Round Mountain
- Unincorporated community
- Location in Alabama.
- Coordinates: 34°12′56″N 85°41′02″W
- Country: United States
- State: Alabama
- County: Cherokee
- Elevation: 577 ft (176 m)
- Time zone: UTC-6 (Central (CST))
  - Summer (DST): UTC-5 (CDT)
- Area codes: 256 & 938
- GNIS feature ID: 125974

Round Mountain is an unincorporated community in Cherokee County, Alabama, United States. For a short period, it was an incorporated community beginning in 1908, and was listed in the 1910 U.S. Census as having 210 residents. That technically and briefly made it the largest town in Cherokee County, as neither the county seat of Centre nor Cedar Bluff returned census figures.

== History ==
A post office called Round Mountain was established in 1873, and remained in operation until it was discontinued in 1960. The community was centered on the Round Mountain blast furnace. The furnace first opened in 1852 and averaged 11 tons of iron manufactured per week. It was the first furnace in Alabama to use red iron ore to produce iron. The furnace was partially destroyed by Major General Francis Blair in 1864. It continued operation until closing in 1906.

== Demographics ==
Historical population
Census	Pop.	Note	%±
1910	210		—
U.S. Decennial Census

== Notable people ==
- Robert Sibley (1881-1958), mechanical engineer, alumni leader and founder of park system in California
