= Studio Building (Berkeley, California) =

- U.S. National Register of Historic Places
- Berkeley Landmark
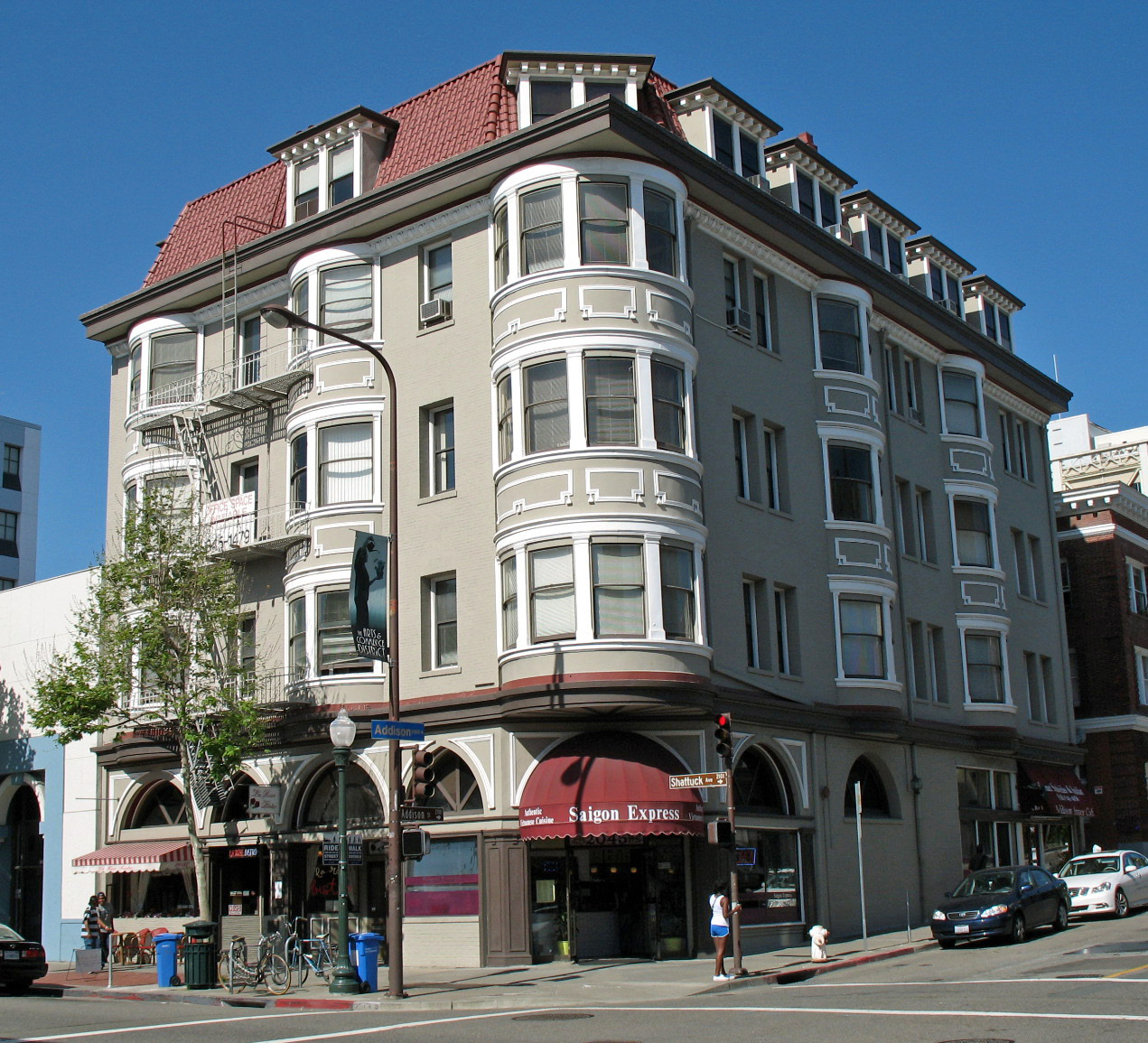

- Location within Oakland, California Location within California Location within the United States
- Location: 2045 Shattuck Ave., Berkeley, California
- Coordinates: 37°52′18.41″N 122°16′3.16″W
- Area: less than one acre
- Built: 1905
- NRHP reference No.: 78000645
- BERKL No.: 23

Significant dates
- Added to NRHP: April 6, 1978
- Designated BERKL: May 15, 1978

The Studio Building is a historic building, listed on the National Register of Historic Places, and located at 2045 Shattuck Avenue, Berkeley, California.

== Description and history ==
The Studio Building dates back to 1905. It stood as the tallest building in downtown Berkeley in the time of its construction. It was built by Frederick H. Dakin for use by his real estate investment company. The architect was probably Clarence Dakin.

The top floor of the building was designed as artists' studios and included a gallery space. The building was the original location of the California College of the Arts, founded by Frederick Meyer in 1907. The school, known originally as the School of the California Guild of the Arts and Crafts, moved to larger quarters after its first year. Other early tenants of the building included architect John Hudson Thomas, painters Henry J. Breuer and Evelyn A. Withrow, and photographers Oscar Maurer and Edwin James McCullagh. A school of performing arts opened there in 1910.

The building is five stories tall and built of masonry with a tiled mansard roof and rounded upper floor window bays. The first-floor bays, used as shop fronts, were originally built in the form of a series of alternating rounded and pointed arches, although some of these have since been covered. The building's name is set into the tile floor at the entrance, with the image of an artist's palette created by Frederick's brother, the well-known artist Edwin Deakin. By the time of Frederick Dakin's death in 1917 the building was called the Berkeley Hotel. The building was restored in the late 1970s, and has been on the National Register of Historic Places since 1978.
