= Spenger's Fresh Fish Grotto =

Former restaurant in California, U.S. (1890–2018)

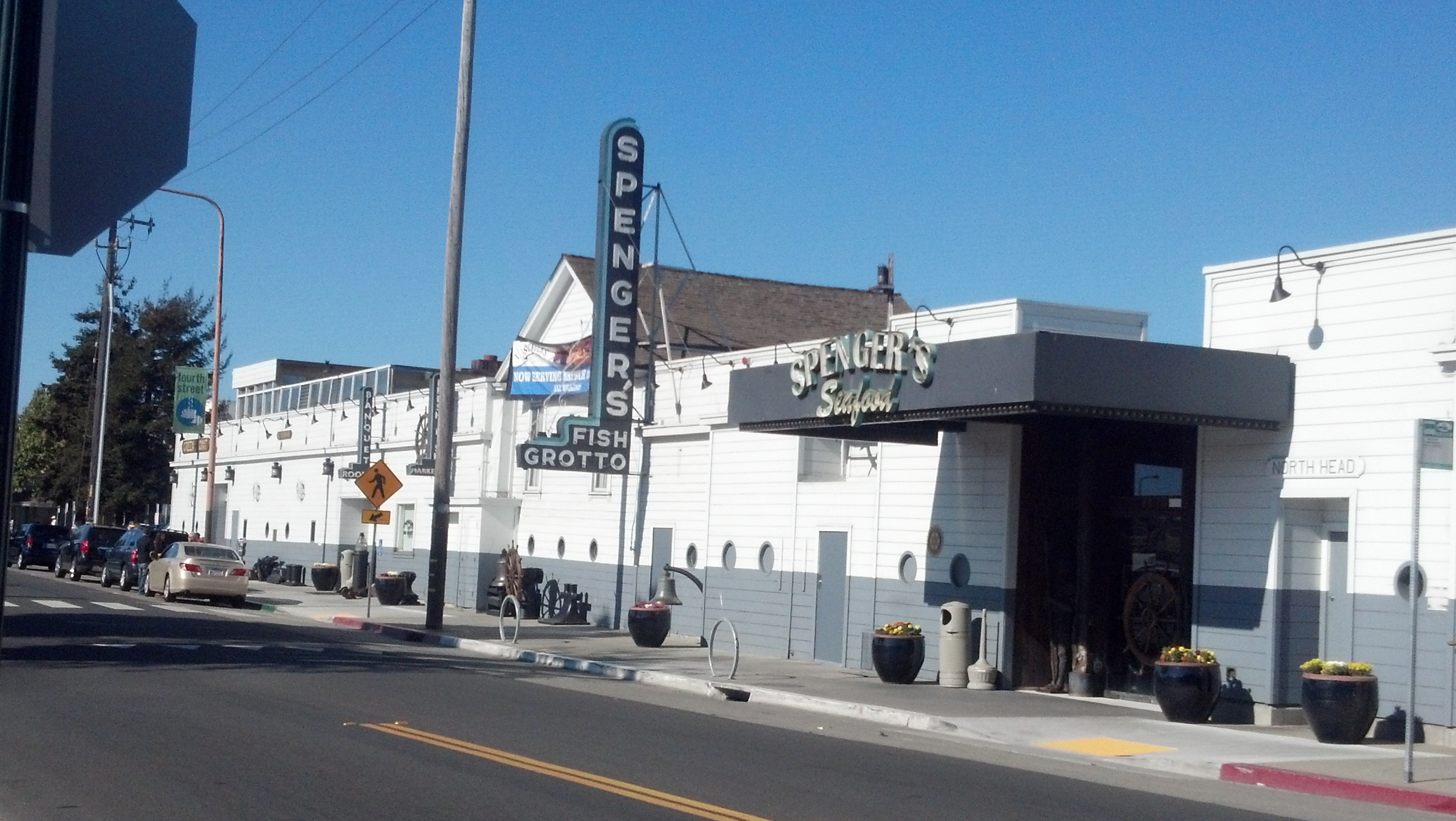
- Spenger's Fresh Fish Grotto, historic seafood restaurant.
- Interactive map of Spenger's Fresh Fish Grotto

Restaurant information
- Established: 1890
- Closed: October 2018
- Location: 1919 4th Street, Berkeley, California, United States
- Coordinates: 37°52′06″N 122°17′59″W

Spenger's Fresh Fish Grotto is a historic building and was a seafood restaurant active from 1890 to 2018, at 1919 4th Street in Berkeley, California. The building was listed as a Berkeley Landmark on November 2, 1998. A historic plaque was formally installed at the entrance to the restaurant in 2004 by Berkeley Historical Plaque Project. It was also known as Spenger's Fish Grotto.

== Early years ==
Johann Spenger emigrated to California from Bavaria and settled in West Berkeley in the 1860s. The original building housed Spenger's business and family residence. Johann Spenger worked as a hook and line fisherman on Lake Merritt in the early days. The restaurant began as a clam stand in 1890. The menu originally included clam chowder, baked beans, fish dinners and ten-cent beer.

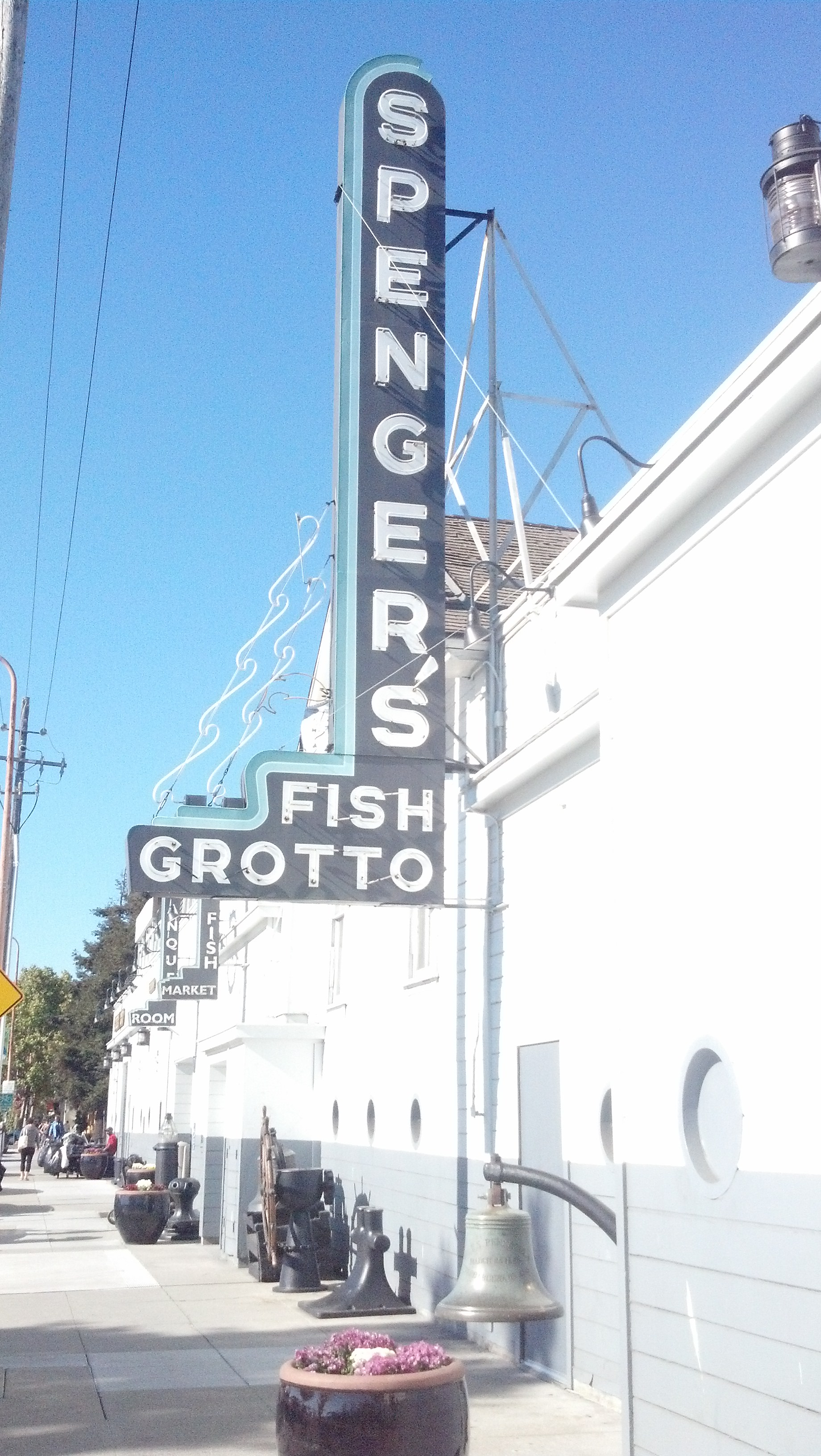
Sign in front of restaurant (2013)

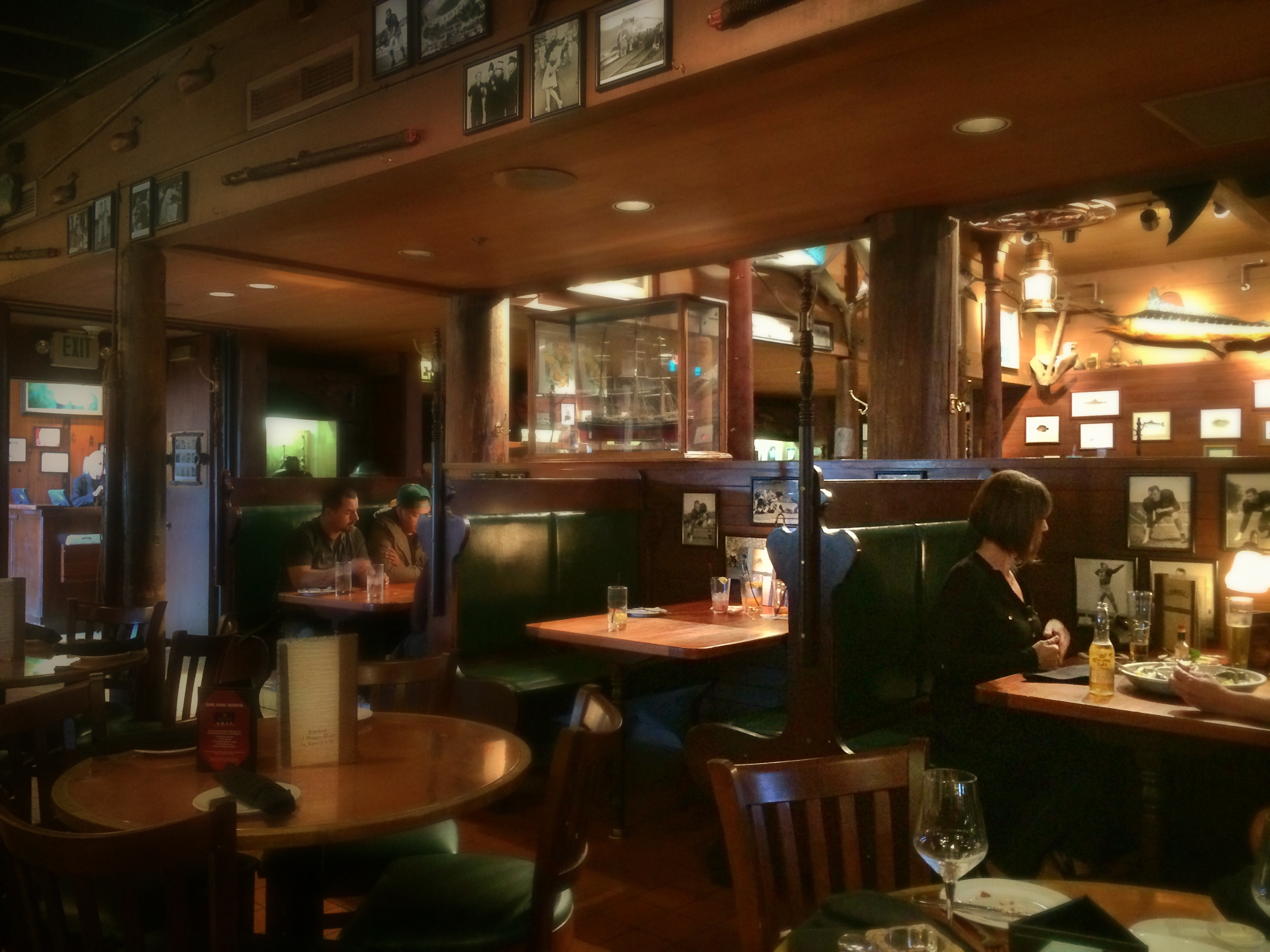
Interior of Spenger's (2015)

== Expansion ==
Johann Spenger's son Frank A. Spenger Sr. (1890–1973) opened a full-service restaurant on the ground floor of the original building in the 1930s. Eventually, dining rooms and bars were added as part of the expansion process as popularity of the restaurant grew. Celebrities enjoyed dining at Spenger's along with local residents. Frank Spenger was also a fisherman.

Frank's son, Frank "Buddy" Spenger Jr. (1916–2003) was the family member who really made the restaurant famous. He managed the business from 1940 through 1999. The restaurant had a major renovation and expansion in 1941 that included the creation of the Nautical Room. The restaurant's walls and floors were said to have been salvaged from two vessels, the SS Encinal and the SS Lurline. The bar was made of koa wood from Hawai'i. "By the '50s, Spenger's claimed to serve roughly 3,500 pounds of fish daily, more than any restaurant west of the Mississippi. The breakfast and dinner menu items at Spenger's Fresh Fish Grotto stopped changing after 1950. Some menu items included the "Captain's Plate", "Shrimp Scatter", salmon with egg sauce, baked salmon fillet with tomato sauce, Hangtown fry (eggs, oysters, and bacon dish), and shrimp omelet.

For years it paid more in taxes to Berkeley than any other restaurant." At the age of 83 in 1998, Buddy Spenger sold the business to McCormick & Schmick's a seafood restaurant chain based in Portland, Oregon.

== Renovation ==
After the restaurant was sold to McCormick & Schmick's, the facility was closed for a year until late 1999, as it underwent a $5 million renovation. Part of the renovation included replacing the original 1930s electrical system and retrofitting unreinforced brick walls with steel beams to comply with California's earthquake prevention standards. The kitchen received the greatest attention during this process, as it was gutted and expanded with all new appliances.

The interior of the restaurant continued to contain historical maritime memorabilia collected by the Spenger family, such as mounted fish, ship wheels, anchors, rigging, paintings, portholes, rudders, steering wheels, hawsers, crab pots, nets, and historical photographs.

== Closure and auction ==
The restaurant abruptly closed in October 2018, after 128 years of operations. After the restaurant closure, many of the unusual and rare decorative antiques and objects from in the interior of the restaurant went up for auction in 2019, including a 8 feet (2.4 m) tall Japanese Meiji era enamel vase from the 1893 World’s Columbian Exposition held in Chicago. The auction also included the "Star of Denmark," a 34.28-carat yellow diamond. The "Star of Denmark" was allegedly found in 1885 in the Kimberley mines in North Cape, South Africa that was once gifted from Alexandra of Denmark to Queen Kapi'olani of Hawaii after the Golden Jubilee of Queen Victoria (1887); however the story of this diamond has some variations, and the authenticity of the story has been questioned by historians. Also auctioned was some one hundred items from the Spenger family’s collection of maritime objects.

== See also ==
- List of seafood restaurants
