= Masonic Temple (Berkeley, California) =

- U.S. National Register of Historic Places
- Berkeley Landmark
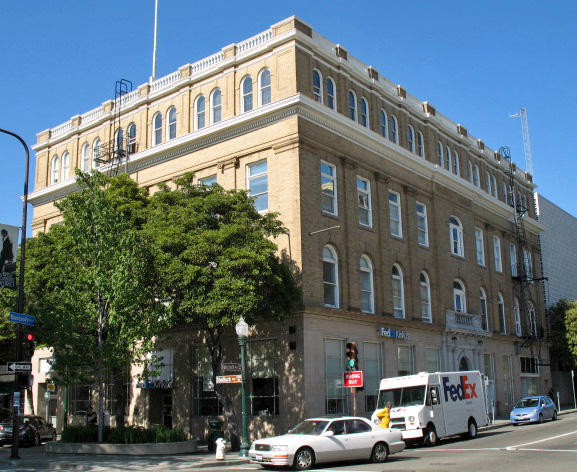

- Location within Oakland, California Location within California Location within the United States
- Location: 2105 Bancroft Way and 2295 Shattuck Ave., Berkeley, California
- Coordinates: 37°52′5″N 122°15′58″W
- Area: 0.2 acres (0.081 ha)
- Built: 1905
- Architects: Wharff, William H.
- Architectural style: Classical Revival
- NRHP reference No.: 82002162
- BERKL No.: 51

Significant dates
- Added to NRHP: July 15, 1982
- Designated BERKL: January 20, 1982

The Masonic Temple in Downtown Berkeley, California is a historic building listed on the National Register of Historic Places. It is located at 2105 Bancroft Way at the corner of Shattuck Avenue, just one block west of the University of California, Berkeley. The Classical Revival style building, designed by William H. Wharff, was built in 1905. The building was built for Berkeley's Masons, who started a local lodge in 1882 and formed the Berkeley Masonic Temple Association to build the temple. In 1944, the building was converted to a bank. The ground floor of the building was unoccupied and the remaining floors were used by University staff, including the California Center for Innovative Transportation and the National Writing Project.

The building was added to the National Register on July 15, 1982.

After a full renovation in 2019, the building has taken on new tenants. As of April 2023, the ground floor is partially occupied by a yoga studio. Haas School of Business occupies the second floor, and the third and fourth floors were occupied by Grabango, a Berkeley-based frictionless checkout technology startup from 2019 until March 2024.

== See also ==
- Freemasonry
- Sigma Phi Society of the Thorsen House
