= Berkeley Day Nursery =

Historic place in Berkeley, California

- U.S. National Register of Historic Places
- Berkeley Landmark
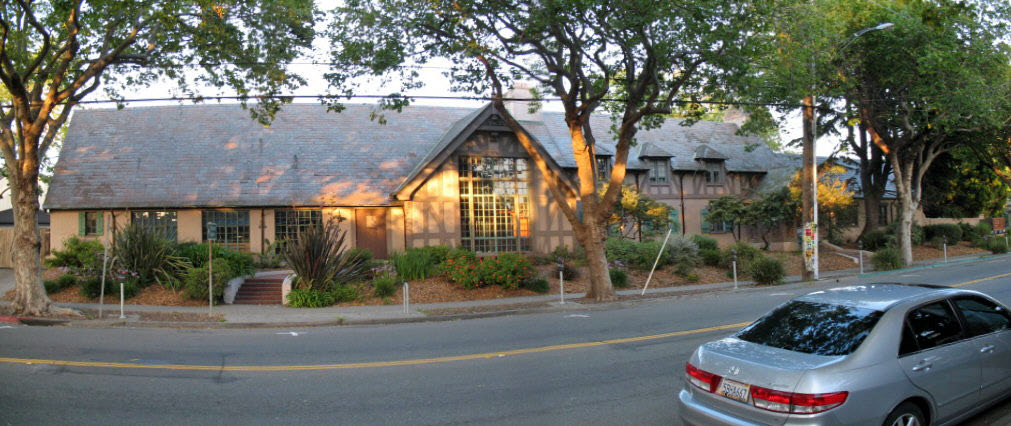
- Berkeley Day Nursery

- Location within Oakland, California Location within California Location within the United States
- Location: 2031 6th Street, Berkeley, California
- Coordinates: 37.867222°N 122.297222°W
- Built: 1927; 99 years ago
- Architects: Walter H. Ratcliff, Jr.
- Architectural style: English Cottage
- NRHP reference No.: 77000281
- BERKL No.: 18

Significant dates
- Added to NRHP: September 15, 1977
- Designated BERKL: February 22, 1977

Berkeley Day Nursery is a historical English Cottage building in Berkeley, California. The Berkeley Day Nursery Building was built in 1927. The building was listed on the National Register of Historic Places on September 15, 1977. The Berkeley Day Nursery Building was designed by Walter H. Ratcliff Jr. for the group of social active Berkeley women. The group was founded in 1908 to offer low cost day care for children of low-income working mothers. The first, 1908 building used by the group was a block from the historical building. Walter H. Ratcliff Jr. donated his time to design the 1927 building, noted for its woodwork. The Berkeley Day Nursery closed in 1965, not able to meet new codes. It opened as the West Berkeley Children's Center till 1976. In 1976 the building was converted to an office building, then a community health clinic.

== See also ==
- National Register of Historic Places listings in Alameda County, California
