= Hearst Gymnasium for Women =

Historic place in Berkeley, California

- U.S. National Register of Historic Places
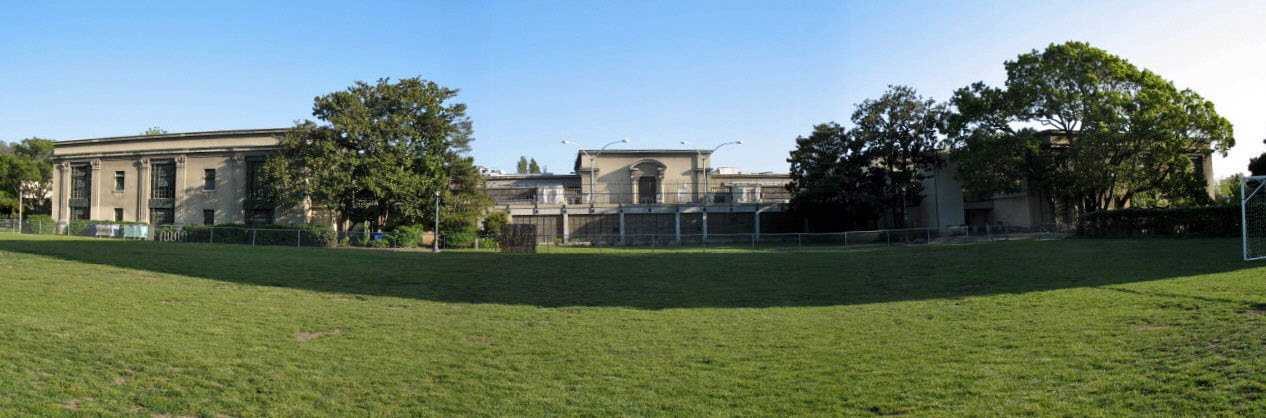
- Hearst Gymnasium for Women

- Location within Oakland, California Location within California Location within the United States
- Location: Bancroft Way, Berkeley, California
- Coordinates: 37.869400°N 122.256800°W
- Built: 1927; 99 years ago
- Architects: Bernard Maybeck and Julia Morgan
- NRHP reference No.: 82004645
- Added to NRHP: March 25, 1982

Hearst Gymnasium for Women, now called the Hearst Memorial Gymnasium, is a historical building in Berkeley, California. The Hearst Gymnasium for Women was built in 1927. The building and it site was listed on the National Register of Historic Places on March 25, 1982. The Hearst Gymnasium for Women was designed by Bernard Maybeck and Julia Morgan. The Hearst Gymnasium for Women was named after Phoebe Apperson Hearst (1842–1919), the mother of William Randolph Hearst (1863–1951). William Randolph paid for the gymnasium building as a memorial to his mother. The gymnasium replaced the original gymnasium that was lost in 1922 fire. The original wooden gymnasium was called Hearst Hall designed by Maybeck. Hearst Gymnasium for Women operated as retreat center for women, as it also had fine lodging, a fine dining hall, social center and three outdoor swimming pools. The building also houses the Phoebe A. Hearst Museum of Anthropology. The gymnasium has: dance studios, classrooms, conference rooms, a large and small gymnasium. Next to the gymnasium are the Hearst Tennis Courts, Hearst North Field, and the Hearst Field Annex. When opened the gymnasium also had an indoor rifle range.

== Description ==
Hearst Gym, a long, two-story rectangular structure made of stuccoed reinforced concrete, is positioned along the east-west axis of the campus on Bancroft Way. Reflecting the eclectic Classic style of the École des Beaux-Arts, the building exudes a sense of symmetry and regularity. Its south elevation features three rectangular pavilions with uniform facades that project outward from the main structure. Elevated above street level, the south façade overlooks a terrace with a retaining wall adorned by a Classical balustrade and large urns in a free Classic style. A staircase descends from the sidewalk to the street, framed by low walls with rounded coping and a single urn. This design uniquely integrates the building with the street compositionally.

The pavilions include aedicules, while the building itself has a flat roof with a simple entablature and a slightly projecting cornice. The recessed parts of the facade contain four windows extending from the ground to the architrave, featuring small, square panes of glass set in bronze muntins, divided by a bronze frieze with Pompeian or Florentine decorations. These windows are further adorned with pairs of bronze colonettes. Above, fluted pilasters with composite capitals and plain bases support the window hoods.

On the main terrace level of the north elevation lies a large central pool flanked by open courtyards. Inside, there are six gymnasiums, offices, a library, and lounges arranged around the courtyards and pool. The pool court is surrounded by a low wall with a molded base, seat, and top, designed to hold plants. The ends of this wall are capped with monumental hollow pedestals featuring sculpted figures of dancing ladies with garlands. Topped with dentil cornices, these pedestals serve as planters for small trees. The central pavilion doorway, designed similarly to the windows, is flanked by low balustrades with statues and urns at the ends. This "stage-set" effect is enhanced by the absence of any equipment except a diving board. The east and west facades share similarities but are less prominent.

Despite some interior modifications, the architectural integrity of Hearst Gym remains intact.

== Significance ==
When it was designed and built, the Hearst Gymnasium for Women stood out as the premier recreational facility for women at any institution of higher education in the state. Its architectural significance is highlighted by its designers, two of California's foremost architects, Bernard Maybeck and Julia Morgan. The gymnasium embodies a romantic Classicism style akin to Maybeck’s renowned Palace of Fine Arts for the 1915 Pan-Pacific Exposition in San Francisco. The building also holds historical importance due to its connection with notable Californians Phoebe Apperson Hearst and her son, William Randolph Hearst, who dedicated the building as a memorial to his mother. It replaced the previous Hearst Hall, also designed by Maybeck, which was destroyed by fire in 1922. Hearst Gymnasium was envisioned as a comprehensive sanctuary for women, offering comfortable spaces for lounging, dining, and sleeping, catering especially to female students who commuted and spent long hours on campus. Upon its completion, it was reputed to be the largest and most advanced women's gymnasium in the nation. The facility's requirement of 325,000 gallons of water for its pools even led to the construction of a new water treatment system on Bancroft Way by the City of Berkeley.

== See also ==
- List of works by Julia Morgan
- List of Berkeley Landmarks in Berkeley, California
- National Register of Historic Places listings in Alameda County, California
