= Garfield Intermediate School =

Historic place in Berkeley, California

- Garfield Intermediate School; Berkeley Jewish Community Center
- U.S. National Register of Historic Places
- Berkeley Landmark
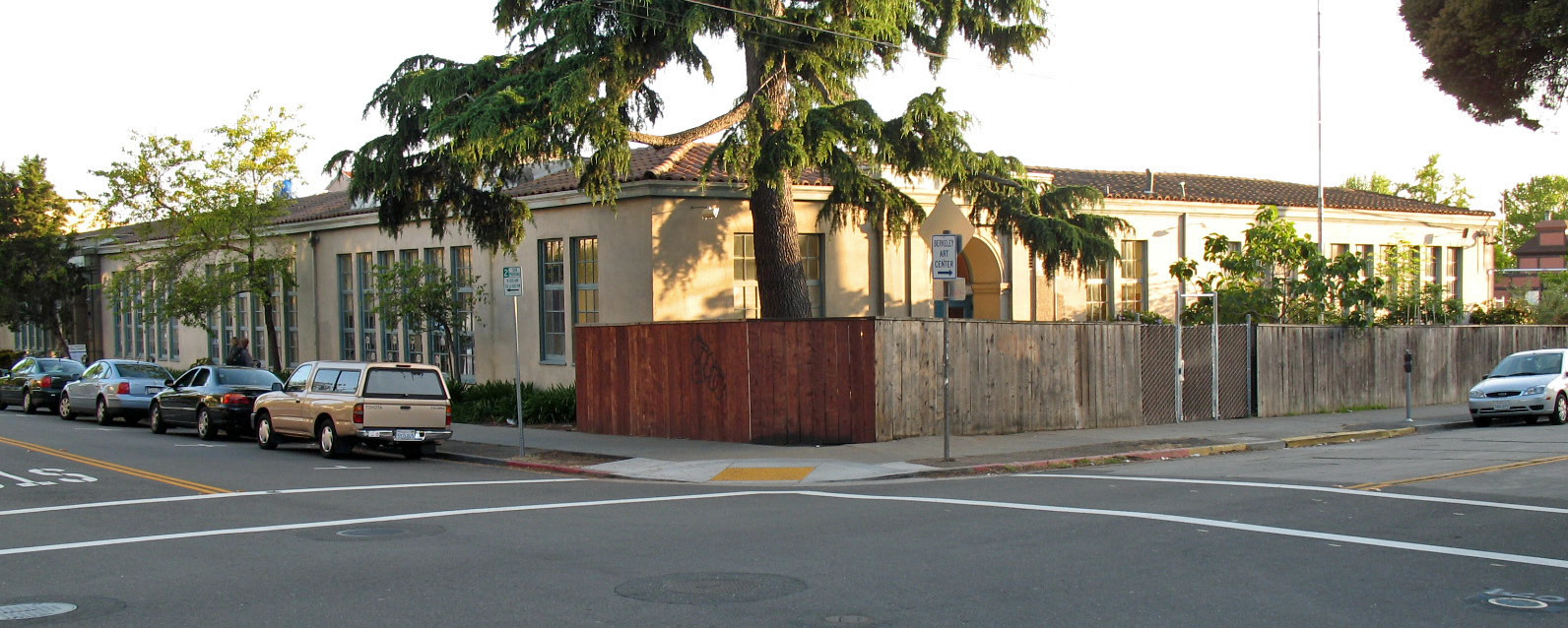
- Garfield Intermediate School; Berkeley Jewish Community Center, East Bay

- Location within Oakland, California Location within California Location within the United States
- Location: 1414 Walnut Street, Berkeley, California
- Coordinates: 37.881592°N 122.268733°W
- Built: 1915; 111 years ago
- Architect: Ernest Coxhead
- Architectural style: Mission Revival architecture
- NRHP reference No.: 82002160
- BERKL No.: 38

Significant dates
- Added to NRHP: June 14, 1982
- Designated BERKL: May 20, 1980

Garfield Intermediate School, also for sometime the Garfield Junior High School, now the Berkeley Jewish Community Center, East Bay is a historical building in Berkeley, California. The Garfield Intermediate School was built in 1915. The one-story Garfield Intermediate School building was listed on the National Register of Historic Places on June 14, 1982. The Garfield Intermediate School was designed by architect Ernest Coxhead in a Mission Revival architecture. The City of Berkeley built five schools in 1915, Garfield Intermediate School was one of the five. The school has enclosed class room courtyards, a 400-seat auditorium, French windows. Due to the courtyards and large French window, thee school was called a California outdoor school.

== See also ==
- National Register of Historic Places listings in Alameda County, California
- List of Berkeley Landmarks in Berkeley, California
