= Berkeley Piano Club =

Coordinates: 37.866537°N 122.252778°W

The Berkeley Piano Club was founded in 1893 by Berkeley women. In 1912 the club built a clubhouse designed by William L. Woollett with an internationally known performance space. It was designated by the city as a Berkeley Landmark in 2005. The designation also includes the house, final home of John Galen Howard (his wife was club president from 1911–1913), in an upstairs workshop of which a trigger was designed for the atomic bomb by a Manhattan Project scientist. The landmark designation made the property eligible for state funding and a restoration was also completed in 2005.

Nicolas Slonimsky lectured at the clubhouse in 1971.

The club published a history for its centennial, The Berkeley Piano Club: One Hundred Years of Harmony by Mary F. Commanday.
