= Berkeley Community Theater =

Theater in Berkeley, California, U.S.

- The "Bird Cage"
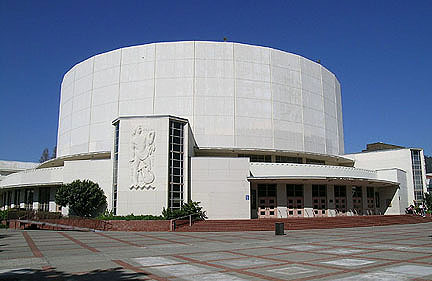

- Location within California
- Location: Berkeley, California, U.S.
- Coordinates: 37.86845°N 122.27147°W
- Owner: Berkeley Unified School District
- Capacity: 3,491
- Type: Theater

Construction
- Opened: 5 June 1950
Berkeley Community Theater
- Interactive map of Berkeley Community Theater
Berkeley Landmark
- Designated: December 7, 1992
- Reference no.: 179

Berkeley Community Theater is a theater located in Berkeley, California, United States, on the campus of Berkeley High School. The theater is administered by the Berkeley Unified School District. It is listed as a Berkeley Landmark (no. 179) since December 7, 1992. It is part of the Berkeley High School Campus Historic District, and the Berkeley Historic Civic Center District.

== Description ==
The theater building, a City of Berkeley Landmark since 1992, also holds the Florence Schwimley Little Theater, a smaller venue often used for Berkeley High School music and theater performances. The Art Deco-style theater has 3,491 seats, including a balcony section. A large stage is extended by an orchestra pit that can be raised or lowered.

== History ==
The theater was designed in 1938 and construction began in 1941, but was not completed until 1950, due to delays caused by World War II. Students attending Berkeley High during the war years often called it the "Bird Cage" since the exposed metal framework was a roost for many seagulls waiting for students to finish their lunches.

The theater was designed to house a theater organ, but one was not installed at the time of construction. In the 1980s, an organ was moved from the Paramount Theater in Toledo, Ohio and installed in the Berkeley Community Theater by the Nor-Cal Theater Organ Society. Now with 41 ranks (sets of pipes) and two fully functional 4-manual (four keyboards plus pedals) consoles, this Wurlitzer is one of the largest and finest in existence. It is maintained solely by the volunteer work of the Society.

Derek and the Dominos, Bruce Springsteen, Dido, Jimi Hendrix, Led Zeppelin, Paul Robeson, Dream Theater, Bob Dylan, Stan Getz, Joni Mitchell, Robin Trower, Frank Zappa, James Taylor, Richie Havens, Alice Cooper, Lenny Bruce, Harry Chapin, Elton John, David Bowie, Genesis, The Band, The Doors, King Crimson, The Clash, Elvis Costello, Van Morrison, The Kinks, Tangerine Dream, Humble Pie, The Tubes, Bay City Rollers, Peter Gabriel, Iggy Pop, and Iron Butterfly have played shows at the theater. Numerous albums have been recorded in the theater, including S&M by Metallica with the San Francisco Symphony.

The Grateful Dead played a total of twenty-four shows at the Community Theater, and Jerry Garcia another six times - two with the New Riders of the Purple Sage, two with Merl Saunders, one with Maria Muldaur and one acoustic show with John Kahn.

Famous speakers have included the Dalai Lama, Lenny Bruce, Bernie Sanders, Maya Angelou, Timothy Leary, Lawrence Ferlinghetti, Al Franken, and Amy Goodman.

== Funding and renovations ==
The citizens of Berkeley have directed funds towards the theater on numerous occasions. Berkeley voters passed measure AA in 2000, allocating around $15 million to the theater for renovation. These funds were later taken to build the new administration building at Berkeley High School. A few of the funds came back into the building in renovating the fire alarm system. During this process the grand curtain was damaged. It was finally replaced as well as all other soft goods in July 2009.

In the spring of 2010, a new sound system was installed in the theater.

Major renovations began in July 2020 with funding from a 2010 school facilities bond measure.
