= College Women's Club =

- U.S. National Register of Historic Places
- Berkeley Landmark
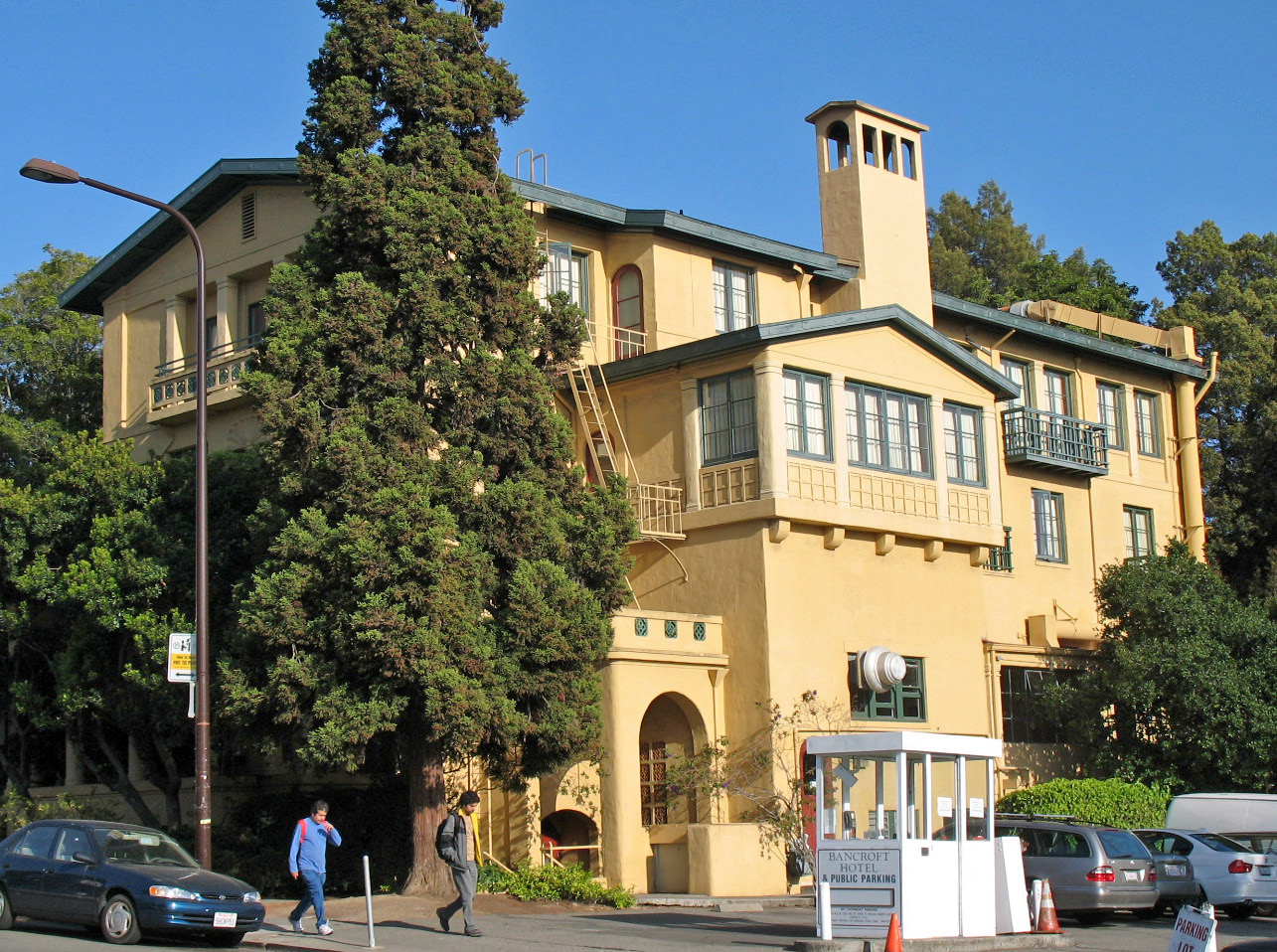

- Location within California Location within the United States
- Location: 2680 Bancroft Way, Berkeley, California
- Coordinates: 37.869222°N 122.255514°W
- Built: 1936-37
- Architect: Walter T. Steilberg
- Architectural style: American Craftsman
- NRHP reference No.: 82002157
- BERKL No.: 33
- Designated BERKL: November 19, 1979

The College Women's Club was a women's club founded in 1920 based in Berkeley, California. It organized Berkeley's first cooperative day nursery and established scholarships.

== The building ==
The College Women's Club building was built by Walter T. Steilberg in 1928 in the American Craftsman style.

The College Women's Club sold the building and it was turned into a rooming house and a sorority. The building was restored in the early 1990s and then became the Berkeley Hotel.

The building, now the Berkeley Hotel, was designated a Berkeley Landmark by the city in 1979 and was listed on the National Register of Historic Places in 1982.
