= Manasse-Block Tanning Company =

American company

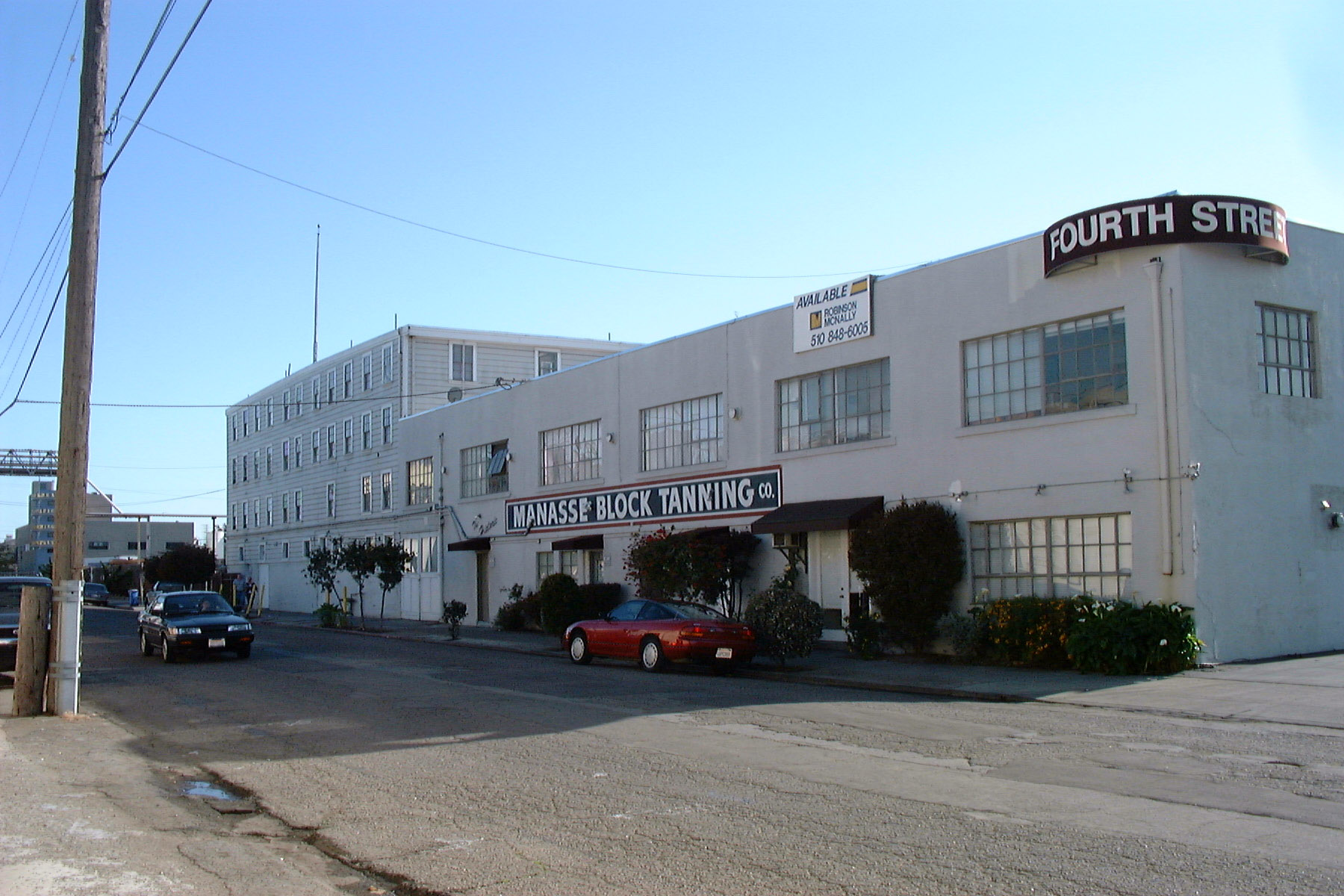
- Remaining manufacturing buildings, being used as stores and live/work units
- Location: 1300 Fourth Street, Berkeley, California, U.S.
- Founded: 1900 – 1986
- Founder: August Manasse, Roy Block

Berkeley Landmark
- Designated: April 21, 1986
- Reference no.: 101

The Manasse-Block Tanning Company was an American tannery founded in 1900 by August Manasse and Roy Block, whose families had leather-related businesses in Napa and San Francisco, California, respectively. The Manasse-Block tannery was relocated in 1905 from Oakland to 1300 Fourth Street in Berkeley, on a site previously used by the Deach Tannery. Manasse-Block remained in this location for 80 years, until it closed in 1986.

== History ==
The primary product of the tannery was boot and shoe leather. Raw cow hides were processed from start to finish on the site. However, towards the end of the factory's productive years, hides that had been processed elsewhere were finished on the site.

The site was designated a City of Berkeley Landmark on April 21, 1986. Utilizing the remaining seven structures, the property currently provides units for a small number of live/work spaces and various business establishments and remains one of the oldest intact industrial sites in the city. "The oldest buildings are on the south side of the property along Third Street and are heavy post-and-beam construction with six-over-six light windows and rustic overlapping wood siding."

Manasse-Block Tanning Company

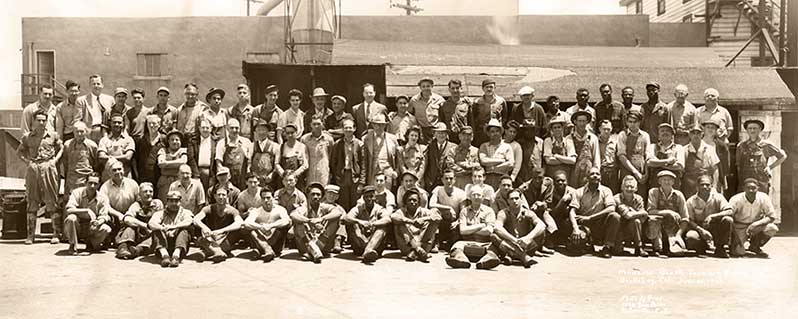
The entire factory and office staff as of June 26, 1947

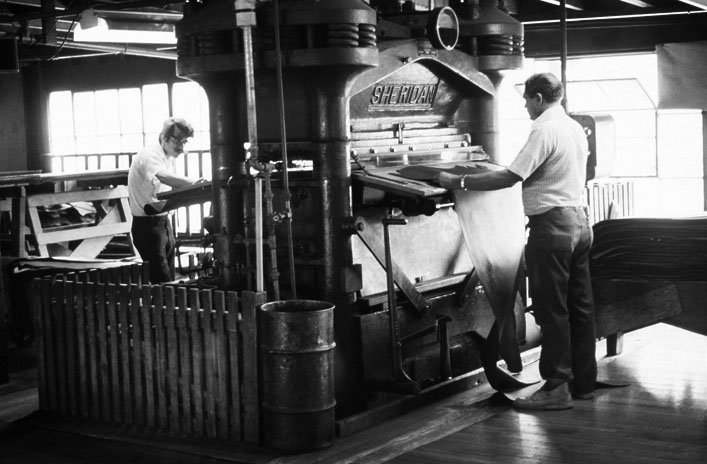
Two men pressing the leather near the end of the tanning process, October 1975

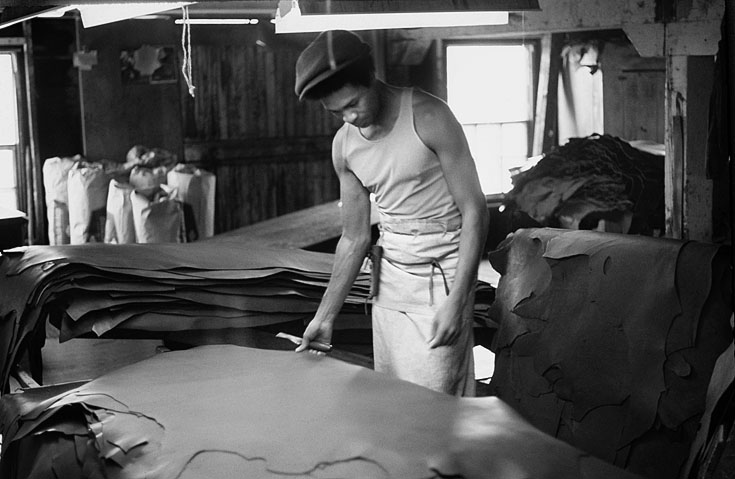
Finish grading the leather, October 1975

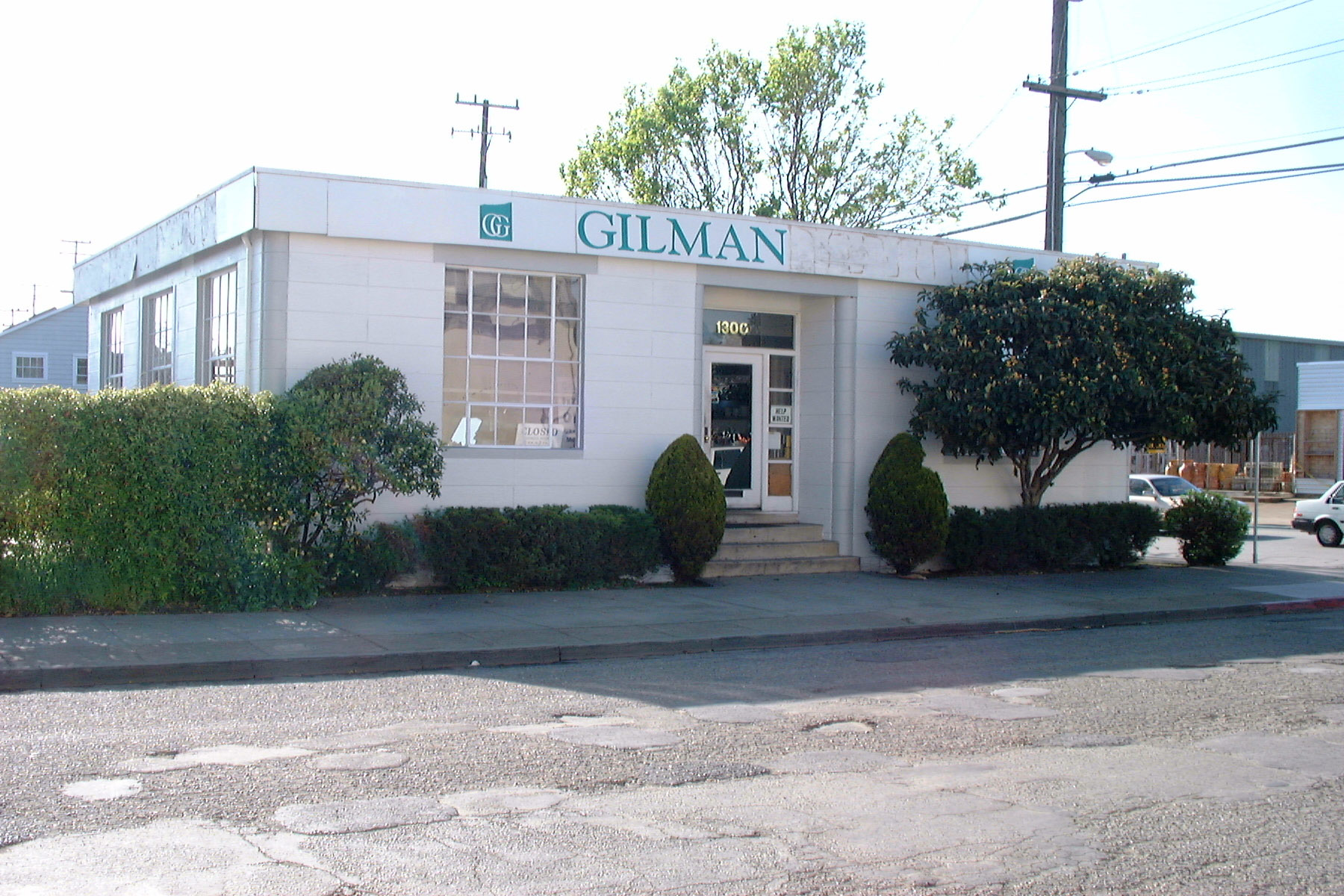
Former office building, later housed the Gilman Grill

== See also ==
- List of Berkeley Landmarks, Structures of Merit, and Historic Districts
- Tanning
- Leather
