= Piedmont Avenue (Berkeley) =

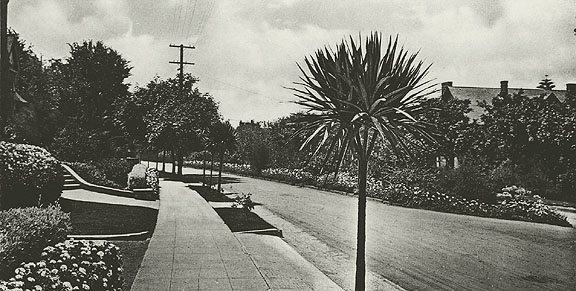
- Piedmont Avenue, 1915

- Location in Berkeley/the East Bay
- 37.867789°N 122.251889°W
- Location: Piedmont Ave. between Gayley Rd. and Dwight Way

History
- Built: 1865

Site notes
- Architect: Frederick Law Olmsted

California Historical Landmark
- Official name: Piedmont Way
- Reference no.: 986

Berkeley Landmark
- Official name: Piedmont Way
- Designated: February 22, 1990
- Reference no.: 130

Piedmont Avenue is a street in the city of Berkeley, California. Originally known as Piedmont Way, is the major street through the University of California, Berkeley's fraternity and sorority area. The street was originally named Piedmont Way.

Piedmont Way was conceived in 1865 by Frederick Law Olmsted, America's foremost landscape architect. As the centerpiece of a gracious residential community close beside the College of California, Olmsted envisioned a roadway that would follow the natural contours of the land and be sheltered from sun and wind by "an overarching bowery of foliage." This curvilinear, tree-lined parkway was Olmsted's first residential street design. It has served as the model for similar parkways across the US.

This original portion, now located between Gayley Road and Dwight Way, is designated as a Berkeley Landmark and California Historical Landmark. The road continues south to Webster Street.
