= South Berkeley Community Church =

Historic church in California, United States

- U.S. National Register of Historic Places
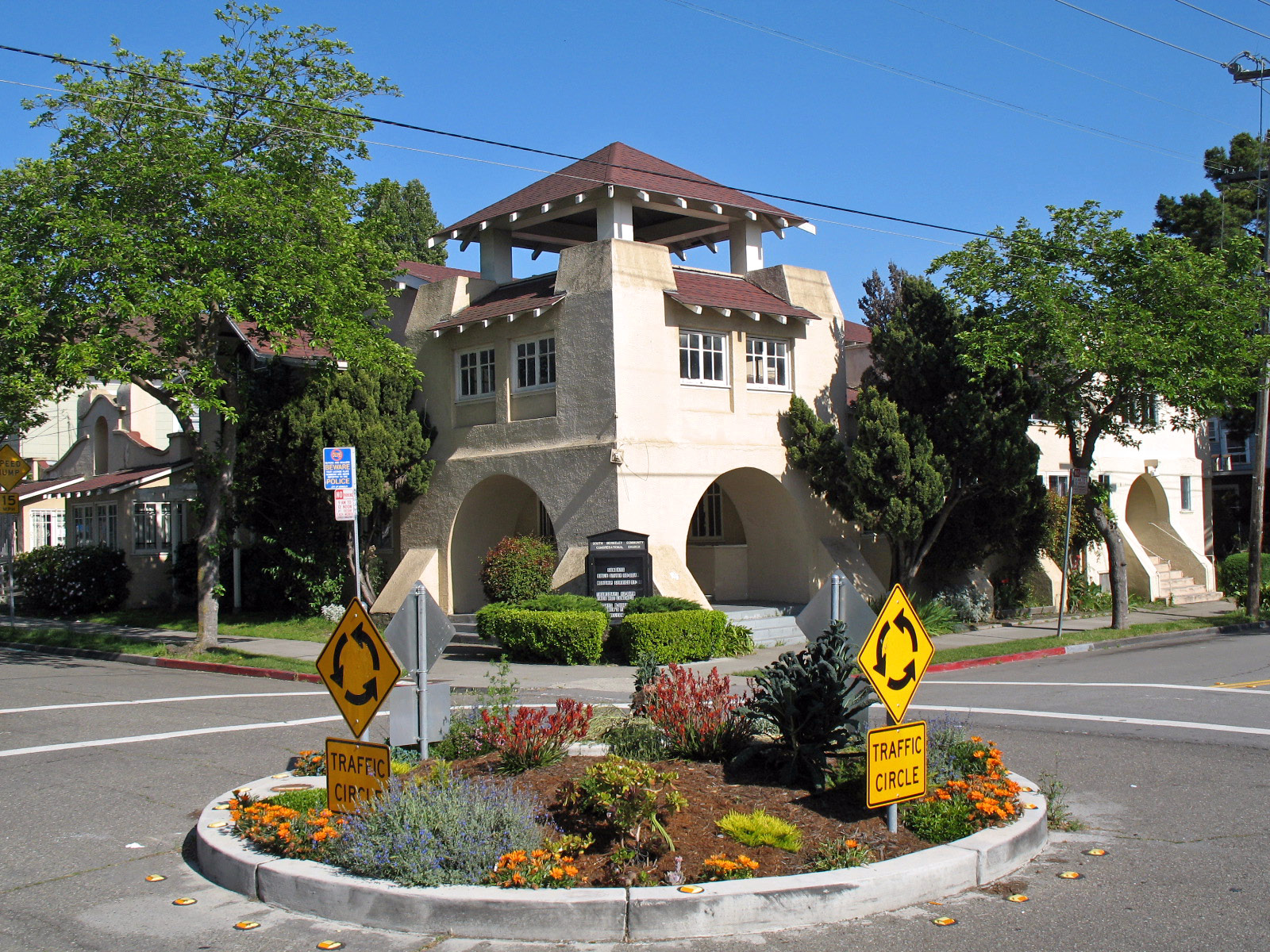

- Location within Oakland, California Location within California Location within the United States
- Location: 1802 Fairview St., Berkeley, California
- Coordinates: 37°51′2″N 122°16′17″W
- Area: less than one acre
- Built: 1943
- Built by: William Livingston
- Architect: Hugo W. Storch
- Architectural style: Mission/Spanish Revival
- NRHP reference No.: 07001176
- Added to NRHP: November 15, 2007

The South Berkeley Community Church is a historic church at 1802 Fairview Street in Berkeley, California. It was added to the National Register of Historic Places in 2007.

It was designed by architect Hugo W. Storch in a Mission/Spanish Revival style to serve as the Park Congregational Church. It was built in 1943.
