= Berkeley Architectural Heritage Association =

The Berkeley Architectural Heritage Association (BAHA) is a Berkeley, California, non-profit organization whose mission is to "promote, through education, an understanding and appreciation for Berkeley’s history, and to encourage the preservation of its historic buildings." Incorporated on 9 December 1974, the organization has been active since 1971. The organization is headquartered at the McCreary-Greer house, gifted to the association by Ruth Alice Greer in 1986.

In 2025, after developers applied to convert two smaller Berkeley buildings into large housing complexes, BAHA unsuccessfully tried to designate the two structures as landmarks. Housing developers said that the attempt caused costly delays to the construction process and that BAHA was attempting to prevent change.
