= John Hudson Thomas =

American architect

John Hudson Thomas (1878—1945) was an American architect, who practiced in Northern California.

== Biography ==
John Hudson Thomas was born in Nevada in 1878. His family relocated to the San Francisco Bay Area when he was still young. He attended Yale University, receiving an undergraduate degree in 1902, then received a graduate degree in architecture from the University of California, Berkeley (UCB) in 1904. From 1904 through 1906 Thomas worked in the architectural office of John Galen Howard, who had prepared the master plan for the UCB campus.

In 1907 Thomas entered a partnership with architect George Plowman, and they designed some 50 residential buildings in the Arts and Crafts style.

In 1910 Thomas established his own office, becoming one of the first tenants in the new Berkeley Studio Building, home of the Berkeley Arts and Crafts School. During this period he associated with architects Bernard Maybeck and Julia Morgan, whose ideas influenced his early work. As Thomas took on bigger and more prominent projects, his work became more orthodox, though he continued to have an inclination for interior architecture. He continued working until his death in 1945.

== Legacy ==
Thomas was a prominent member of the First Bay Tradition architectural school of thought. His reputation rests on the hundreds of homes that he designed for San Francisco and the Bay Area. His work is characterized by unorthodox blending of various historic styles including Craftsman, Prairie School, Mission, Gothic, Tudor, Art Nouveau, English Cottage, and in his later years Viennese Secessionist. Thomas operated from 1910 to 1945 throughout California with his work influencing residential development styles in the Bay Area throughout the 20th century.

== Notable works ==
- Chisholm House (Berkeley, 1907)
- Randall House (Berkeley, 1909)
- Pratt-Thomas House (Berkeley, 1911)
- W. L. Locke House (Oakland, 1911)
- Dungan House (Berkeley, 1911)
- Pratt-Verper House (Berkeley, 1911)
- Kay House (Berkeley, 1912)
- Tudor(esque) cottage (Berkeley)
- Spring Mansion (Berkeley, 1912–14)
- Wintermute House aka "The Rocks" (Berkeley, 1913)
- Sellander House (Berkeley, 1914)
- Park House (Berkeley, 1914)
- Kruse House (Berkeley, 1914)
- Antony House (1915)
- Ecole Bilingue (Berkeley, 1915)
- Captain Maury's Residence (1922, expansion of existing house)
- Blum House (Berkeley, 1926)
- Harris Avenue (El Cerrito, 1929)
- Hume Castle/Hume Cloister (Berkeley)
