= Campus of the University of California, Berkeley =

University campus in Berkeley, California

Coordinates: 37.87411°N 122.26217°W

The campus of the University of California, Berkeley, and its surrounding community are home to a number of notable buildings by early 20th-century campus architect John Galen Howard, his peer Bernard Maybeck (best known for the San Francisco Palace of Fine Arts), and their colleague Julia Morgan. Subsequent tenures as supervising architect held by George W. Kelham and Arthur Brown, Jr. saw the addition of several buildings in neoclassical and other revival styles, while the building boom after World War II introduced modernist buildings by architects such as Vernon DeMars, Joseph Esherick, John Carl Warnecke, Gardner Dailey, Anshen & Allen, and Skidmore, Owings and Merrill. Recent decades have seen additions including the postmodernist Haas School of Business by Charles Willard Moore, Soda Hall by Edward Larrabee Barnes, and the East Asian Library by Tod Williams Billie Tsien Architects.

Much of the UC Berkeley campus, including the major landmarks, is in the city limits of Berkeley. A portion of the UC Berkeley property extends into Oakland.

== Beginnings (1860–1900) ==
"... the fact will be observed that if the range of the eye is thus carried but to a certain distance, especially to the westward or southward, the view is everywhere exceedingly beautiful ... Even in stormy weather, there is great grandeur in the movements of the clouds rolling over their sombre slopes and declivities, and I remember a single scene of this kind as one of the most impressive I have ever witnessed. But on ordinary occasions the view to the westward ... is also one of peculiarly cheerful interest."

— Frederick Law Olmsted, Letter to S.H. Willey (1866)

The first 160 acres (65 ha) of farmland in Berkeley were acquired by the privately held College of California in 1858, and the site was dedicated on April 16, 1860. Frederick Law Olmsted was commissioned to design the campus in 1864. Olmsted's design followed the City Beautiful movement and was sensitive to the natural topography, including Strawberry Creek, which ran through the site, and proposed an east–west axis aligned with the Golden Gate. If Olmsted's plan had been implemented, the campus would consist of student villages for living and learning, linked by meandering paths and surrounded by parks. He praised the site's distance from burgeoning San Francisco, providing both "a suitable degree of seclusion and a suitable degree of association" with the cosmopolitan world. However, only "two considerable buildings would be required at [this] early period": a library and general assembly hall with classrooms. The first two common buildings, completed as North and South Hall in 1873, were built approximately where Olmsted had proposed.

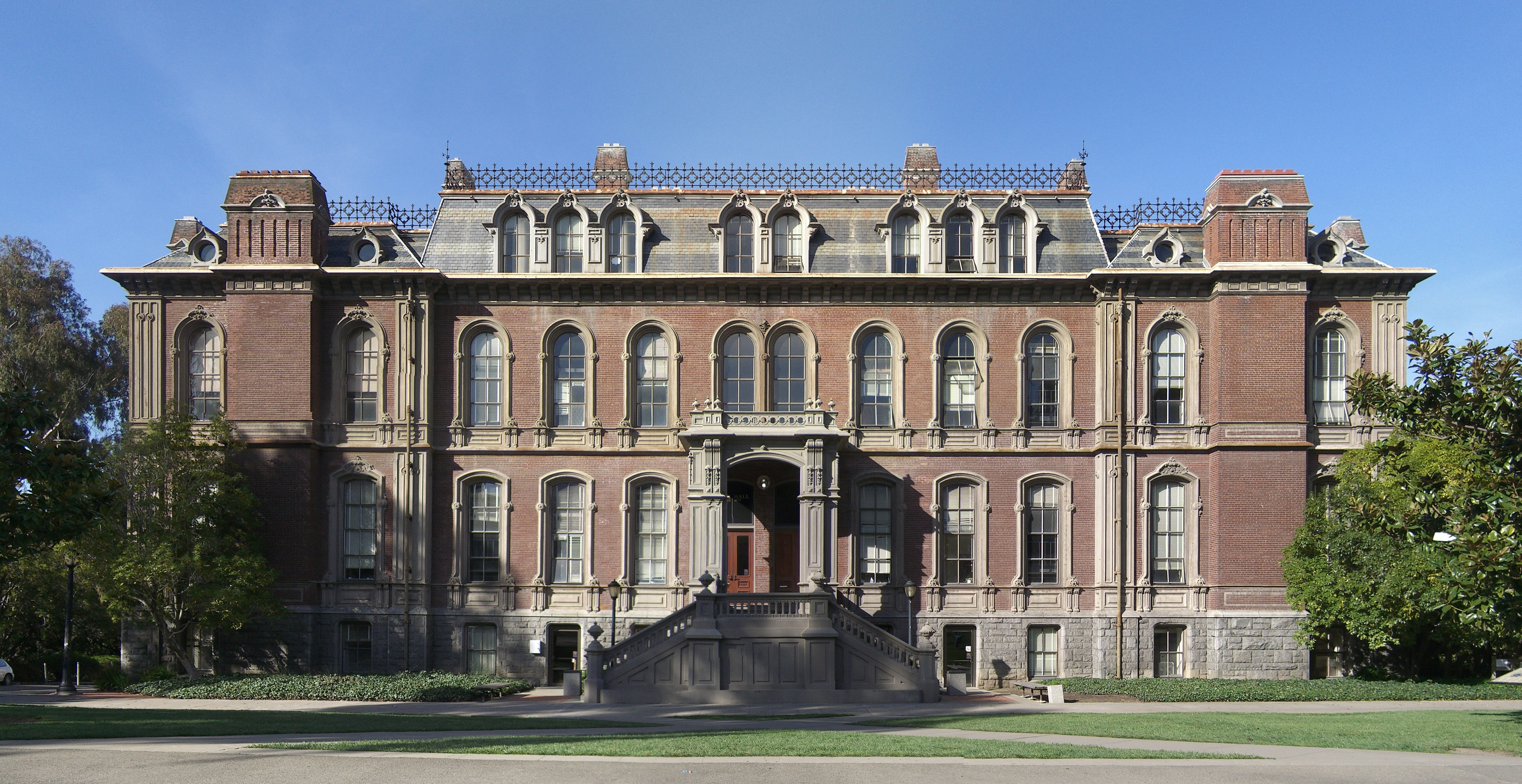
Built in 1873, South Hall is one of the few original buildings still standing on the Berkeley campus

After the College of California became the public University of California in 1868, Olmsted's plans were set aside as impractical (mainly parkland, with only two major buildings) in favor of new plans from David Farquharson in 1869, although these plans also were never fully implemented. Shortly after Daniel Coit Gilman was named the president of the University of California in 1872, William Hammond Hall wrote to Samuel F. Butterworth, a regent, and proposed to design the campus without remuneration for his services. Hall presented his final plan in February 1874; it was adopted and implemented slowly over the next twenty-five years, generally following Olmsted's ideas. Very little of these early University of California campus design implementations (c. 1868–1903) remain, with the Victorian Second Empire-style South Hall (1873, Kenitzer and Farquharson) and Piedmont Avenue (Olmsted) being notable exceptions.

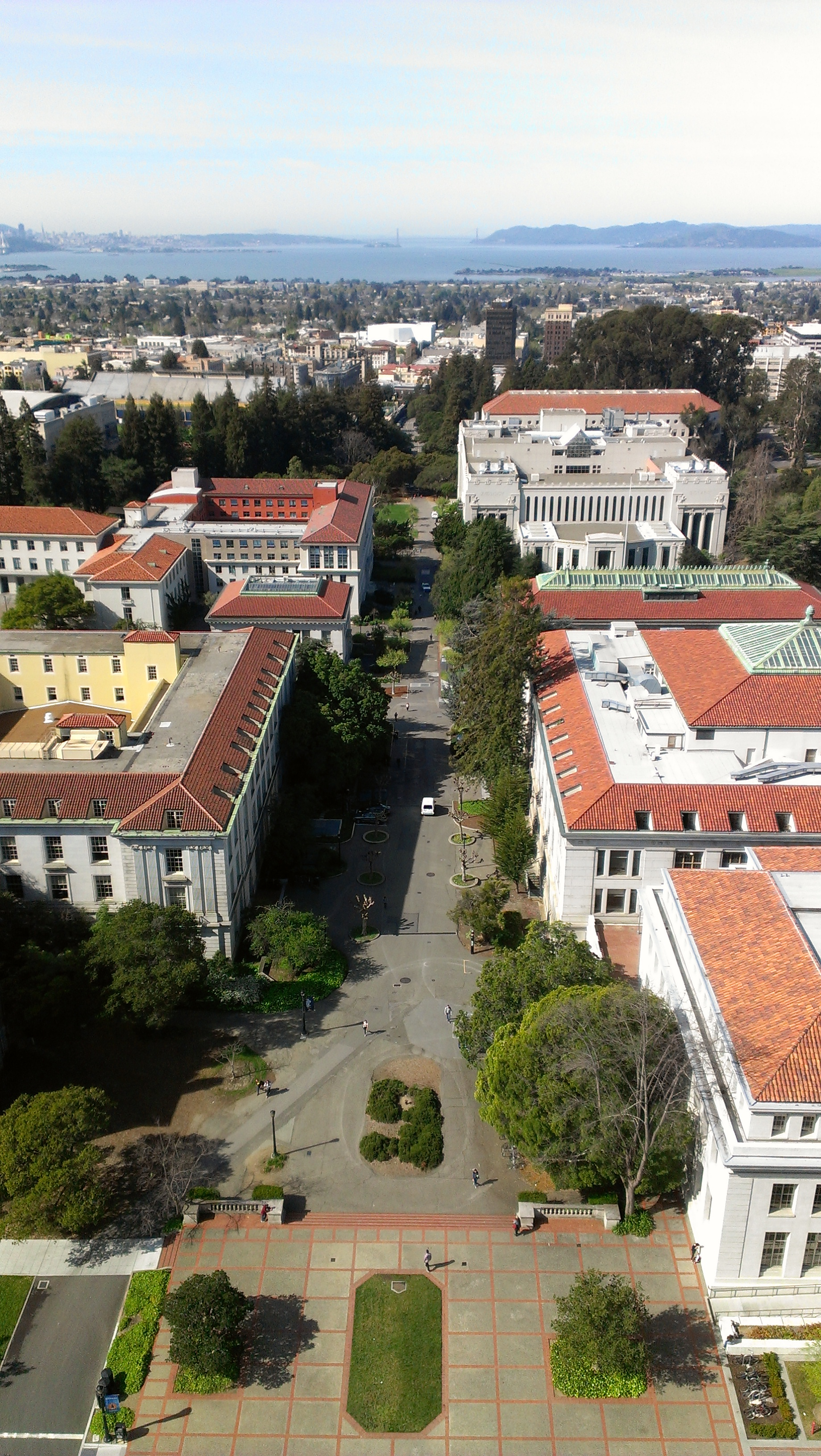
View west from Sather Tower towards the Golden Gate, along Campanile Way. Most of the visible buildings flanking this main east–west axis are in the "classic core" of the campus.

What is considered the historic campus today resulted from the 1898 "International Competition for the Phoebe Hearst Architectural Plan for the University of California," funded by the wealthy eponymous philanthropist mother of William Randolph Hearst and initially held in Antwerp; eleven finalists were judged again in San Francisco the next year. This unprecedented competition came about from one-upmanship between the prominent Hearst and Stanford families of the Bay Area. In response to the founding of Stanford University, the Hearst Family decided to "adopt" the fledgling University of California and develop their own world-class institution. Although Émile Bénard, a Frenchman, won the competition, he disliked the "uncultured" San Francisco atmosphere and refused to personally revise the plan to the site. He was replaced by fourth-place winner John Galen Howard, who would become UC Berkeley's resident campus architect in 1901. Only University House, designed by architect Albert Pissis and completed in 1911 as a residence for the President of the University of California, was placed according to the original Bénard plan; today it is the residence of UC Berkeley's Chancellor. However, the general campus orientation initially proposed by Olmsted and followed by his successors has persisted, with the main axis of the campus running uphill from west to east along what is now Campanile Way.

== Beaux-Arts era (1901–1950) ==
For the first half of the 20th century, Berkeley campus architecture was led by a series of three notable Bay Area architects famed for their work in San Francisco: John Galen Howard (1901–1924), George W. Kelham (1927–1936), and Arthur Brown, Jr. (1938–1948).

=== Howard designs the classical core ===
The oldest parts of the campus that remain were built in the Beaux-Arts Classical style in the early 1900s, which was the style preferred by John Galen Howard and Phoebe Hearst (who paid his salary). This area is now referred to as the "classical core" of the campus. Howard reoriented the main campus axis to its present-day alignment along Campanile Way, as a continuation of the line of Center Street. This divided the campus into four pieces: the park-like west side, as a buffer to the city of Berkeley; the central core, with its monumental buildings; the hilly east, "a majestic natural background and climax to the composition"; and the south, given to athletic pursuits. With the support of University President Benjamin Ide Wheeler, Howard designed more than twenty buildings, which set the tone for the campus up until its expansion in the 1950s and 1960s. These included the Hearst Greek Theatre (1903), California Hall (1905), the Hearst Memorial Mining Building (1907), Sather Gate (1908), Durant Hall (1911), Wellman Hall (1912), the 307-foot (94 m) Sather Tower (1914; nicknamed "the Campanile" after its architectural inspiration, St Mark's Campanile in Venice), Doe Memorial Library (1917), Gilman Hall (1917), Hilgard Hall (1917), Wheeler Hall (1917), California Memorial Stadium (1923), (Old) LeConte Hall (1923), Haviland Hall (1924), and Hesse Hall (1924). Buildings he regarded as temporary, nonacademic, or not particularly "serious" were designed in shingle or Collegiate Gothic styles, including North Gate Hall (1906), Dwinelle Annex (1920), and Stephens Hall (1923).

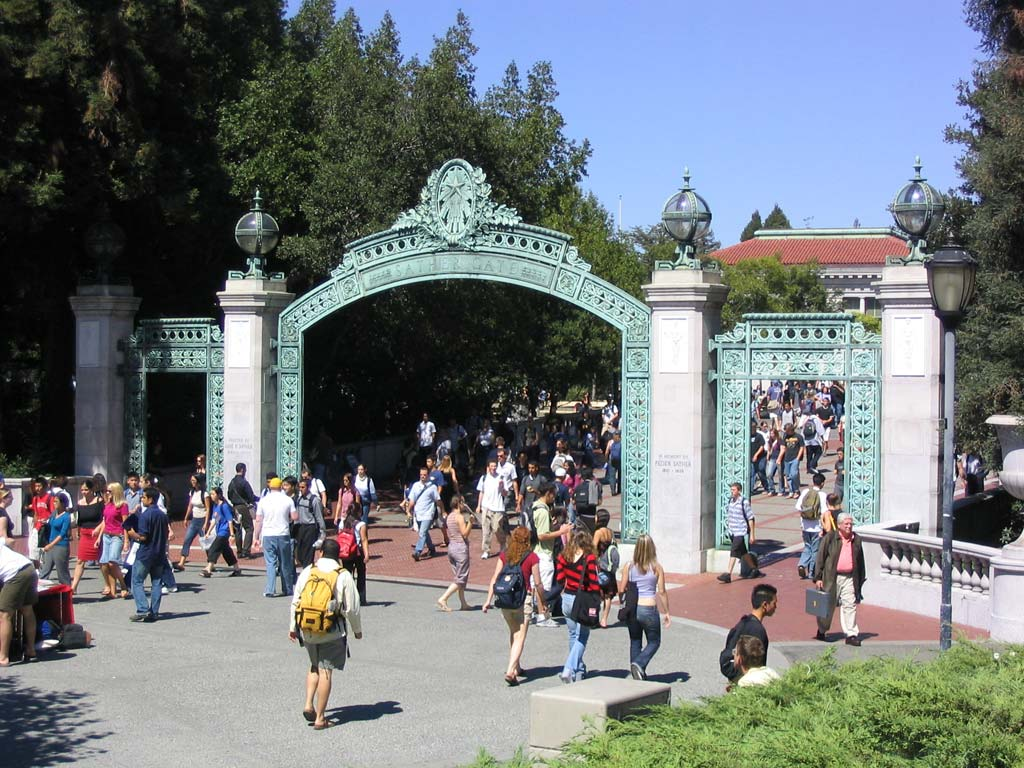
Sather Gate marks the original southern entrance to the campus, and now the entrance from Sproul Plaza

Multiple buildings and structures in the classical core are listed as a single aggregated California Historical Landmark (no. 946) and also are listed individually in the National Register of Historic Places:

- Founders' Rock
- University House
- Faculty Club and Glade
- Hearst Greek Theatre
- Hearst Memorial Mining Building
- Doe Memorial Library
- Sather Tower and Esplanade Hall
- Sather Gate and Bridge
- Hearst Gymnasium
- California Hall
- Durant Hall
- Wellman Hall
- Hilgard Hall
- Giannini Hall
- Wheeler Hall
- North Gate Hall
- South Hall

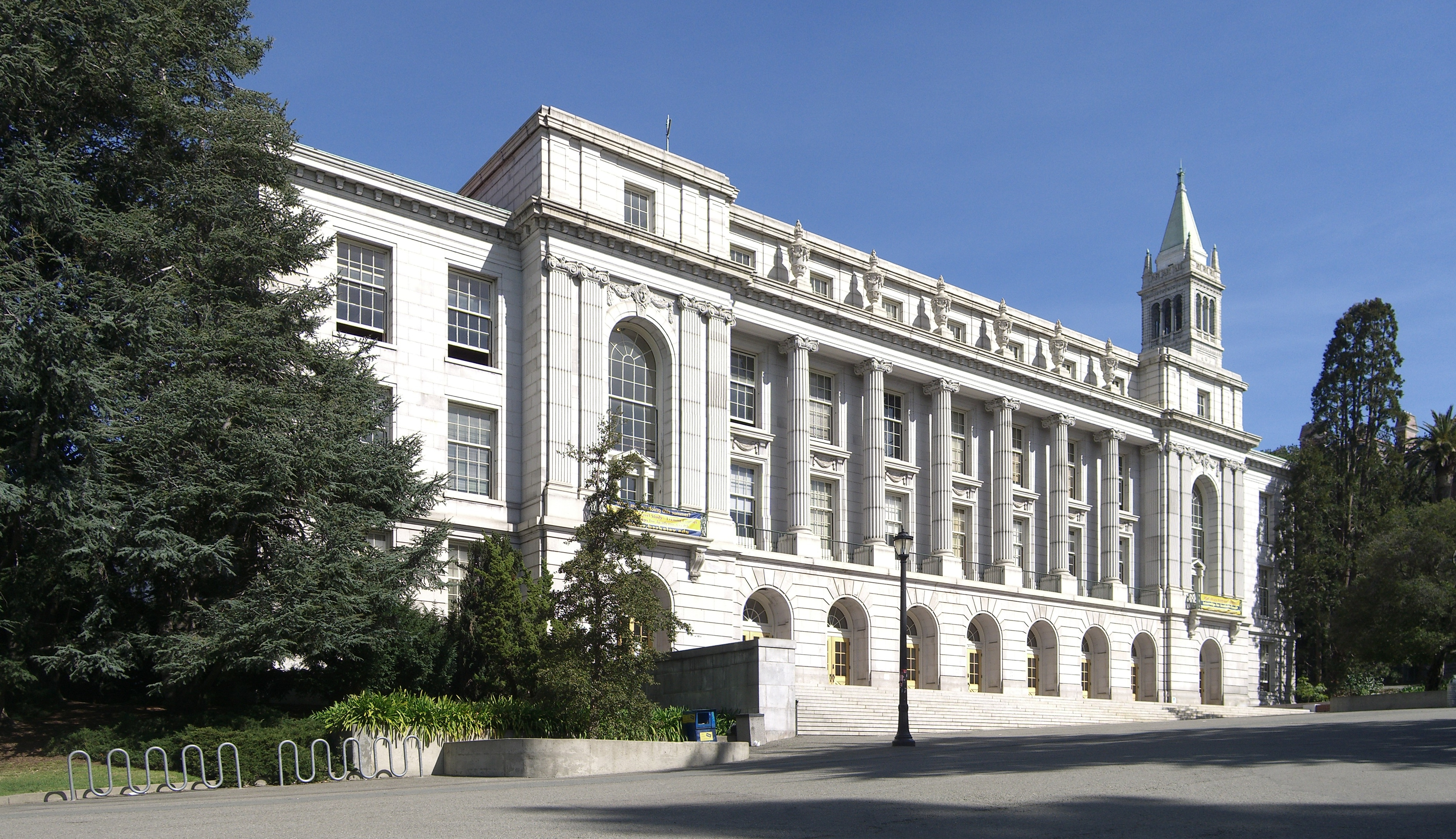
Wheeler Hall, built to represent John Galen Howard's "City of Learning" design, currently houses the campus' largest lecture hall

John Galen Howard retired in 1924, his support base gone with both Phoebe Hearst's death and President Wheeler's resignation in 1919. William Randolph Hearst, seeking to memorialize his mother, contributed to Howard's resignation by commissioning Bernard Maybeck and Julia Morgan to design a series of dramatic buildings on the southern part of the campus. These were originally to include a huge domed auditorium, a museum, an art school, and a women's gymnasium, all arranged on an eastward esplanade and classically oriented towards the campanile. However, only the Hearst Women's Gymnasium was completed before the Great Depression, at which point Hearst decided to focus on his estate at San Simeon instead.

=== Steam tunnels ===
Underneath UC Berkeley's oldest buildings is a system of steam tunnels which carry steam for heat and power. During the 1960s, Berkeley students chained the doorknobs of the Chancellor's office in protest over the Vietnam War. The Chancellor, having no other way in or out of the building, used the steam tunnels to escape. Afterwards, the exterior double doors on that building were changed so they only had one doorknob, and this remains today.

=== Kelham continues precedent ===
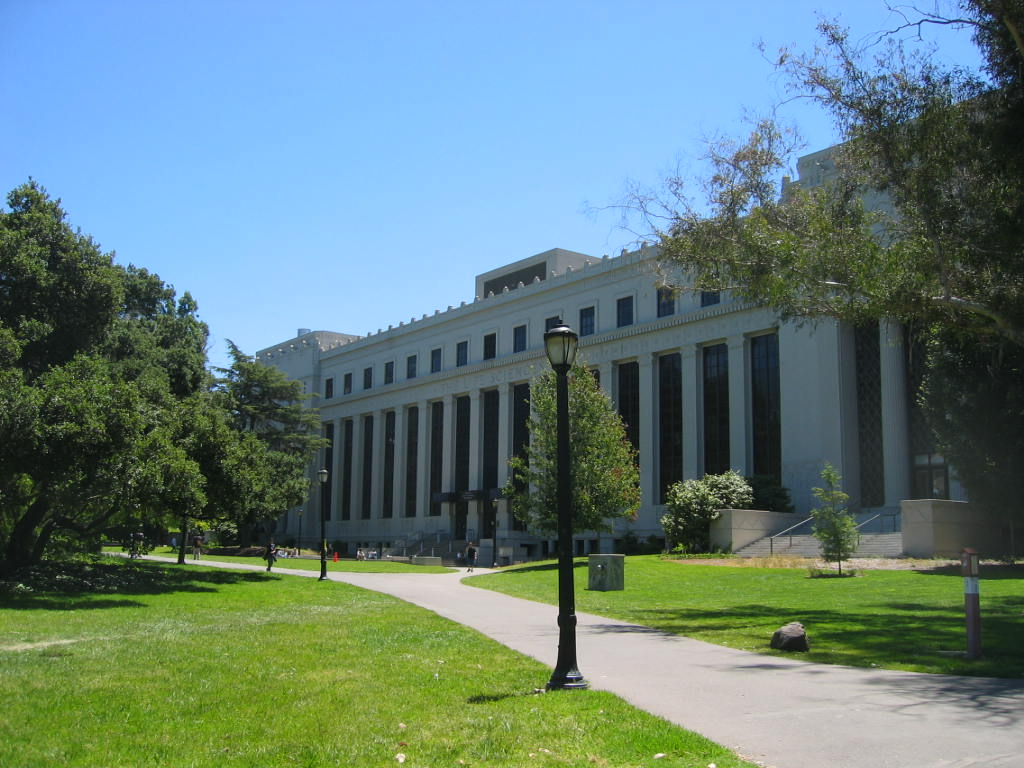
With more than 400,000 ft^{2} (9.2 acres; 3.7 ha) of usable space, the Valley Life Sciences Building is the largest academic building at Berkeley and was the largest building west of the Mississippi River when it was completed in 1930.

From 1927 until his death in 1936, George W. Kelham was supervising architect for the campus; Kelham previously had arrived on the West Coast in the wake of the 1906 San Francisco earthquake and fire and remained there to design notable replacement buildings, including the San Francisco Public Library that was integrated into Howard's Beaux-Arts design for the city government complex at Civic Center. Subsequently, he was appointed the supervising architect of the campus at UCLA in 1925.

During his tenure, Kelham never prepared an overall campus plan update, which fell instead on Warren C. Perry, who had succeeded Howard as the head of the School of Architecture. Kelham designed several individual buildings, including Bowles Hall, 1928; Valley Life Sciences Building, 1930; International House, 1930; Moses Hall, 1931; McLaughlin Hall, 1931; the Engineering Materials Laboratory, 1931 (later replaced by Davis Hall); and the Men's Gym, 1933 (remodeled and now named Haas Pavilion). Bowles Hall is California's oldest state-owned dormitory and is also listed in the National Register of Historic Places. Perry is credited with designing Edwards Stadium, 1932.

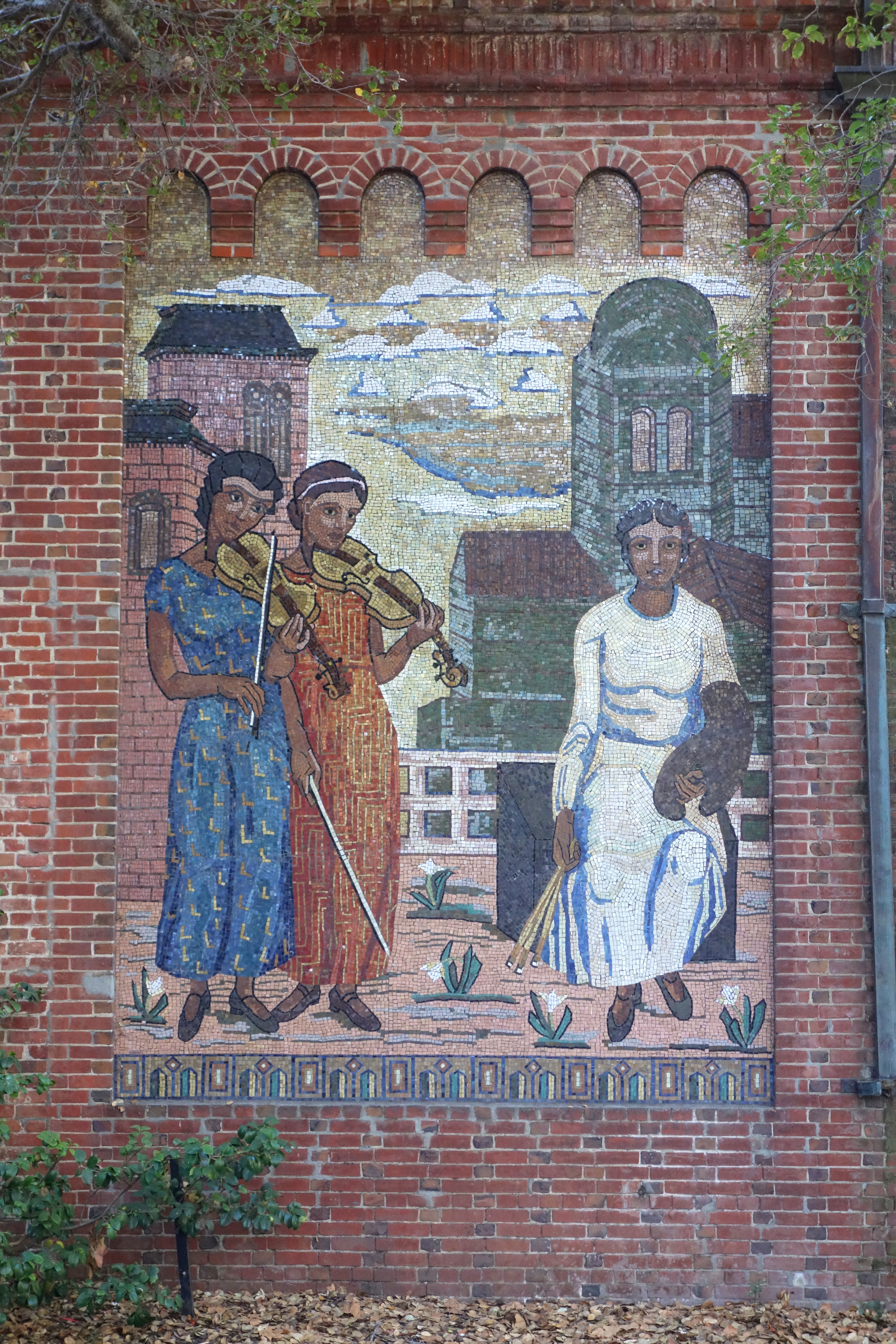
Music and Painting (Swift)

Two mosaic murals by Helen Bell Bruton (Sculpture and Dance) and Florence Alston Swift (Music and Painting) were commissioned by the Works Progress Administration and installed in 1936 on the Old Art Gallery, which originally served as a small utility building designed by Howard and completed in 1904. After Kelham died in 1936, the architectural duties in progress fell on his junior partner, Harry Thomsen.

=== Brown's neoclassical approach ===
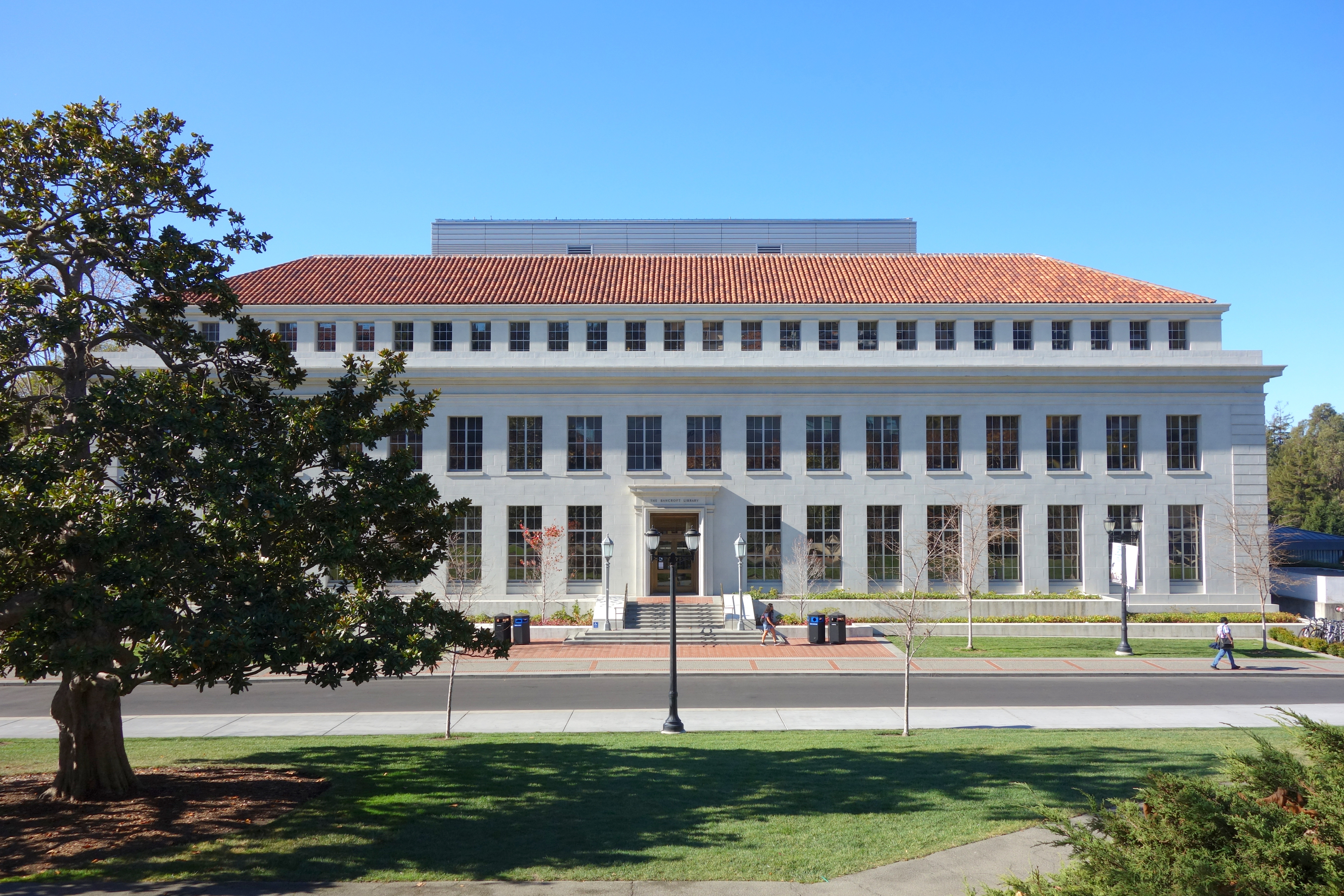
Bancroft Library, view west from the Sather Tower esplanade

From 1938 to 1948, the San Francisco architect Arthur Brown Jr., who had designed several notable buildings in San Francisco, Washington D.C., Stanford University, and elsewhere, served as campus planner and chief architect; he was appointed during the planning phase for Stern Hall and the Administration Building, which would later be renamed Sproul Hall. Brown's Beaux-Arts credentials had been established with the design of San Francisco City Hall (1915).

With his 1944 general plan, Brown broke the long east–west cross-campus axis that dated back to the earliest plans by Olmsted; he shortened it to terminate just before the northeast corner of campus, where he had planned library and mathematics buildings. In addition, he designated uses for the unused northwest (forestry, agriculture, and home economics) and southeast (jurisprudence, anthropology, and arts) corners. The final version of the 1944 plan reduced open spaces on campus to a minimum, as maintaining the Beaux-Arts precedents using low, sprawling buildings in the constrained site was inadequate to handle the forecasted explosive growth in enrollment, and he resigned his post in 1948. At Berkeley, he designed many of his last works, including the Cyclotron Building, 1940; Sproul Hall, 1941; Minor Hall, 1941; Donner Laboratory, 1942; and Bancroft Library (originally Doe Annex), 1949.

== Postwar growth (1950–1980) ==
=== 1951 Campus Plan Study ===
Selected locations on the campus of the University of California, Berkeley
- Buildings and venues
- Landmarks
1 University House (1911)
2 North Gate Hall (1906) and North Gate (1990)
3 Founders' Rock (1860)
4 Evans Hall (1971)
5 Hearst Memorial Mining Building (1907)
6 Hearst Greek Theatre (1903)
7 Crescent Lawn (1929) and Springer Plaza (1964)
8 Valley Life Sciences Building (1930)
9 Doe Memorial Library (1917)
10 South Hall (1873)
11 Sather Tower (1914)
12 Haas School of Business (1995)
13 Haas Pavilion (1933)
14 Sather Gate (1908)
15 Sproul Plaza (1962)
16 Hearst Memorial Gymnasium (1927)
17 College of Environmental Design (Bauer Wurster Hall, 1964)
18 School of Law (Boalt Hall, 1951)
19 California Memorial Stadium (1923)
20 People's Park (1969)

After Brown's departure, the university's Office of Architects and Engineers (A & E), which was established in 1944, assumed supervisory responsibility for campus planning and development. Under the direction of chief architect Robert J. Evans, the office produced a Campus Plan Study in 1951, departing from the Beaux-Arts designs championed over the past fifty years: "blindly following policies and concepts of monumentality unsuited to contemporary requirements ... would straight-jacket a live and vital University into inflexible buildings [and] deprive it of its open spaces, its natural beauty and its true monumentality." Instead, heights would be governed by coverage (not to exceed twenty to thirty percent) and materials selection should be responsive to "the organic requirements of the occupants and ... create maximum practical internal flexibility". The 1952 plan also included high-rise dormitories, to be built south of the main campus. Lawrence Halprin was retained as a consulting landscape architect and submitted a master plan in 1954, but it never was followed.

The large building program of the immediate postwar years produced Lewis Hall (E. Geoffrey Bangs), 1948; Mulford Hall (Miller & Warnecke), 1948; the LeConte Hall addition (Miller & Warnecke), 1950; and Dwinelle Hall (Weihe, Frick & Kruse), 1952, which were all designed in a stripped neoclassical mode; in addition, the Law Building (Warren C. Perry), 1951; Cory Hall (Corlett & Anderson), 1950; Warren Hall (Masten & Hurd), 1955; and Stanley Hall (Goodman), 1952, introduced flat-roofed, modernist forms.

==== Cory Hall ====
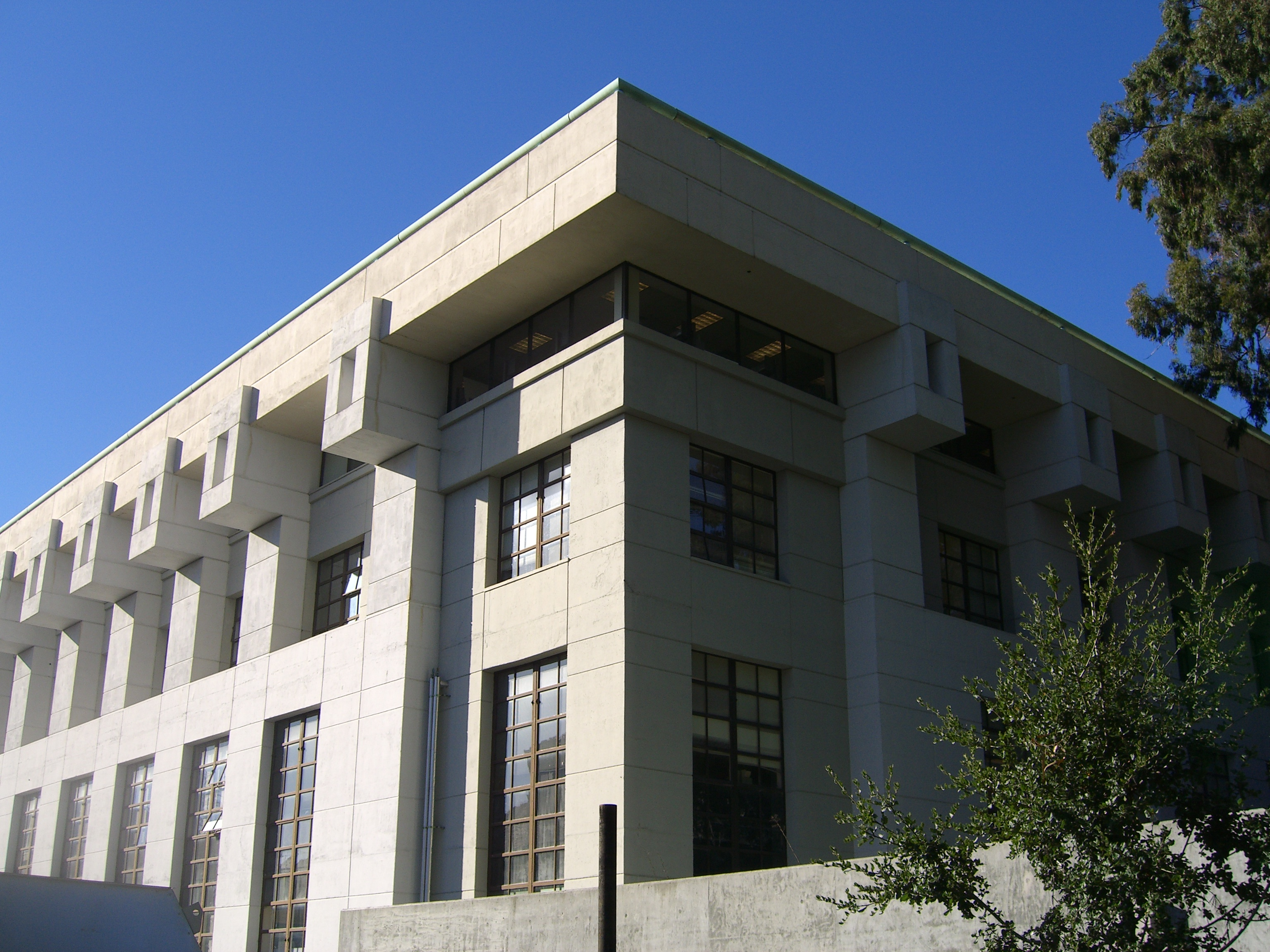
Cory Hall, as remodeled with fifth floor

One of the first new developments in the postwar era was Cory Hall, which houses the Department of Electrical Engineering & Computer Science in the northeast corner of campus. Originally 4 stories, it was designed by Will G. Corlett & Arthur W. Anderson Architects and built in 1950 north of Hearst Memorial Mining Building. The building was named after Clarence Cory, who became the first professor of Mechanical and Electrical Engineering at Berkeley in 1892. Several renovations have been performed since then, including the addition of a distinctive fifth floor, designed by Crosby Thornton Marshall Associates, in 1985. Cory Hall was the only site bombed twice by the Unabomber, in 1982 and 1985.

==== Law Building ====
A new building for the School of Law designed by Warren Charles Perry was dedicated in 1951, in the southeastern corner of campus at the intersection of Piedmont Avenue and Bancroft Way. The School of Jurisprudence originally had been in what is present-day Durant Hall (1912). The site of the new building followed the Brown plan. The building was named Boalt Hall, carried over from the prior building, but the name was stripped in January 2020 after the racist views of its namesake, prominent local lawyer John Henry Boalt, became public. In 2017, it was discovered that an 1877 speech by Boalt published by the California State Senate on "The Chinese Question" later was used to support the passage of the 1882 Chinese Exclusion Act.

A four-story expansion, designed by Wurster, Bernardi, & Emmons, was initiated in 1959, by Boalt Hall alumni who helped raise funds for building the Earl Warren Legal Center. At the same time, the university drew plans for additional classroom, office, and library space. A seven-story high-rise law student dormitory, Manville Hall, was made possible through gifts of other friends of the school. The three-part project was scheduled for completion in 1967. After a remodeling and expansion project was completed in 1996, designed by Crodd Chin, Manville Hall was converted to offices and renamed Simon Hall; law student housing was moved to Manville Apartments in downtown Berkeley. In addition, the law building was expanded again.

==== Old Stanley Hall ====
The modernist Biochemistry and Virus Laboratory, designed by Michael Arthur Goodman Sr., a professor of architecture, was built at the site of what is now Stanley Hall in 1952. The building received a merit award from the American Institute of Architects in 1954. It was renamed the Molecular Biology and Virus Laboratory in 1963, and renamed again as Stanley Hall after the biochemist, virologist, and Nobel Prize winner Wendell Meredith Stanley upon his death in 1971. In 1997, it was rated seismically poor, and it was demolished in 2003. The new, current Stanley Hall was opened in 2007.

==== Dwinelle Hall ====
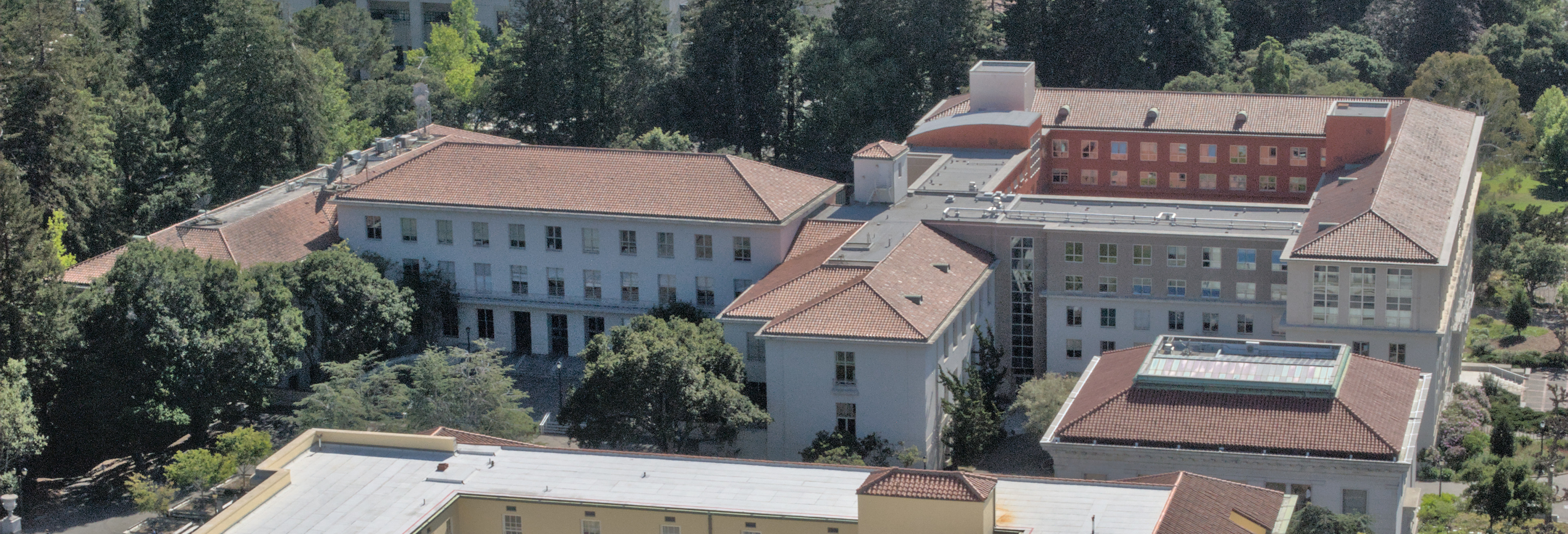
Dwinelle Hall classrooms (left) and offices (right)

Dwinelle Hall was designed by Weihe, Frick and Kruse, architects, with Eckbo Royston & Williams, landscape artists. It was built in 1953 north of Sproul Plaza, to the west of Wheeler Hall. Expansion was completed in 1998. The southern block of Dwinelle Hall contains three levels of classrooms as well as four lecture halls, and the northern block houses seven stories of faculty and department offices. It is named after the lawyer and politician John W. Dwinelle, who introduced the Organic Act establishing the University of California.

Its rooms are strangely numbered both because Dwinelle Hall was built with entrances on different levels on a slope and because its expansions were numbered differently from the original building. Because this confusing building is host to both large lecture classes and numerous discussion classes, it is sometimes called the "freshman maze."

=== 1956 Long Range Development Plan ===
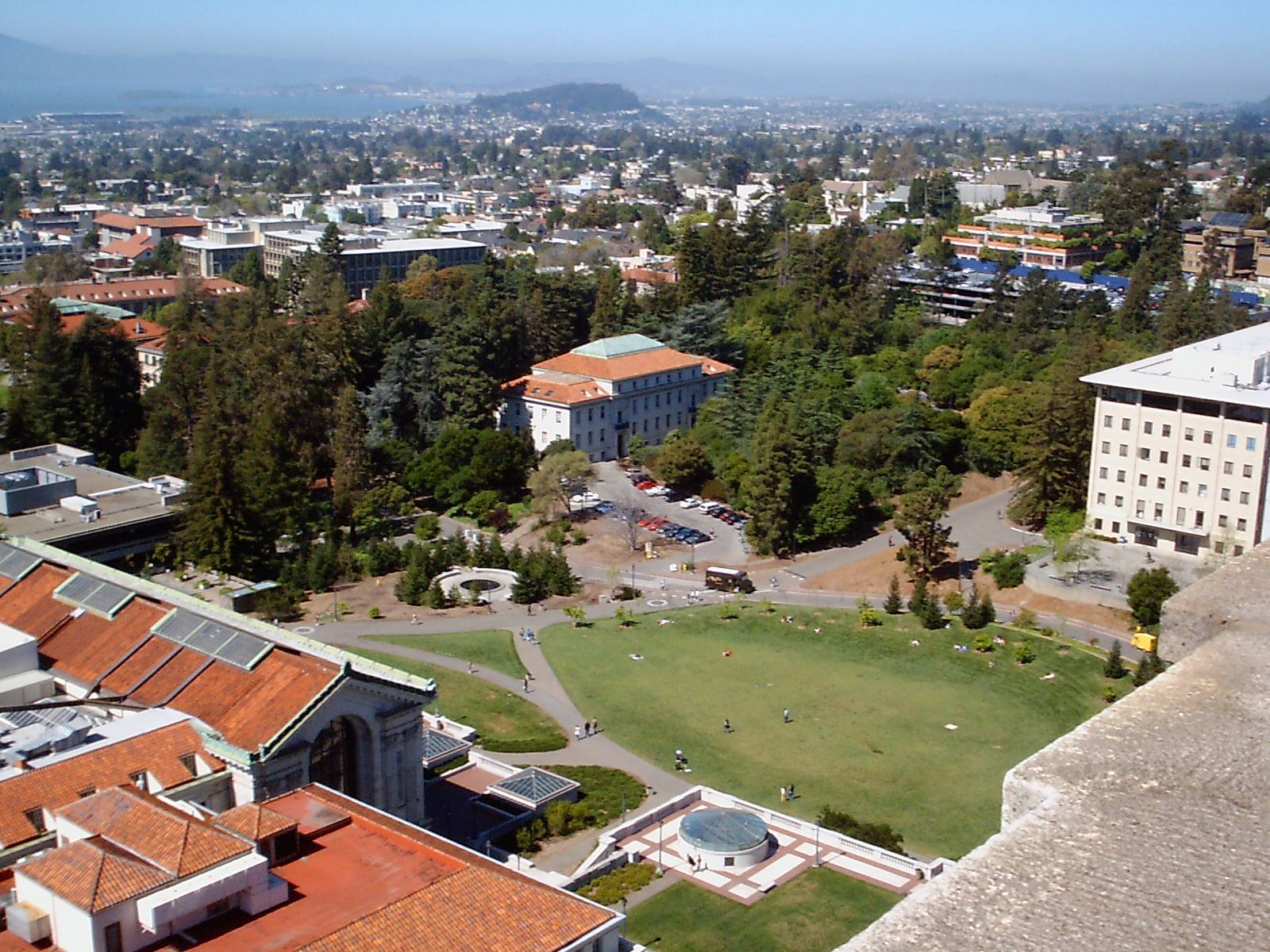
Memorial Glade, at the center of the Berkeley campus.

In 1955, to transform the A & E study into a Long Range Development Plan, the Regents appointed a Committee on Campus Planning that included Regent Donald H. McLaughlin as chairman, Chancellor Clark Kerr, and William Wurster, who was both Campus Consulting Architect and dean of the College of Architecture. The plan was published in 1956. Wurster championed the development of high-rise buildings to ensure that open spaces could be preserved, codifying the 25% coverage ratio, which also would "restore the campus to its old sculptural form." He also retained Brown's shortened main axis and first proposed the development of what would become Memorial Glade, north of Doe Library; in the immediate aftermath of the war, that space was occupied by temporary buildings. Student circulation was considered, with a ten-minute class change time proposed. Thomas D. Church succeeded Halprin as consulting landscape architect for the campus in 1957, and oversaw the removal of most vehicle traffic through campus.

Initial development under the new plan included Morrison and Hertz Halls, the Anthropology and Art Practice Building, the first phase of the Student Center, Campbell Hall, O'Brien Hall, and McCone Hall. University Hall on Oxford Street and first two units of the Residence Halls in Southside were also built during this time. For the first time, large-scale demolition claimed buildings dating back to the 1880s.

==== Hertz and Morrison Halls ====
Hertz and Morrison Halls, both designed by Gardner A. Dailey & Associates, were completed in 1958. They are located south of the Faculty Club near the southeastern edge of campus and connected to each other by a covered walkway. Both buildings have gable roofs, and compared to other post-War developments, both are relatively small in size: Hertz Hall is a 4-story concert hall, and Morrison Hall is 2 stories. Both buildings are used by the Department of Music.

Hertz Hall was named for the 1915-30 conductor of the San Francisco Symphony, Alfred Hertz, who left his estate to Berkeley for music. Its 678-seat concert hall hosts free noontime concerts during the academic year. The building also houses the music department's collection of historic organs. Morrison Hall was named after May T. Morrison, class of 1878, who left money for this building in her will, as well as for the Morrison Library in Doe.

==== Anthropology and Art Practice Building ====
A 6-story building designed by Gardner A. Dailey was built east of the Law Building in 1959. Until 2021, it was named Kroeber Hall after the anthropology professor Alfred Kroeber. It houses the Departments of Anthropology and Art Practice along with the Phoebe A. Hearst Museum of Anthropology, the Worth Ryder Art Gallery, and the Anthropology Library. On January 26, 2021, Berkeley officials announced the removal of the name Kroeber Hall, citing Kroeber's unethical actions toward Native American communities.

==== Upper Sproul, King Student Union, and Chavez Student Center ====
The original Martin Luther King Jr. Student Union building, owned by the ASUC Auxiliary, was constructed with funds gained from the sale of the Cal sports teams to the university in 1959. The original building was designed by Vernon DeMars, professor of architecture. It contains an information center, multicultural center, lounges, a bookstore, restaurants and a pub, an art studio and computer lab.

The Chavez Student Center was built in 1960 and named in honor of Cesar Chavez, the founding president of the farm workers' union. The building was once mainly a dining commons and lounge, but in 1990 it was renovated to house various student services.

==== O'Brien Hall ====
A modernist 3-story building designed by Van Bourg & Nakamura was built in 1959 adjoined to the eastern side of Hesse Hall. In 1968, it was named after Morrough Parker O'Brien, who spent two decades as an engineering professor before serving as dean of the College of Engineering from 1948 to 1959. It houses environmental engineering and the Water Resources Center Archives.

==== McCone Hall ====
McCone Hall, a 7-story building designed by John Carl Warnecke, was built in 1961 across from the Doe Memorial Library on the northern side of Memorial Glade and adjoined to the western side of Hesse Hall. It was originally called the Earth Sciences Building, and now houses the Departments of Earth & Planetary Science and Geography, the Earth Sciences and Map Library, and the Berkeley Seismological Laboratory. It was named after Berkeley alumnus and former CIA director John A. McCone. A seismic retrofit and renovation was undertaken from 1997 to 1999.

=== 1962 Long Range Development Plan and 1960s construction boom ===
To reflect changes in conditions, a revised Long Range Development Plan was prepared in 1962 under the direction of an expanded Campus Planning Committee headed successively by Chancellors Glenn T. Seaborg and Edward Strong. In addition to Wurster, the committee included Consulting Landscape Architect Thomas Church, Campus Architect Louis A. DeMonte of the Office of Architects and Engineers and four other university officials. The new plan related to the California Master Plan for Higher Education of 1960, which established the roles of the public junior colleges, state college system, and the University of California, and the subsequent University Growth Plan prepared by President Clark Kerr to guide academic development of the university. Enrollment levels were established with a maximum at Berkeley of 27,500 projected for the mid-1960s. The revised plan also included the use of Strawberry Canyon and the hill area, as well as outlying campus properties not previously considered, and incorporated several landscaping proposals prepared by Church for the central campus, most notably the Springer Memorial Gateway on the west side and the landscaping for Wurster Hall.

During the 1960s, 17 major buildings were constructed on the central campus. Several more were developed on the peripheral sites, including Etcheverry Hall, the Berkeley Art Museum, the Unit 3 Residence Halls, and several parking structures. The upper hill was developed with two buildings by Anshen and Allen, Lawrence Hall of Science and the Silver Space Sciences Laboratory.

The administration moved out of Sproul and into California Hall, situated in the heart of campus, after students barricaded themselves in Sproul during the 1964 Free Speech Movement. (Today, Sproul Hall houses Student Services and the Admissions Office, and Sproul Plaza is the center of student activities.)

==== Northeast science and engineering buildings ====
The northeast quadrant of campus, north of Strawberry Creek and east of Doe Memorial Library, was the site of the most active development during the 1960s. Several buildings were constructed for math, science, and engineering departments.

===== Latimer, Pimentel, and Hildebrand Halls =====
Latimer, Pimentel, and Hildebrand Halls, a group of modernist buildings designed by Anshen & Allen, were built between 1963 and 1966 for the College of Chemistry. They joined the existing chemistry buildings Gilman Hall, Lewis Hall, and Giauque Hall.

Latimer Hall, an 11-story building, was built between and to the north of Gilman and Lewis Halls in 1963. It is named after Wendell Mitchell Latimer, dean of the College of Chemistry in the 1940s. Pimentel Hall, a round, 2-story lecture hall, was built north of Latimer Hall in 1964 and named after George C. Pimentel, inventor of the chemical laser. Hildebrand Hall was built in between Gilman and Lewis Halls to the south of the complex in 1966. It is named after Joel Henry Hildebrand, a long-time chemistry professor and dean, and houses the California Institute for Quantitative Biosciences and the Chemistry and Chemical Engineering Library.

===== Etcheverry Hall =====
Etcheverry Hall, designed by Skidmore, Owings & Merrill, was built in 1964. It was the first building built by the university on the north side of Hearst Avenue. The building was named after Bernard A. Etcheverry, a professor of irrigation and drainage from 1915 to 1951. Its basement housed the Berkeley Research Reactor from 1966 to 1987, and it now houses the Departments of Mechanical, Nuclear, and Industrial Engineering.

===== Birge Hall =====
Birge Hall, a 9-story building designed by John Carl Warnecke, was completed in 1964 to provide more space for the Department of Physics. It was named for Raymond Thayer Birge, who had been a professor of physics for 45 years (including 22 as department chair) when the new building was named in his honor. Bacon Hall, the university's elegant library and art gallery built in 1881, was demolished to provide space for construction.

===== Davis Hall =====
Davis Hall, designed by Skidmore, Owings & Merrill, was built in 1968 to the west of the Hearst Memorial Mining Building. It was named for Professor Raymond Davis, who spent 50 years on the Berkeley faculty and developed the Engineering Materials Laboratory into one of the world's finest. Davis Hall houses the offices of the Department of Civil and Environmental Engineering, including its structural and earthquake engineering labs and teaching facilities. The building's ground-floor “structures bay” rises two stories, providing space for testing many types of materials and designs, from scale models of California highway overpasses to segments of the Golden Gate Bridge.

===== Evans Hall =====
Evans Hall, a 10-story building designed by Gardner A. Dailey and completed in 1971, is the tallest instructional building on the campus and houses the offices of faculty in mathematics, statistics, and economics. It was named after Griffith C. Evans, chairman of mathematics from 1934 to 1949. It blocked the central axis and cast a tall shadow over the adjacent Hearst Memorial Mining Building, leading the former committee chairman Donald H. McLaughlin to remark that it had become "painfully intrusive". A recent campus development plan lists Evans Hall as a candidate for demolition within the next fifteen years.

==== Southeastern section ====
===== Bauer Wurster Hall =====
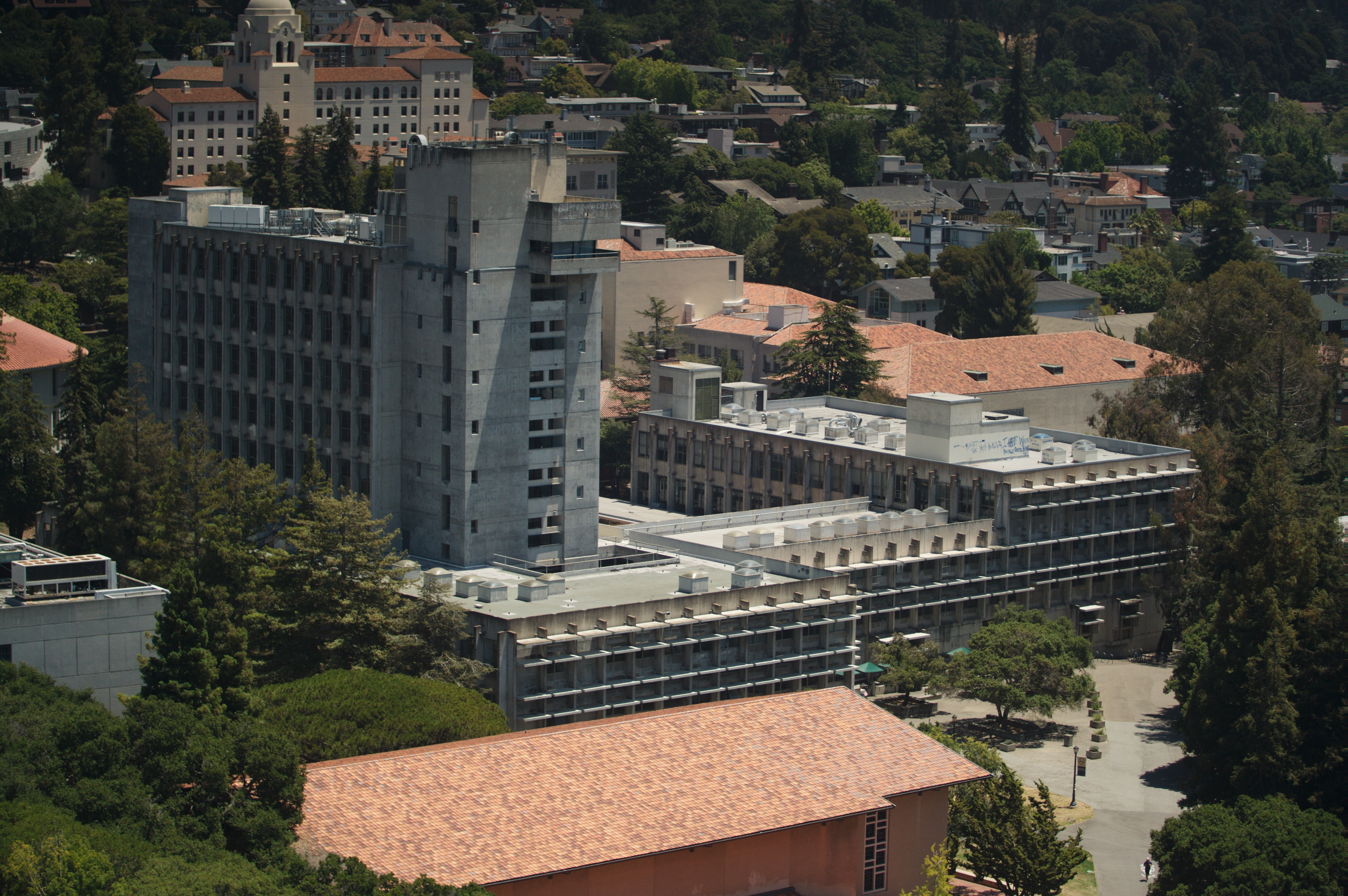
Bauer Wurster Hall from Sather Tower, with International House Berkeley in the background

Bauer Wurster Hall, a building for the UC Berkeley College of Environmental Design, was completed in 1964 northwest of the Law Building. It was designed by Joseph Esherick, Vernon DeMars, and Donald Olsen, members of the CED faculty. The building was originally named Wurster Hall for William Wurster, dean of the School of Architecture and its successor, the College of Environmental Design (1950–62), and his wife, the public housing advocate and lecturer Catherine Bauer Wurster.

===== Calvin Laboratory =====
The Chemical Biodynamics Lab, located east of Bauer Wurster Hall, was designed by Michael Arthur Goodman Sr., who had also designed the old Stanley Hall, and completed in 1964. The Chemical Biodynamics Lab director was Melvin Calvin, the biochemist known for discovering the Calvin cycle, until his retirement in 1980, at which point the building was renamed the Melvin Calvin Laboratory in his honor. It continued to function as a laboratory until fall 2012, when it began to be repurposed as the Simons Institute for the Theory of Computing, which opened in 2013. The renovation was done by Studios Architecture, a San Francisco firm founded in 1985.

==== South central ====
===== Social Sciences Building =====
The Social Sciences Building, a 10-story modernist building designed by Aleck L. Wilson & Associates, was completed in 1964. Until 2020, it was named Barrows Hall after David Prescott Barrows, political science professor and president of the university from 1919 to 1923. It houses the Departments of Political Science, Sociology, African American Studies, Ethnic Studies, Near Eastern Studies, Asian American Studies, Chicano Studies, Native American Studies, and Gender & Women's Studies, along with the Energy & Resources Group. On November 18, 2020, campus officials announced their decision to remove the name of Barrows Hall, due to David Prescott Barrows' history of white supremacy. Until a new name is chosen, it will be referred to as the Social Sciences Building.

From 1915 to 1932, the site contained a cinder running track with wooden bleachers designed by John Galen Howard.

===== Lower Sproul, Zellerbach Hall, and Old Eshleman Hall =====
Zellerbach Hall, a multi-venue performance facility designed by Vernon DeMars, was completed in 1968. It is located west of Lower Sproul Plaza. The facility consists of two primary performance spaces: the 1,984-seat Zellerbach Auditorium, and the 500-seat Zellerbach Playhouse.

Eshleman Hall, designed by Hardison and DeMars as part of the Sproul Plaza plan, was built in 1965. It was named for John Morton Eshleman.

==== Northwest ====
In the northwest, Tolman Hall was built in 1963, and Barker Hall in 1964.

==== Berkeley Art Museum and Pacific Film Archive ====
In 1970, the Berkeley Art Museum and Pacific Film Archive opened on Bancroft Way across from the Hearst Gymnasium in a building designed by Mario J. Ciampi. In 2011, the building was named Woo Hon Fai Hall in 2011 in honor of the father of David Woo, a Hong Kong–based businessman and Berkeley alumnus who began his career as an architect on the Ciampi project. The museum closed at this location on Sunday, December 21, 2014.

== Modern developments (1980+) ==
Construction had slowed significantly by the 1980s and 1990s. Developments in this era included the Haas School of Business, the Bechtel Engineering Center, Tan Kah Kee Hall, Soda Hall, and the Genetics and Plant Biology Building. In addition, several athletics facilities were built in the southwestern area of campus.

=== Soda Hall ===
Soda Hall, which is located north of Cory Hall and houses the Computer Science Division, is one of the few classroom buildings on campus with showers. It was designed by the New York architect Edward Larrabee Barnes with the local firm Allen and Anshen and completed in August 1994 at the cost of $35.5 million, raised entirely from private gifts.

=== New construction developments ===
Recent developments include the newly completed Jean Hargrove Music Library, the fourth free-standing music library to be constructed in the United States.

In 2006, the new Stanley Hall, named after the 1946 winner of the Nobel Prize in Chemistry, opened its doors. It houses the headquarters of the California Institute for Quantitative Biosciences (QB3) and serves as a center for interdisciplinary teaching and research as part of the campus Health Sciences Initiative. Designed by Zimmer Gunsul Frasca Architects, the 285,000 sq ft (26,500 m^{2}). building contains 40 laboratories, and a 300-seat auditorium.

Davis Hall, primarily the location of the Civil Engineering Department, will be expanded to serve as the headquarters for the Center for Information Technology Research in the Interest of Society (CITRIS). Estimated at 185,000 sq ft (17,200 m^{2})., the building will support a "broad array of projects, from information systems for emergency and disaster response in an earthquake to life-saving medical alert sensors, to ‘smart’ buildings that automatically adjust their internal environments, to save energy and reduce pollution." It will include nanofabrication facilities, labs, and classrooms.

The Tien Center for East Asian Studies, named for Chang Lin Tien, one of the campus' most beloved chancellors, consists of the C.V. Starr East Asian Studies Library, intended to maintain Berkeley's strengths in the subject. The first free-standing buildings to be devoted to East Asian Studies in the United States, the Library is open after completion and dedication in October 2007. The library houses the largest collections of East Asian materials outside of Asia and behind the collections of Harvard University and the Library of Congress.

Jacobs Hall is a building for design innovation at the University of California, Berkeley. It is located on the north side of Hearst Avenue, across the street from the main campus. The floor plan includes flexible space with tools for prototyping, iteration, and fabrication. Construction began in August 2014 with a $20 million grant from the Paul and Stacy Jacobs foundation. The hall was inspired and named after Paul E. Jacobs, UC Berkeley alumnus, philanthropist, and also the executive chair of Qualcomm Inc.

== Student housing ==
Following World War II, the Regents decided to offer on-campus housing to 25% of its undergraduates, with plans to build six residence hall complexes housing 4,800 students. Ultimately, Units 1, 2, and 3 were completed in the 1960s, providing housing for up to 3,100 undergraduates; the architect was John Carl Warnecke with landscape design by Lawrence Halprin. Each unit as completed had four nine-story concrete towers surrounding a two-story building with a dining hall and common facilities. The design of Unit 3 was modified to reduce cost compared to the first two.

== Notes ==
=== Bibliography ===
- Helfand, Harvey (2002). University of California, Berkeley: An Architectural Tour and Photographs. The Campus Guide. New York: Princeton Architectural Press. ISBN 1-56898-293-3.
