= Evans Hall (UC Berkeley) =

Building at the University of California, Berkeley, United States

Coordinates: 37.87363°N 122.25783°W

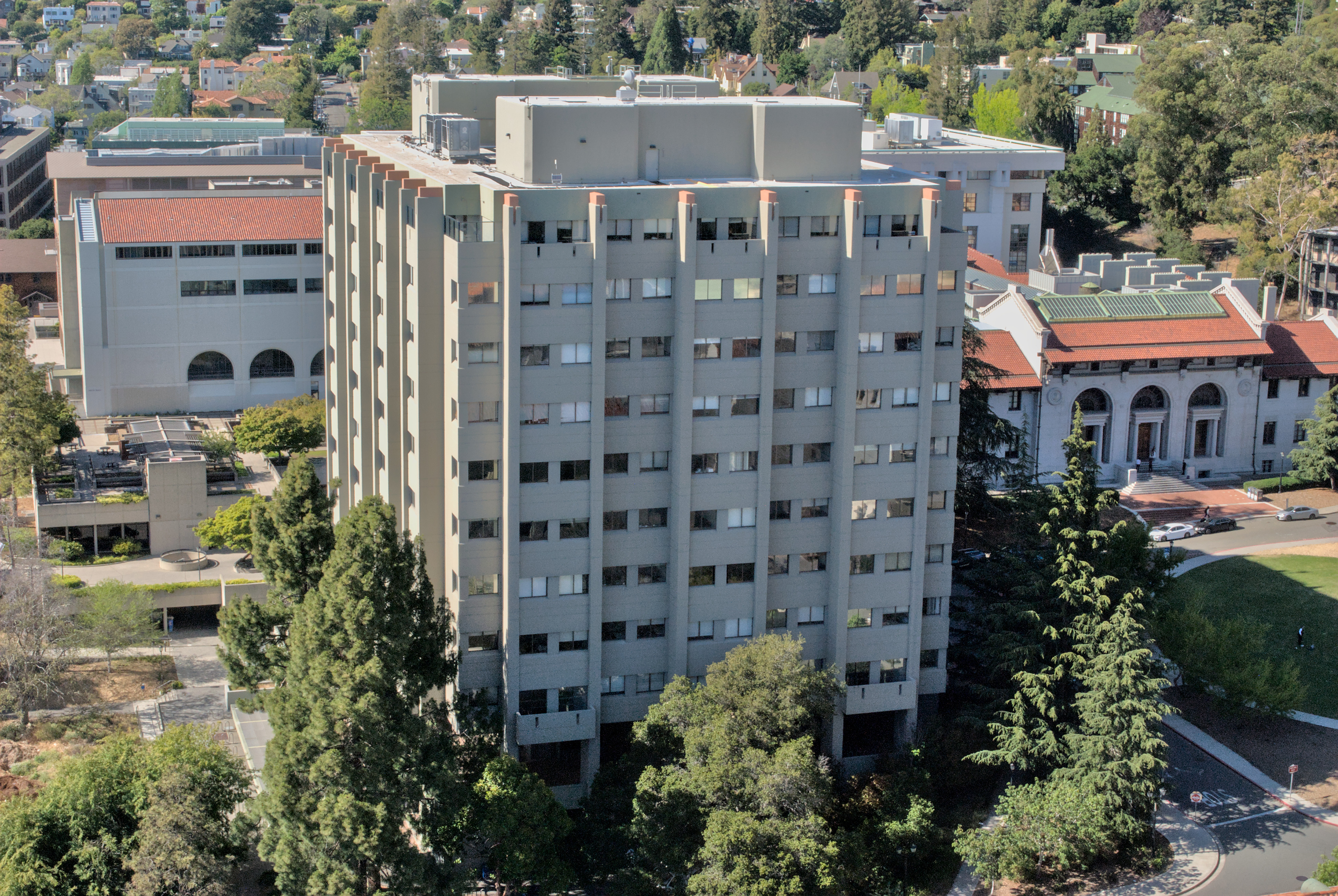
Evans Hall as seen from Sather Tower in 2022.

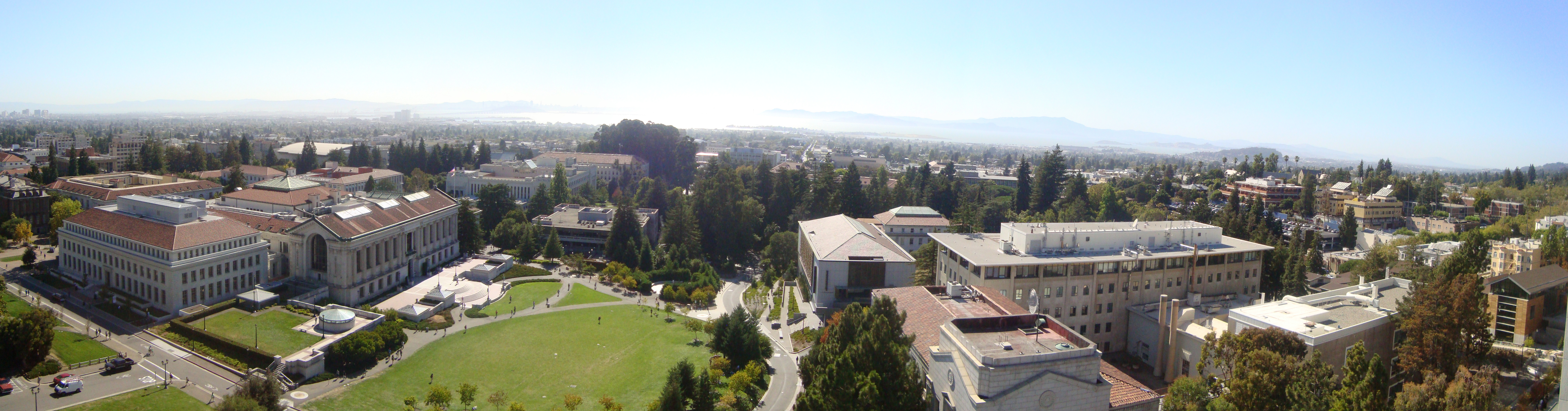
Panoramic view from Evans Hall, September 2010.

Evans Hall is the statistics, economics, and mathematics building on the campus of the University of California, Berkeley.

== Computer history importance ==
Evans Hall also served as the gateway for the entire west coast's ARPAnet access during the early stages of the Internet's existence; at the time, the backbone was a 56 kbit/s line to Chicago.

Because of its proximity to the engineering school, and the location of both the departments of Computer Science, and Mathematics, Evans Hall was the building in which the original vi text editor was programmed, as well as the birthplace of Berkeley Unix (BSD), and Rogue, which was further developed there by Glenn C Wickman, and Michael Toy. Rogue's origins included the curses library, which Rogue was originally written to test. Additionally, both Ingres and Postgres were originally coded in Evans, under Prof. Michael Stonebraker's direction.

The TCP/IP protocol stack was the product of work at many institutions; the software backbone was developed at Evans Hall in 1981, in the Berkeley sockets library, and it (and its descendants) still power the Internet today.

In 1979, in Evans Hall, Berkeley graduate student Eric Allman wrote the Delivermail program, eventually turning it into Sendmail, the ubiquitous email program on the Internet.

Evans Hall was the site of one of the world's most advanced computer architecture groups in the 1980s. In this building, under the supervision of Professors David Patterson and Randy Katz, the Berkeley RISC series of processors were developed, pioneering Reduced Instruction Set Computing. The Berkeley RISC architecture was commercialized by Sun Microsystems as the SPARC Architecture, and inspired the ARM architecture used in about 98% of all cellphones.

Professors Katz and Patterson, along with Katz' student Garth Gibson also devised the Redundant Array of Inexpensive Disk architecture, widely used in computing systems today.

Professor William "Velvel" Kahan devised the IEEE 754 floating-point architecture standard used in every processor today.

Evans Hall was also the site of the development of the first system-independent scripting language, Tcl, by Professor John Ousterhout. Prior to Tcl, scripting languages were tied to specific systems, which limited both their range and the user community developing them. Ousterhout invented a protocol which would permit any C function to be invoked by a Tcl command, making Tcl a scripting interface for many underlying systems. This concept was later adopted by Python, JavaScript, and many other scripting languages, so that most programming in the world today is done using scripting languages.

The office of Professor Doug Cooper, who wrote the widely used programming textbook "Oh! Pascal!", was in this building.

== Architecture ==
Selected locations on the campus of the University of California, Berkeley
- Buildings and venues
- Landmarks
1 University House (1911)
2 North Gate Hall (1906) and North Gate (1990)
3 Founders' Rock (1860)
4 Evans Hall (1971)
5 Hearst Memorial Mining Building (1907)
6 Hearst Greek Theatre (1903)
7 Crescent Lawn (1929) and Springer Plaza (1964)
8 Valley Life Sciences Building (1930)
9 Doe Memorial Library (1917)
10 South Hall (1873)
11 Sather Tower (1914)
12 Haas School of Business (1995)
13 Haas Pavilion (1933)
14 Sather Gate (1908)
15 Sproul Plaza (1962)
16 Hearst Memorial Gymnasium (1927)
17 College of Environmental Design (Bauer Wurster Hall, 1964)
18 School of Law (Boalt Hall, 1951)
19 California Memorial Stadium (1923)
20 People's Park (1969)

=== Construction ===
Evans Hall is situated at the northeast corner of campus, just east of Memorial Glade. It was built in 1971 and is named after Griffith C. Evans, chairman of mathematics from 1934 to 1949 who combined the fields of mathematics and economics. The architect was Gardner Dailey.

In the 1990s, this building saw significant renovation including seismic retrofits and a new paint job. Today, the building sports a blue-green exterior with orange-red accents.

=== Safety concerns ===
As part of the university's New Century Plan, the building is recommended for demolition and replacement, due in part to its unsafe earthquake readiness rating. In 2000, it was proposed that two shorter buildings replace Evans Hall.

Although Evans Hall's seismic rating is poor, the rating is common on the UC Berkeley campus with over fifty buildings sharing the rating. A rating of poor translates to that a major earthquake would likely cause "significant structural damage and appreciable life hazards".

During the early 2000s, because of rusting of the frame of the building, "large pieces of concrete began falling off the face of Evans Hall without warning". Repairing the building cost two million dollars.

In February 2022, the university announced that due to cost, Evans Hall will not be seismically renovated and will be demolished.

== Aesthetic complaints ==
Evans Hall was voted one of the ugliest buildings in UC Berkeley by its student body.

Evans Hall is known for its large number of windowless classrooms. The Chronicle of Higher Education has called it "an imposing concrete structure that most people on the campus would like to see demolished". Former chancellor Robert M. Berdahl has described the building as without "stirrings of pride in placement, or massing, or architectural design". Some complain the building disturbs the view of the San Francisco Bay.

Math related murals have been painted inside the building in protest against its aesthetics.

Evans Hall was repainted a gray-green so that the building would blend into the Berkeley hills.

== Rumors and legends ==
=== Suicides ===
A series of students at the university have committed suicide at Evans Hall, primarily by jumping off ninth or tenth floors of the building. This has led some to believe the building is haunted. It has also spawned an untrue rumor that the university has put a "suicide alarm" on the tenth floor of Evans Hall.

=== Unabomber ===
There is a widespread rumor that math professor Theodore Kaczynski taught in Evans Hall. He would later become an environmental terrorist known as the Unabomber. Official publications from the university have repeated the rumor. In reality, it is impossible that Kaczynski taught in Evans Hall as he left the university in 1969 and the building was not constructed until 1971. He actually had his office in temporary buildings that have since been torn down.
