= Dwinelle Hall =

University building in California

Coordinates: 37.87068°N 122.26044°W

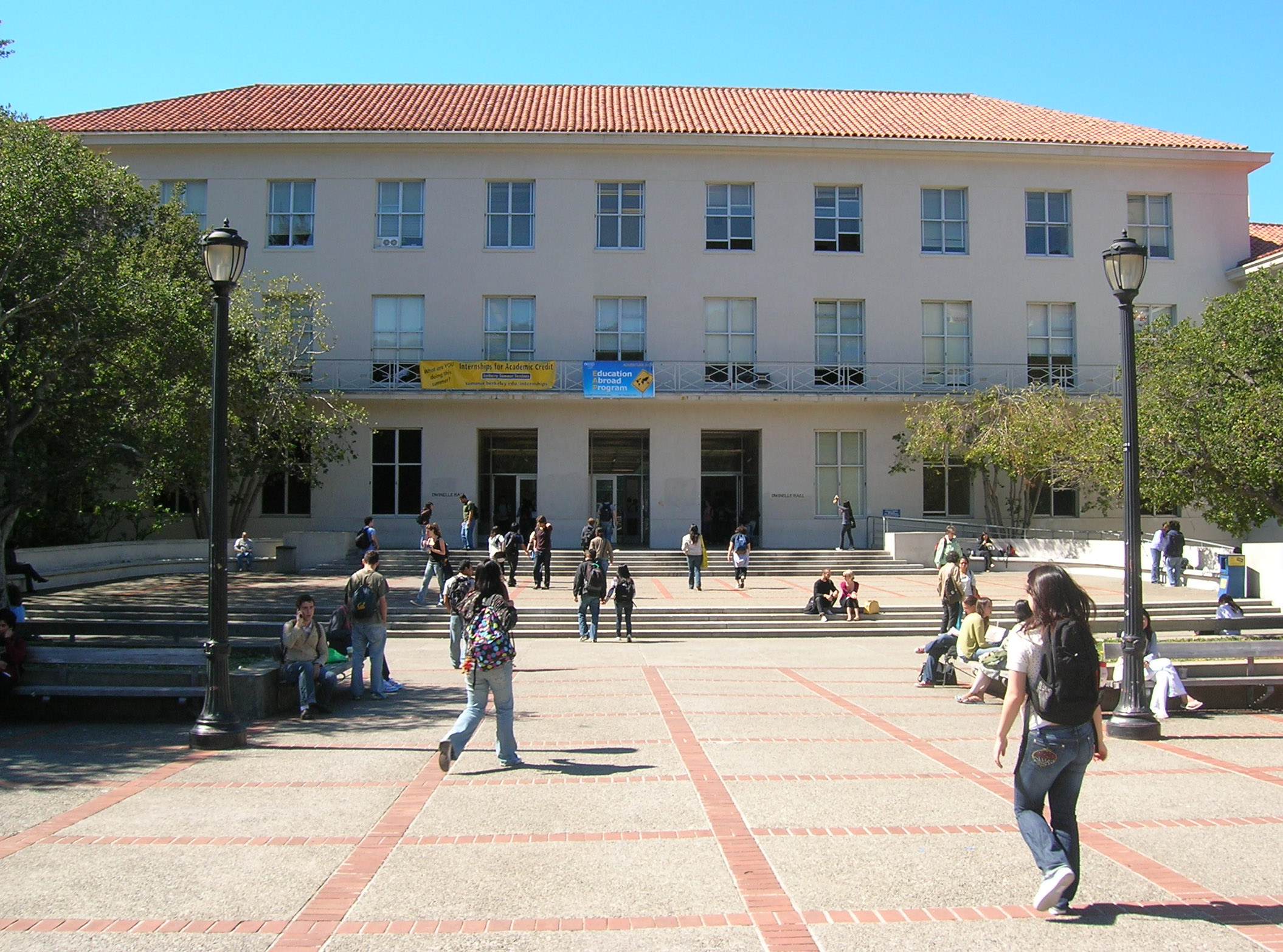
Dwinelle Hall

Dwinelle Hall is the second largest building on the campus of the University of California, Berkeley. It was completed in 1952. It is named after John W. Dwinelle, the state assemblyman responsible for the Organic Act that established the University of California in 1868, and who went on to serve as one of the first Regents of the University of California. Dwinelle is home to many of the humanities and social sciences departments of the College of Letters and Science: namely, the departments of Ancient Greek & Roman Studies, East Asian Languages and Cultures, rhetoric, linguistics, history, comparative literature, South and Southeast Asian Studies, film studies, French, German, Italian studies, Scandinavian, Slavic languages, Spanish and Portuguese, and gender and women's studies.

Although many myths surround the odd construction of the building, Dwinelle Hall was designed by Ernest E. Weihe, Edward L. Frick, and Lawrence A. Kruse, with landscape artists Eckbo Royston & Williams. Construction was completed in 1953, with expansion completed in 1998. The southern block of Dwinelle Hall contains three levels of classrooms as well as four lecture halls, and the northern block houses seven stories of faculty and department offices. While the northern office block of Dwinelle is often referred to as the "Dwinelle Annex," it should not be confused with the Dwinelle Annex, which is a wooden building located to the west of Dwinelle Hall.

The Dwinelle Annex was designed by John Galen Howard and built in 1920. Until 1933, it was used for military science, after which it was used for music from 1933 to 1958. During these periods of use, it was called the Military Sciences Building and the Music Building. Some remodeling was done in 1933 to accommodate the music department, and in 1949, it was enlarged to include a music library. Dramatic Arts and Comparative Literature moved into the building in 1958. More recently, the College Writing Program occupied the top floor. The annex is currently home to the Creekside Center, which is the main hub for UC Berkeley's Disabled Students' Program.

== Construction ==
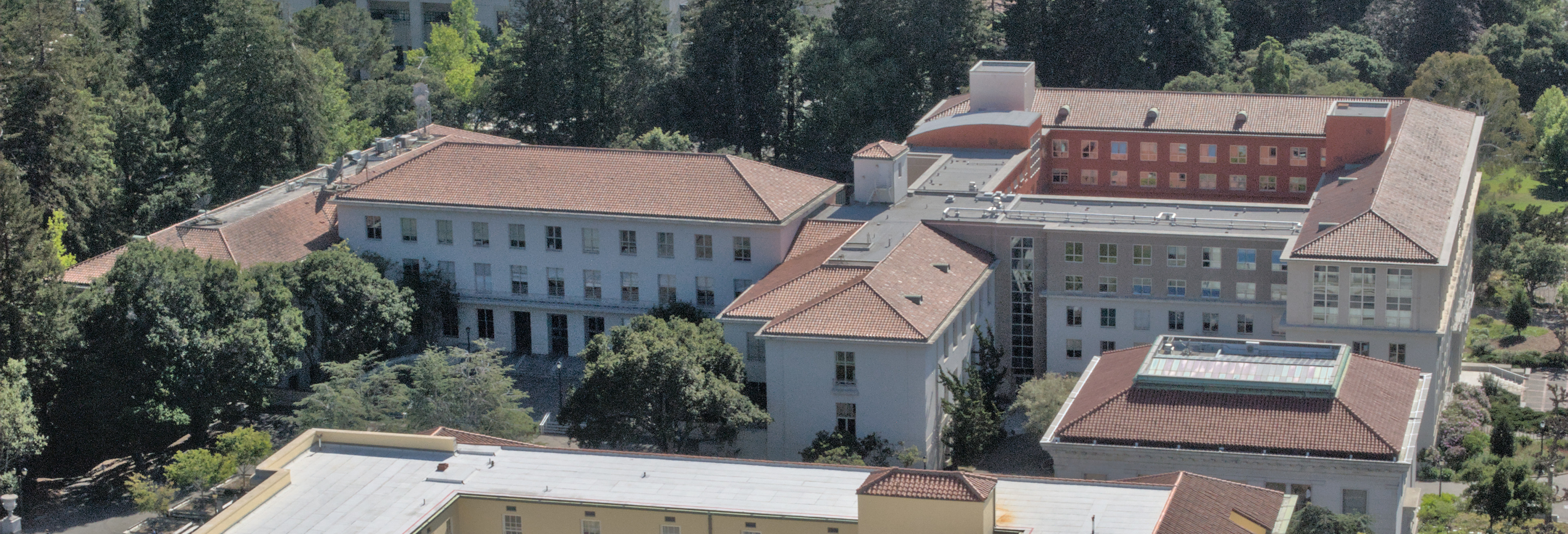
Dwinelle Hall as viewed from Sather Tower in 2022

The location and design of Dwinelle Hall was chosen to allow easier access for the expanded student body after World War II, as well as for faculty after the center of campus shifted southward towards Sather Gate. Dwinelle's odd shape was not created on a whim or by accident. The north wing and office block are aligned with Berkeley's older buildings like California Hall, Wheeler Hall, and Doe Memorial Library (which are all aligned along a southwesterly axis pointing towards the Golden Gate), while the southern wing is aligned with the (at the time) newer section of campus containing Sproul Hall as well as the city grid to the south.

Norman Jensen oversaw the construction of Dwinelle Hall, and the same firm that constructed San Francisco City Hall, Arthur Brown Jr., selected the company of Weihe, Frick and Kruse to construct the building. The construction site was initially intended for two separate buildings, and the annex was to be built with lower ceilings, and simple heating and ventilation systems, because it was designed to house offices rather than classrooms. Reinforced concrete was used in construction because "granite was no longer a viable facing option."

The Dwinelle Expansion Project began in 1996 and was completed in 1998. The project included the addition of two new floors to the office block, cost $10 million, expanded the building about 20%, and required the temporary removal of the roof.

Dwinelle is frequently referred to as the "Freshman Maze" because of its confusing architecture. Soon after the building's construction, according to author William Rodarmor, students would "enter Dwinelle in their freshman year and emerge, blinking in the sunshine, just in time for graduation." As it was constructed on a slope, there are separate entrances to the building that connect directly to the first, second, third, and fourth floors. Classrooms require higher ceilings than offices, so the two wings' floors do not match up. On every floor, there is a hallway or staircase to connect the classroom wing to the office wing, and it is possible, positioned in certain areas of the building, to view five staircases, two elevators, and four hallways.

== Floor plan ==
Level	Classrooms	Offices
G		7000s
F	300s Common Grounds	6000s
E	200s	5000s
D	100s	4000s
C	1-99	3000s
B	B1–B99	2000s Ishi Court
A		1000s

The office wing consists of seven floors, A (bottom) through G (top). There are exits on levels A and B. Level B has access to Ishi Court, a courtyard in the center of the office wing. Offices have four-digit numbers. The 1000s are located on level A, the 2000s on level B, the 3000s on level C, etc. There is also an attic area in the office wing.

The classroom wing consists of five levels, B through F. There are exits on levels C and D; level B is underground. Levels C, D, and E in the classroom wing connect to levels C, D, E, and F in the office wing. Level F in the classroom wing connects directly to level G in the office wing. Classrooms have two- or three-digit numbers. Classrooms on level B have numbers beginning with "B", such as B55. Classrooms on level C have two-digit numbers. Level D consists of the 100s, level E of the 200s, and level F of the 300s. Cal Dining operates the Common Grounds cafe (temporarily closed) on level F of the classroom wing.
