= Hearst Memorial Mining Building =

- U.S. National Register of Historic Places
- Berkeley Landmark
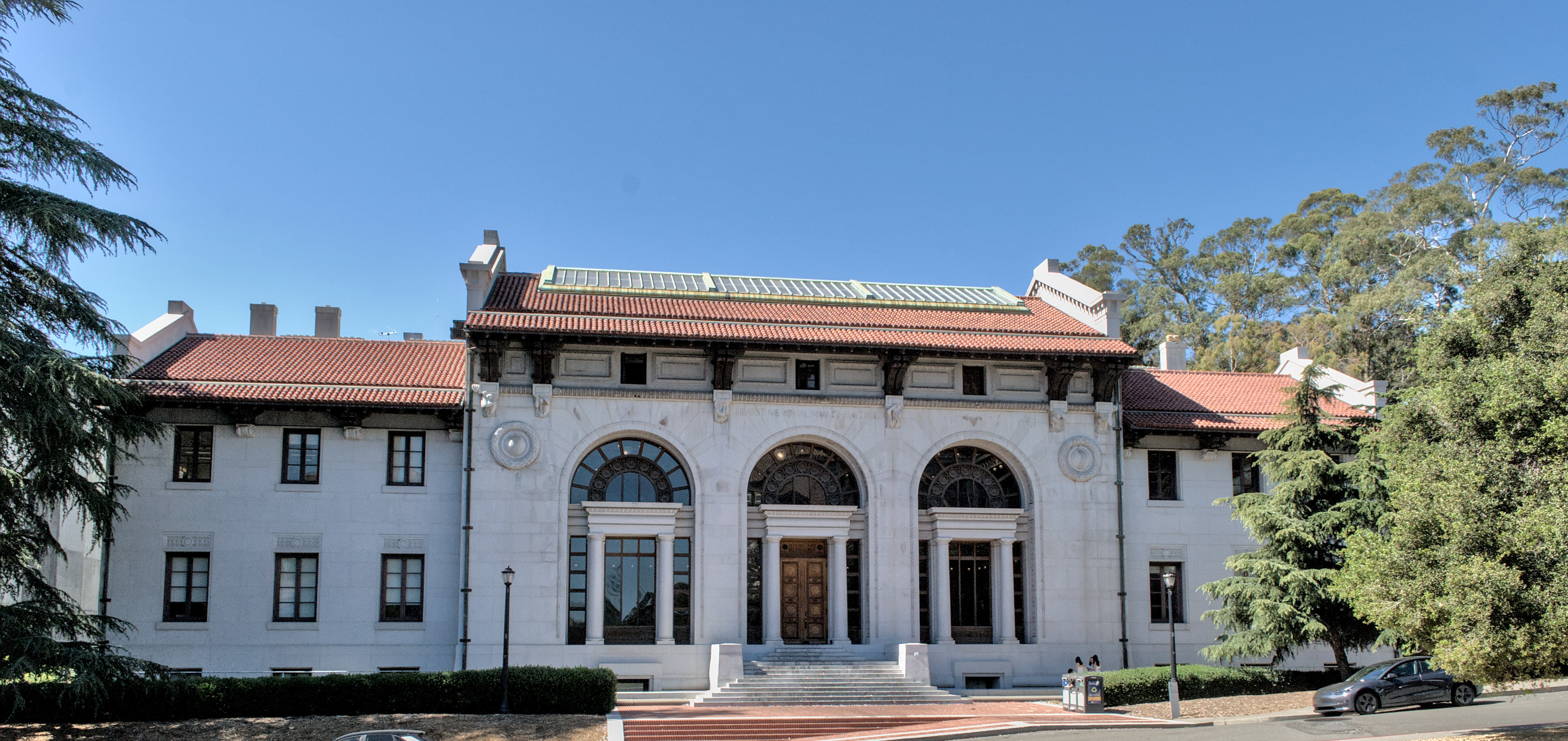
- Hearst Mining building in 2022

- Location within Oakland, California Location within California Location within the United States
- Location: Oxford St., Berkeley, California
- Coordinates: 37.8742°N 122.2571°W
- Area: 1.4 acres (0.57 ha)
- Built: 1907
- Architect: John Galen Howard
- Architectural style: Classical Revival
- MPS: Berkeley, University of California MRA
- NRHP reference No.: 82004646
- BERKL No.: 152

Significant dates
- Added to NRHP: March 25, 1982
- Designated BERKL: February 25, 1991

The Hearst Memorial Mining Building at the University of California, Berkeley, is home to the university's Materials Science and Engineering Department, with research and teaching spaces for the subdisciplines of biomaterials; chemical and electrochemical materials; computational materials; electronic, magnetic, and optical materials; and structural materials. The Beaux-Arts-style Classical Revival building is listed in the National Register of Historic Places and is designated as part of California Historical Landmark #946. It was designed by John Galen Howard, with the assistance of architect and Berkeley alumna Julia Morgan and the Dean of the College of Mines at that time, Samuel B. Christy. It was the first building on that campus designed by Howard. Construction began in 1902 as part of the Phoebe Hearst campus development plan. The building was dedicated to the memory of her husband George Hearst, who had been a successful miner.

From 1998 to 2003, the building underwent a massive renovation, expansion, and seismic retrofit, in which a platform was built underneath the building, and a suspension system capable of up to 1 meter lateral travel was installed. To keep the expansion distinct from the historic building, shot peened aluminium (rather than stone) and a more modern design were used in the new construction.

The Lawson Adit - a horizontal mining tunnel - is directly to the east of the building.

== History ==
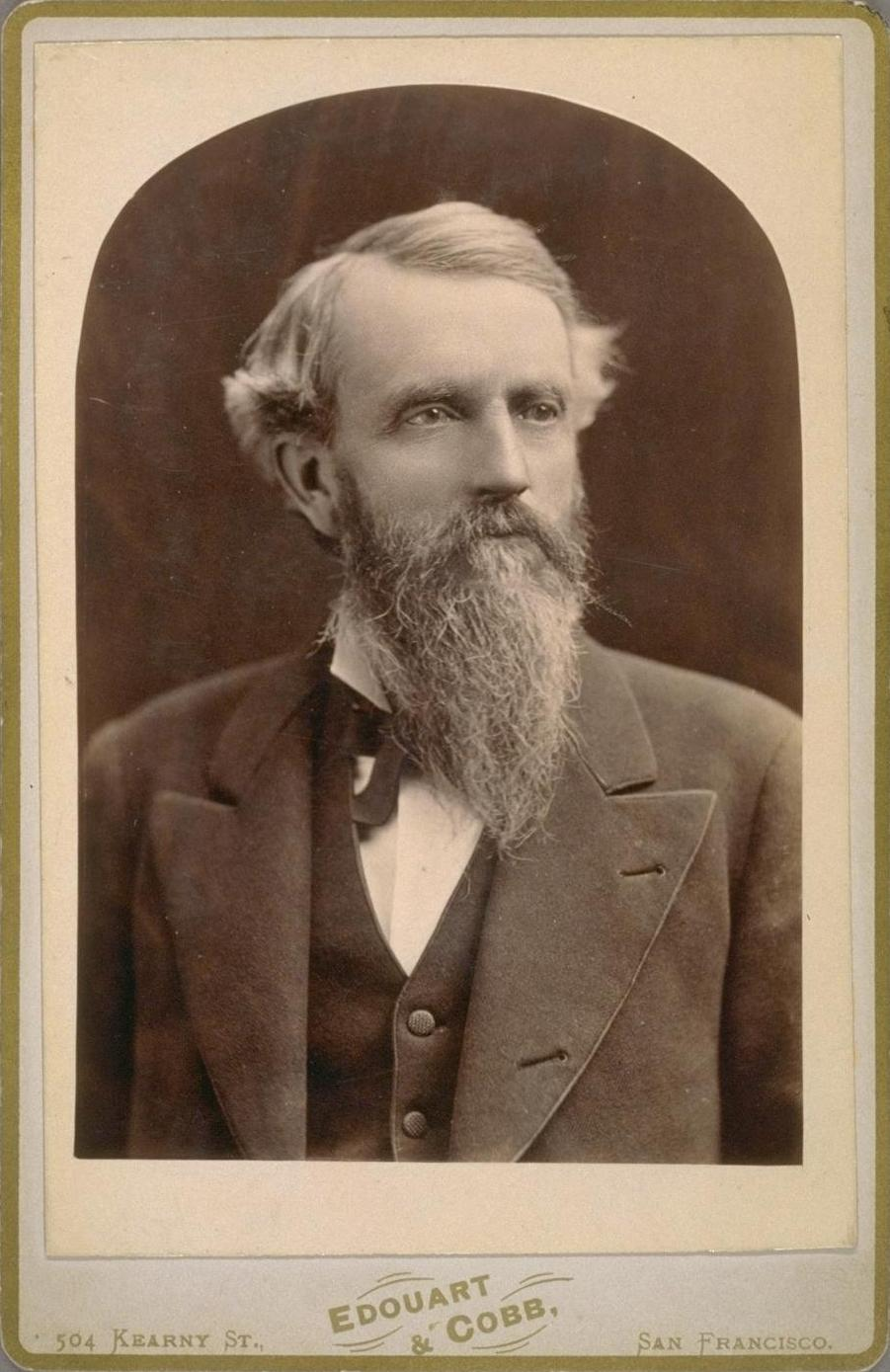
George Hearst

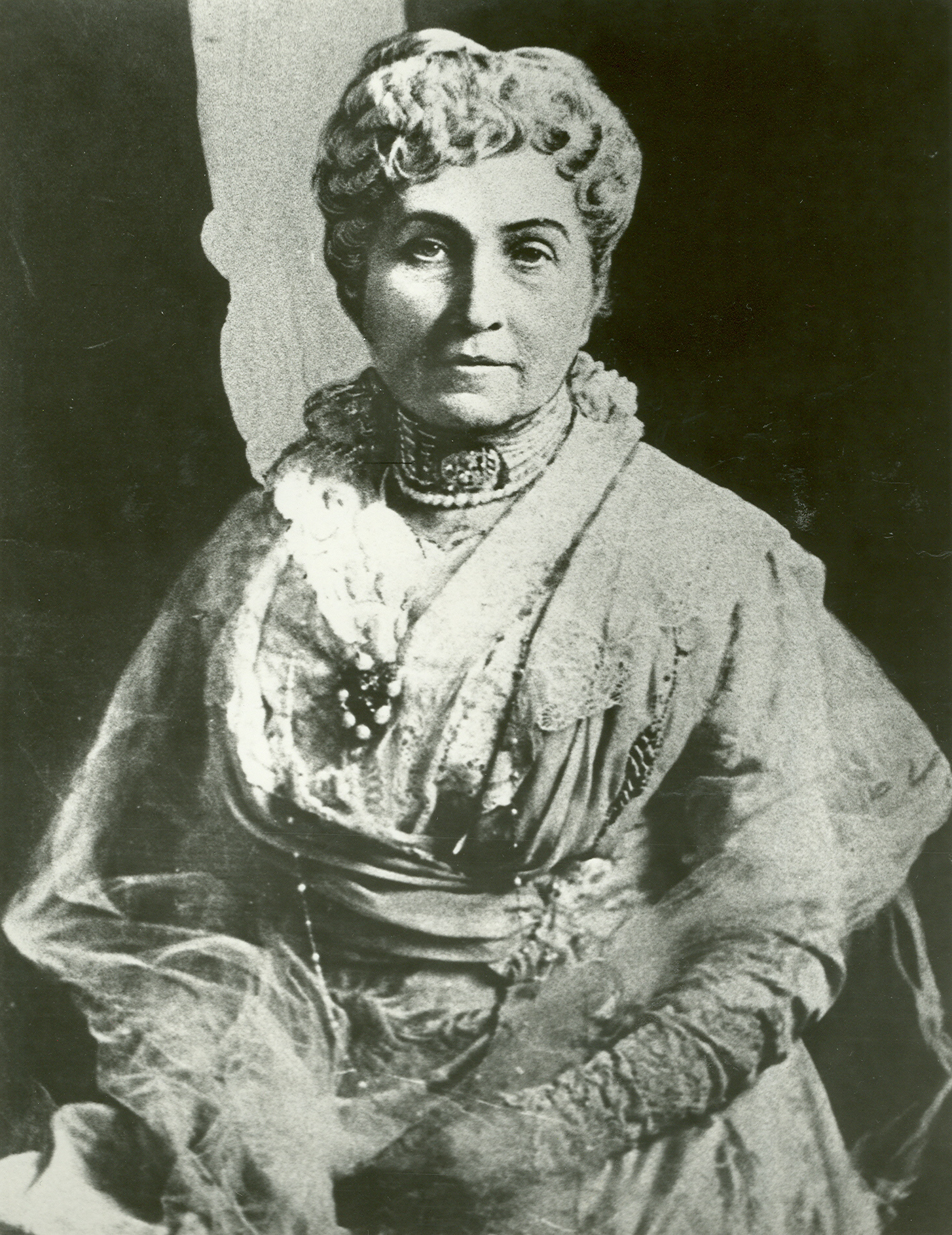
Phoebe Hearst

Construction of the Hearst Memorial Mining Building began in 1902, and the building was completed in 1907, with a dedication ceremony held on August 23 of that year. The $1.065 million construction cost was a gift of Phoebe Apperson Hearst, dedicated to the memory of her late husband, Senator George Hearst, who had made much of his fortune in mining.

When construction began in 1903, the College of Mines, with its 247 students (or 11% of the total student population at the university) was the largest of its kind in the world. The college did not have a dedicated building, and due to the size of the college, the Hearst Memorial Mining Building was chosen as the first building under the Hearst Plan to be constructed.

University architect John Galen Howard designed the building with the assistance of the Dean of the College of Mines, Professor Samuel B. Christy and Berkeley-educated architect Julia Morgan. The architects set out to create a building that harmonized classical elements with architectural innovation, building off prior examples of European and American mining building architecture, and staying true to the Beaux-Arts style that defined Howard's vision for the Hearst campus plan. In order to help them realize this vision, Hearst funded a trip for Howard and Christy to visit mining schools throughout the United States and Europe so that they could study standardized architectural forms for mining schools, as libraries and hospitals had realized in their own architectural evolution. Howard and Christy did not find many examples of mining colleges—the majority of the buildings they visited were originally built for other purposes. Howard feared that the scant number examples to study would make his design prone to the mistakes of an architectural form early in its evolution. This problem is what inspired Howard to create an "elastic" design—the building's exterior shell would be built separate from the interior, so that the interior could be modified in the future without having to scrap the shell or compromise the building's strength. Vents and chimneys were also built independent of the shell, as these architectural features were expected to have shorter lifespans than the exterior structure. California Hall, another Howard-designed building on the Berkeley campus was also constructed with an "elastic" interior form.

Selected locations on the campus of the University of California, Berkeley
- Buildings and venues
- Landmarks
1 University House (1911)
2 North Gate Hall (1906) and North Gate (1990)
3 Founders' Rock (1860)
4 Evans Hall (1971)
5 Hearst Memorial Mining Building (1907)
6 Hearst Greek Theatre (1903)
7 Crescent Lawn (1929) and Springer Plaza (1964)
8 Valley Life Sciences Building (1930)
9 Doe Memorial Library (1917)
10 South Hall (1873)
11 Sather Tower (1914)
12 Haas School of Business (1995)
13 Haas Pavilion (1933)
14 Sather Gate (1908)
15 Sproul Plaza (1962)
16 Hearst Memorial Gymnasium (1927)
17 College of Environmental Design (Bauer Wurster Hall, 1964)
18 School of Law (Boalt Hall, 1951)
19 California Memorial Stadium (1923)
20 People's Park (1969)

Howard, reflecting upon their work after the construction was complete, said:

We have sought to secure beauty not by easy masquerade and putting on of architectural stuff, but by organic composition, working from within out, and letting the heart of the thing speak ... If the expression be true, no matter how strange it may seem at first, in the end it must be seen to be inevitable.

=== Exterior design ===
The roof of the building is tiled, brackets made of timber, and ornamentation is of the classical tradition. The roof tiles are reminiscent of Spanish roofing tiles used in late (post-1790) California mission architecture. As the building's centerpiece, the center vestibule was made notable from the exterior by being made the highest point of the building's facade. Howard unified the exterior facade not by the classical elements of symmetry and hierarchy, but rather filled in voids with ornamental details. Six granite corbel sculptures created by Robert Ingersoll Aitken support the wooden roof brackets. According to Howard, the two male sculptures on the west signified "primal elements", and the two on the east "eternal forces", representative of the character of mining. The two central female sculptures provided a balancing presence, representing "the ideal art, the final flower of life--fresh, mysterious, pure--emerging from the void of chaos".

=== Interior design ===
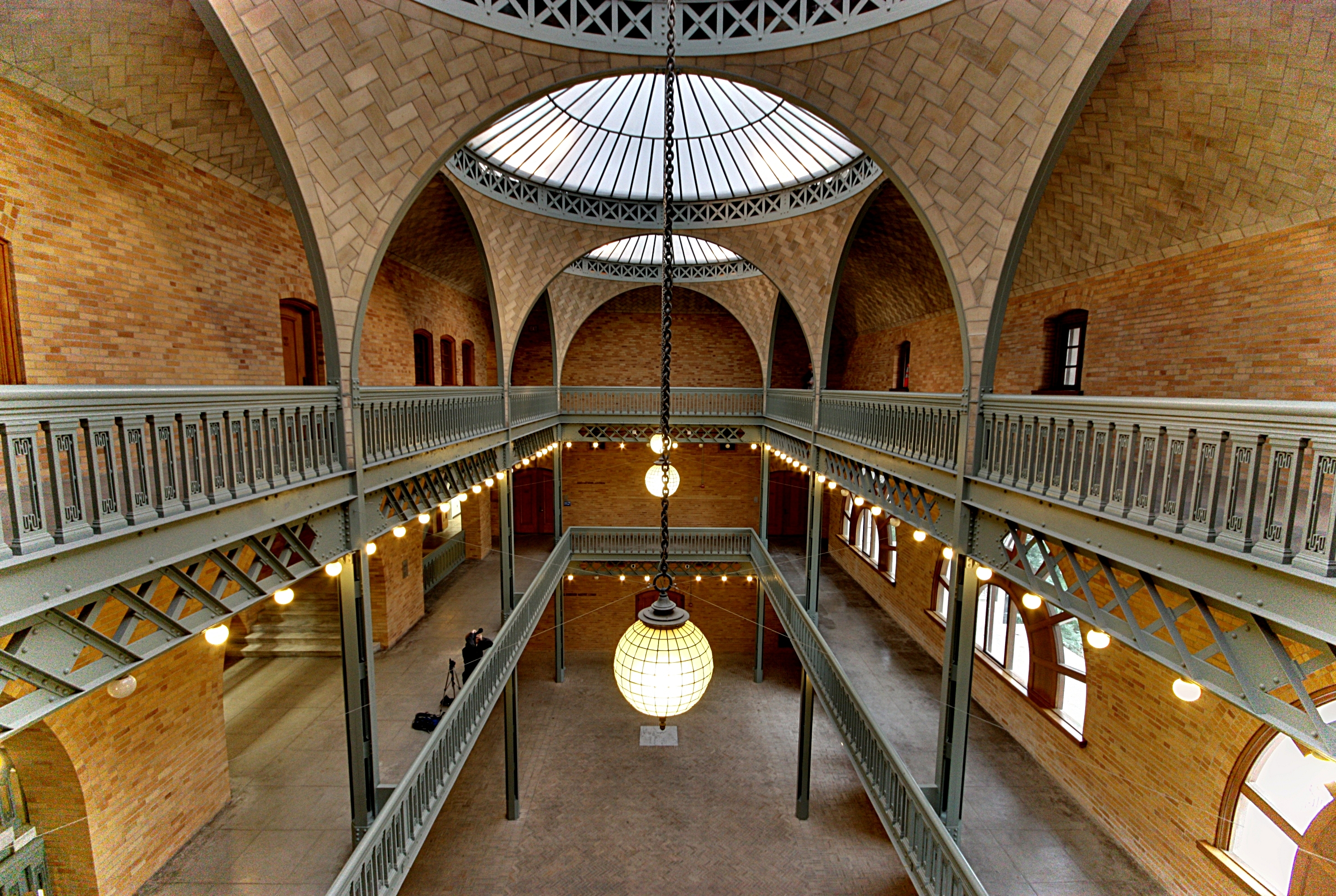
Hearst Mining building interior in 2010

The central entrance vestibule was dedicated to Senator Hearst, and was also to serve as a space for the mining museum. It was designed to recall Henri Labrouste's Reading Room in the Bibliothèque Nationale de France (1858–68). The golden oak doors that open into it from the building's exterior were intended to create a dramatic entrance into an equally dramatic, high-ceilinged space where domes 50 feet in the air are covered in buff-toned Guastavino tiles. The columns that support the internal structure are composed of steel beams, and continue through two floors of balconies lined with blue-green cast-iron railings housed upon steel lattice trusses. Construction details such as its bricks are intentionally exposed to communicate a brusk aesthetic. The Guastavino tiles were a proprietary feature to the domed structural system. They were designed by the Valencian architect Rafael Guastavino, who had immigrated to the United States in 1881, earning notability for his work in the Boston Public Library vaults in the 1890s. Howard and the Guastavino Company kept a professional correspondence prior to the construction of the mining building, and Howard hired Guastavino's workers to install the tilework.

A plaque dedicated to George Hearst was placed on the north wall of the entryway, reading:

This building stands as memorial to George Hearst, a plain honest man and good miner. The stature and mould of his life bespoke the pioneers who gave their strength to riskful search in the hard places of the earth. He had warm heart toward his fellow men and his hand was ready to kindly deed. Taking his wealth from the hills he filched from no man's store and lessened no man's opportunity.

The rooms to the south and west of the vestibule were originally administrative offices, including the Office of the Dean. Lecture halls and the museum curator's office were on the south and east sides, respectively. In the central court to the north of the vestibule was the mining laboratory, and on the east and west ends of the laboratory were the metallurgic and research labs, a library, offices and lecture space. The 3-story-tall tower at the north end of the building was used for the crushing of dry ore. Adjacent east of the tower was the copper and lead smelting laboratory, and adjacent west a gold and silver mill.

=== Symbolism ===
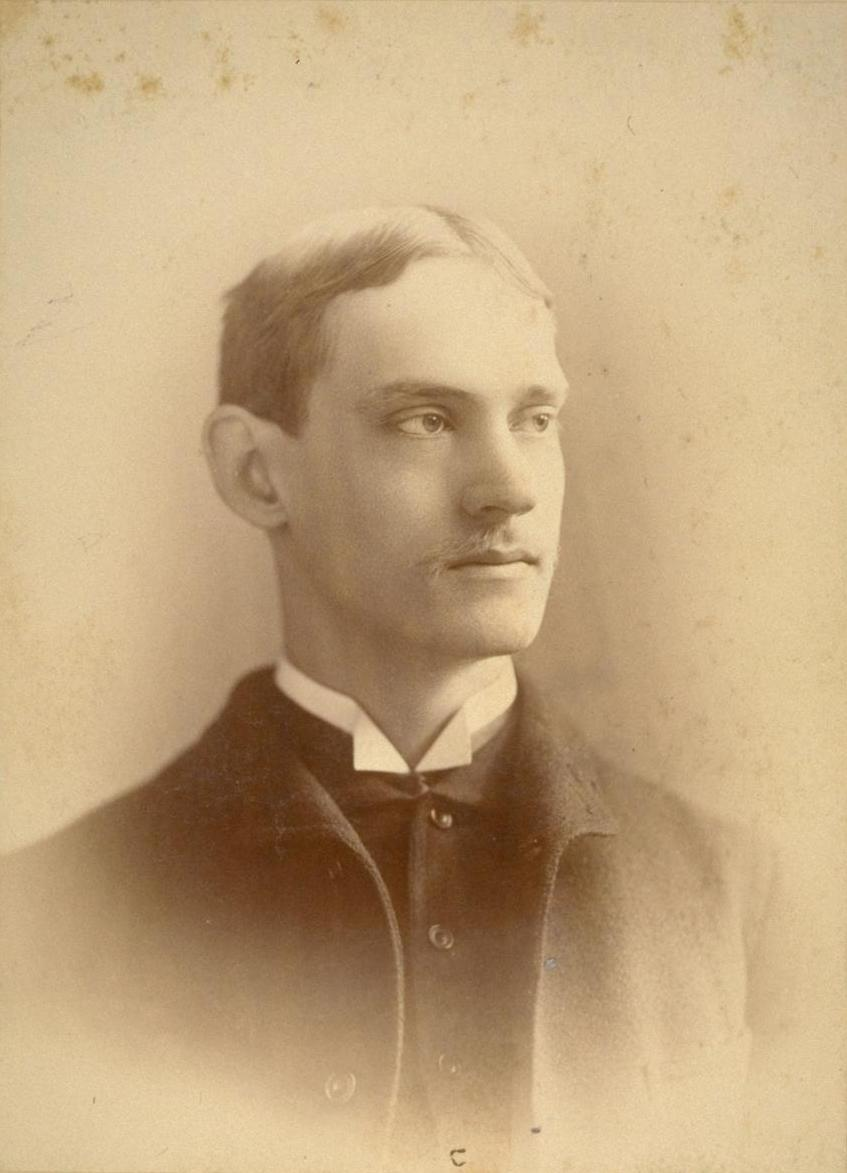
John Galen Howard, 1886

Howard gave the building a brusque, industrial aesthetic as a complement to the softer aesthetic of the other buildings in the Hearst Plan. Howard referred to the Mining Building as "the kind, bluff brother amid a bevy of lovely sisters". These architectural features were also intended to communicate the function of the building. In an interview with the University of California Magazine in 1902, 5 years before the building's dedication ceremony, Howard reflects:

The aim has been to give expression to the character of a College of Mining Engineering as distinguished from one of Art, Letters, or of Natural Science. The expression of belles-lettres in architecture demands a more purely classic character than that of scientific studies. Such a building as a library, for instance, may without inconsistency rejoice in all the sumptuous glories of Roman architecture or the Renaissance; the tradition of the world leads on naturally enough in this direction. But ... such delicate and highly organized motives find little place in a Mining Building, which demands a treatment, while no less beautiful, much more primitive, less elaborately developed in the matter of detail, less influenced by the extreme classic tradition either as a canon of proportion or as an architectonic schema. The profession of mining has to do with the very body and bone of the earth; its process is a ruthless assault upon the bowels of the world, a contest with the crudest and most rudimentary forces. There is about it something essentially elementary, something primordial; and its expression in architecture must, to be true, have something of the rude, the Cyclopean. The emotion roused must be a sense of power, rather than that of grace ... To produce a design for a Mining Building which shall in all sincerity express its purpose and at the same time harmonize with future buildings quite as sincere in the expression of their purposes--purposes in almost every case of greater amenity--this has been the aim of the architect in approaching his task in its artistic phase.
