= California Hall =

California Hall may refer to:

- California Hall (San Francisco, California)
- California Hall (UC Berkeley)

== See also ==
- California Hall of Fame
- Hall, California
