= InfoCamp =

InfoCamp is a global movement of collaborative unconferences addressing topics in information science and related fields. These so-called unconferences are unstructured, face-to-face meetings where the agenda and activities such as discussions, workshops, and presentations are determined by the participants. The informal nature of these gatherings empower the participants by shifting the power from the presenters to the people.

== Background ==
Unconferences such as InfoCamp develop around a central theme, area of interest, or community. For instance, InfoCamp focuses on information as opposed to CurateCamp, which emphasizes digital curation, and ThatCamp on technology and digital humanities. Aside from the unstructured nature of these gatherings and the control given to participants, they are also mostly free and workshop focused.

== Seattle ==
The first InfoCamp was held in Seattle in 2007.

== Berkeley ==
There have been Annual InfoCamps at the UC Berkeley School of Information since the first was held on March 6, 2010. The event takes place at South Hall.

== Berlin ==
An InfoCamp was held in Berlin, Germany.
