= California Hall (UC Berkeley) =

- U.S. National Register of Historic Places
- Berkeley Landmark
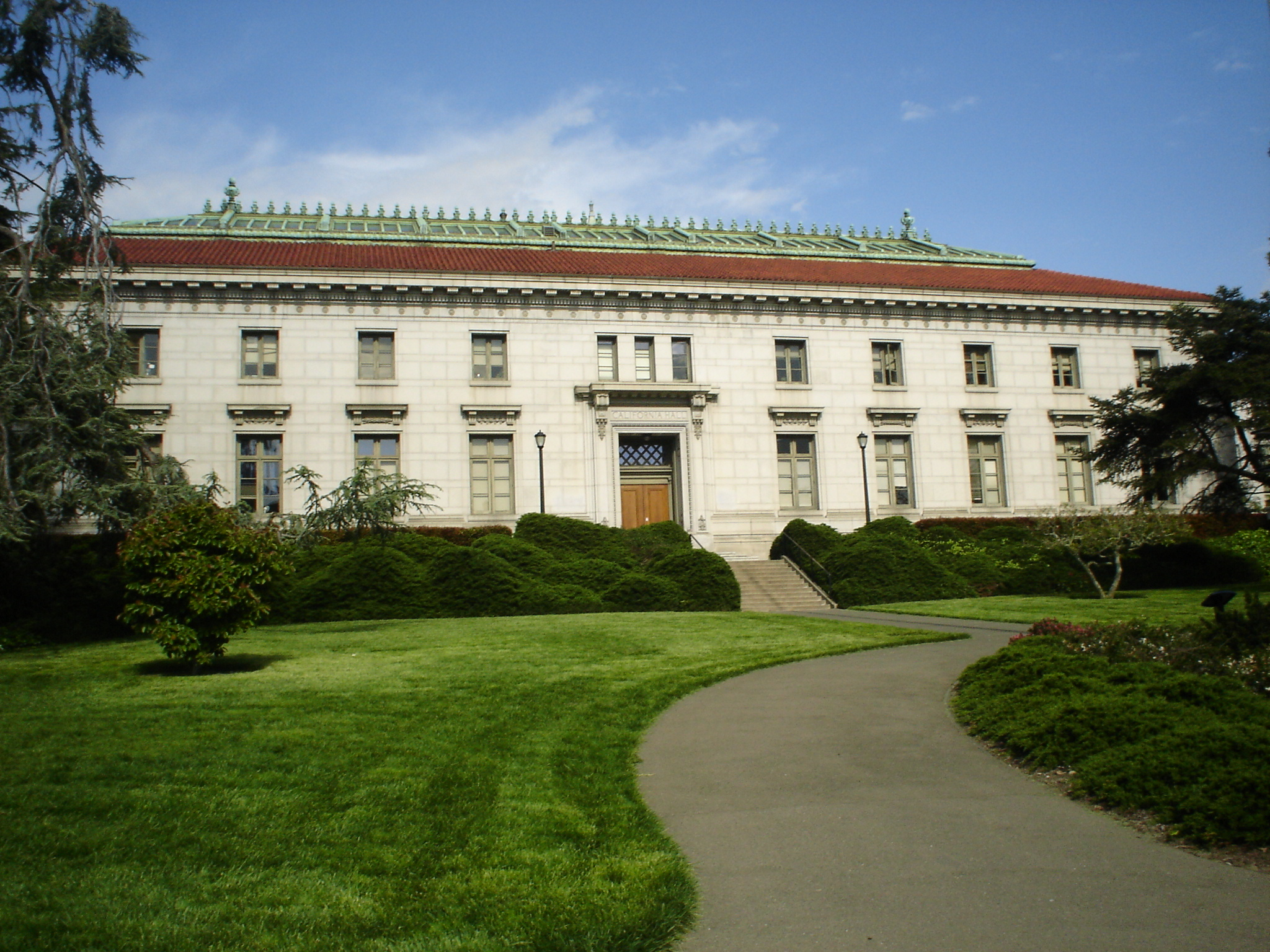
- California Hall in 2006

- Location within Oakland, California Location within California Location within the United States
- Location: University of California, Berkeley campus
- Coordinates: 37°52′18.8″N 122°15′37.4″W
- Built: August, 1905
- Architect: John Galen Howard
- Architectural style: Beaux-Arts (Classical Revival)
- NRHP reference No.: 82004638
- BERKL No.: 147
- Designated BERKL: February 25, 1991

California Hall is one of the original "classical core" Beaux-Arts-style Classical Revival buildings on the UC Berkeley campus. Construction began in 1903 under the lead of University Architect John Galen Howard after the university's adoption of the Phoebe Hearst master architectural plan for the Berkeley campus. The building opened in August, 1905. In 1982, it was named to the National Register of Historic Places, and is designated as an architectural feature of California Historic Landmark no. 946. In 1991, the Landmarks Preservation Committee of the City of Berkeley designated it Berkeley City Landmark no. 147. It currently houses the University of California Berkeley Chancellor's Office and the Graduate Division.

== History ==
California Hall was one of the first buildings to be constructed upon adoption of the Hearst architectural plan. Opened in 1905, it was built with a state appropriation of $250,000 and university funds of $19,000.

It originally housed the university's central administration and the History, Political Economy and Commerce departments. After a 1941 remodel it housed classrooms and the Institute of Industrial Relations and classrooms; in 1968 the classrooms were removed and it became the home of the Chancellor's Office and the Graduate Division. In 1982, it was added to the National Register of Historic Places. In 1990 it was seismic renovated.

=== Exterior design ===
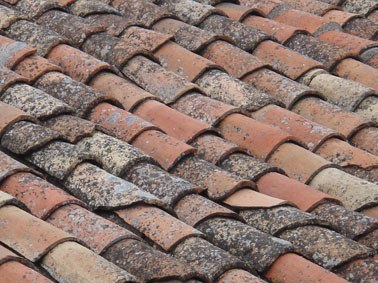
Spanish roofing tiles (tejas)

The building's frame is steel sheathed in reinforced concrete. The exterior is granite from the nearby Raymond quarries, chosen for its hardness and uniform color. The granite was then lined with brick. Granite is not fireproof, but campus plan at the time called for large spacing between buildings to reduce the threat of fire, and California Hall was the first campus building incorporating fire-proofing techniques such as metal studs, wire lath and fireproof plaster. "If there is a building in the State that is perfectly fireproof, in which a fire cannot start, or could find nothing to make headway on if possibly started, it is California Hall", claimed the University Chronicle. The roof is concrete-sheathed steel covered in Spanish mission tiles (tejas), reflecting Howard's desire to create a uniquely "Californian" architectural style. The rooftop features skylights studded by copper finials.

=== Original interior features ===
The original doors, window-casings and other wooden features of the building's interior architecture were made of solid oak, and the building's original furniture was of solid oak and mahogany. The floors were originally made of metal and concrete, and carpeted in cork. The entire building was wired for electric lighting, which was intended for use in the evenings. Light during the day was provided by ample windows (one in each room) and the skylights dotting the rooftop. Similar to the Hearst Memorial Mining Building being built on the university campus by Howard at the same time, the interior was made to be architecturally "elastic"—these same subdivisions could be cheaply and easily removed without compromising the structure's exterior steel shell.

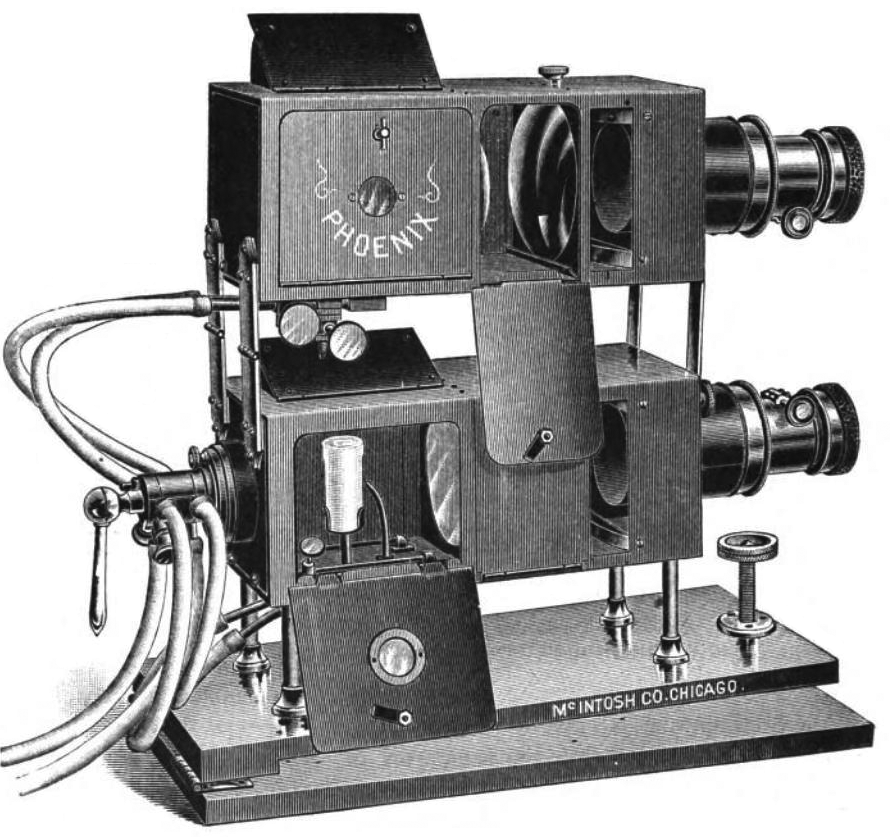
Phoenix Stereopticon

The main entrance on the west side of the building opened to a first-floor lobby that had marble paneling in a wainscot fashion. The doors to the original lecture room on the north end of the first floor were made of solid oak.

The lecture room had tiered seating that could hold 500 people, and was originally equipped with a stereopticon. The room was intended for the university's large History, English and Botany classes, which were difficult to accommodate previously due to a lack of adequate indoor space on the campus. Behind the speaker's platform was a door that allowed the speaker and the audience direct access between the lecture room and the outside of the building. To the south of the large lecture hall were classrooms and faculty offices, uniformly painted ivory in color.

The second-floor corridor, lit by skylights, was inspired by the plan of an atrium of an ancient Roman house. The corridor served as a central lobby connecting together the university's administrative offices, including the recently founded Recorder's Office and Secretary's Office. The university's information bureau and a private telephone exchange were located across from the stairwell that lead up into the lobby. From the south end of the central lobby, one could enter into the Faculty Room, where meetings and conferences were held. Connected to the Faculty Room were the private office of the President, the President's Secretary's office, and the office of the President's stenographer. The furniture in these rooms was made of mahogany. Located to the north of the central lobby were a lecture room and the offices of the Department of Education. To the northeast and east were the offices of the Appointment Secretary, the Advisor, Assistant Advisor, Medical Examiner and Professor of Hygiene, and the Director of the University Extension at that time, Professor H. Morse Stephens.

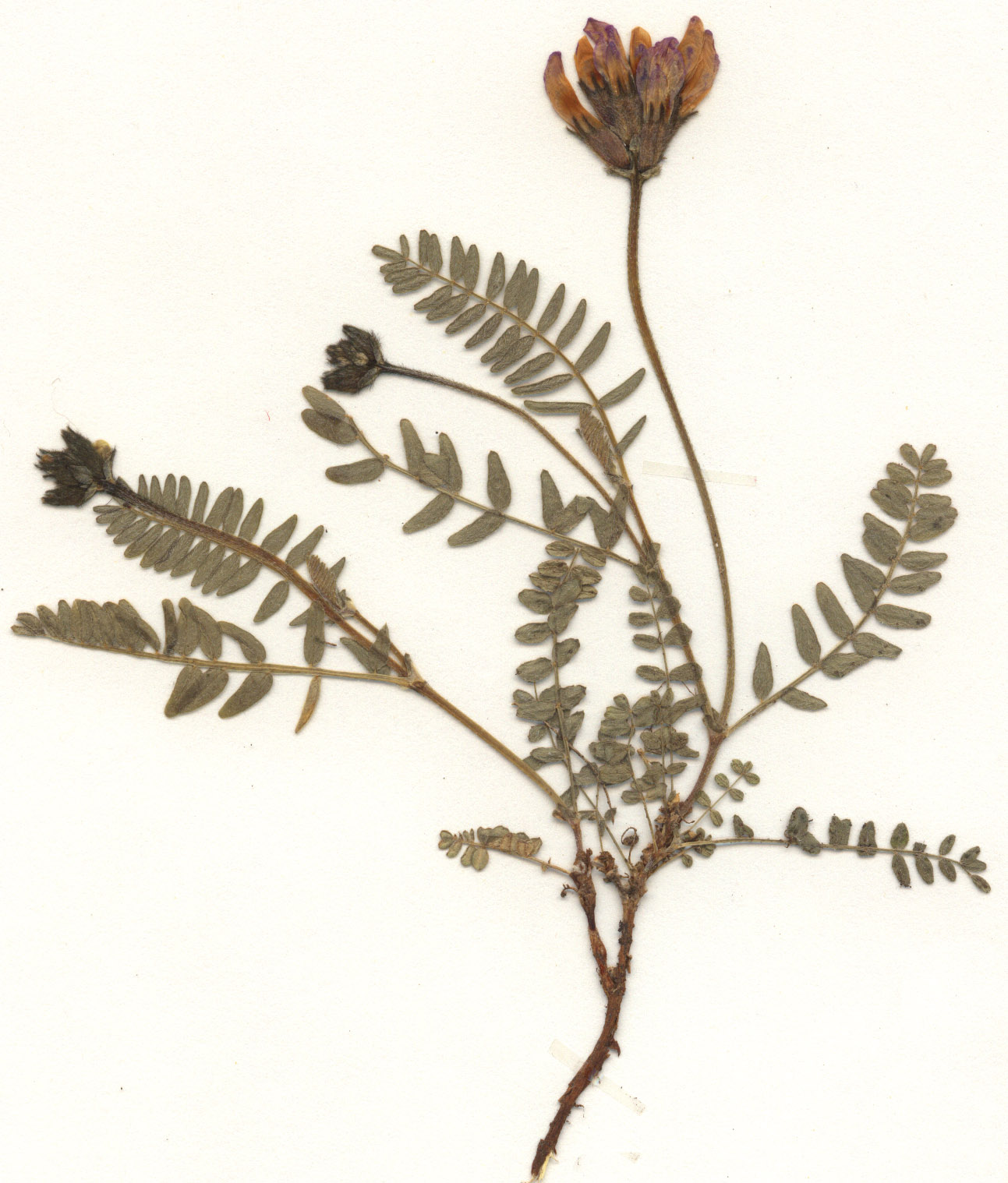
Example of a pressed herbarium specimen (Astragalus danicus Herbar)

On the top floor of the building were the headquarters of the University Press and Editorial Committee, and the Botanical Museum (herbarium), which was brought there to protect it from fire. The attic was fitted with steel bookshelves in 1906, becoming the first on-campus location of the recently acquired Bancroft Library, which had previously been housed in San Francisco.

In the basement, one could find the mailing room for University Extension, storage for the Department of Paleontology's collections, and restrooms. The basement is also where the heating and ventilation chambers could be found. This system drew in outside air, filtering it through a fine cloth mesh to remove dust, and was warmed after being passed across the surface of steam coils. The steam was supplied from the university's central power plant, and was used instead of gas as a fire safety precaution. A large revolving fan pushed the heated air through the ventilation system, with units installed in each of the rooms throughout the entire building. This heating and ventilation system was unique on the campus at that time to California Hall.

== Architect ==
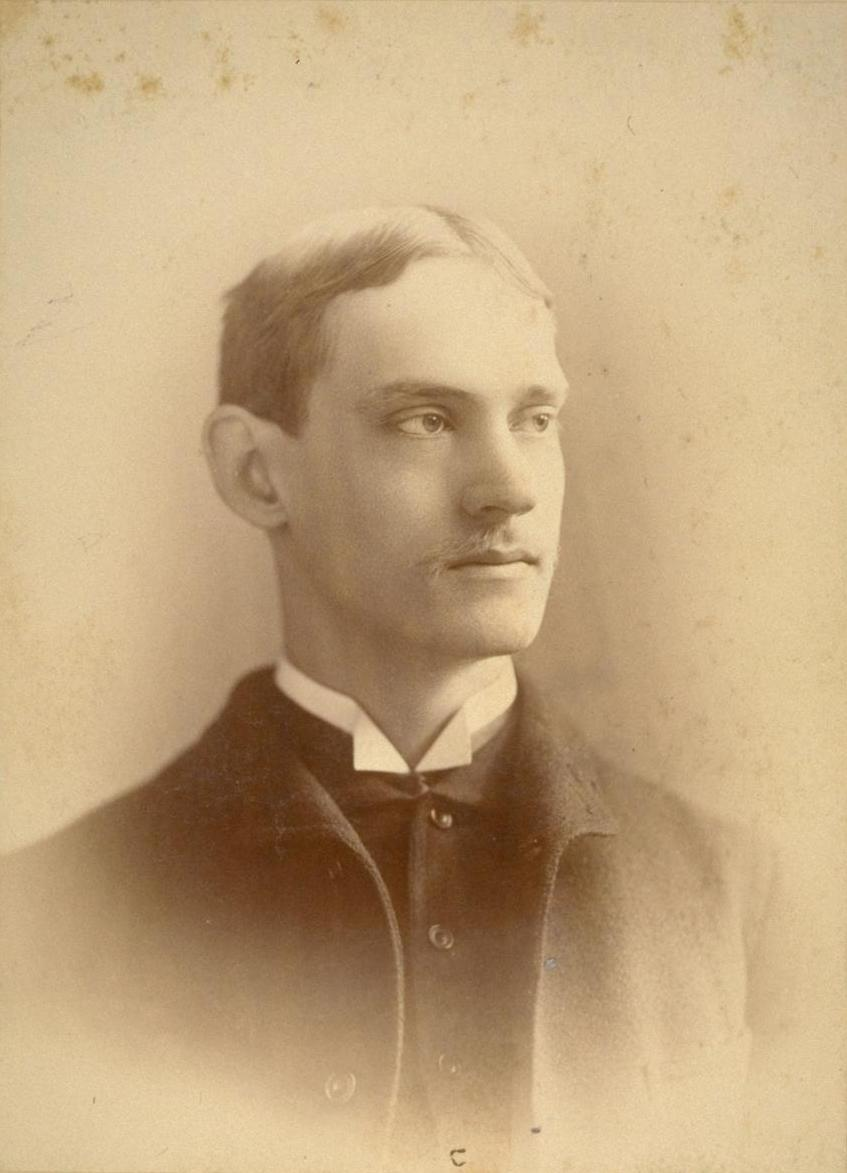
John Galen Howard, 1886

Howard was member to an architectural trend of his time of a search for an authentic, modern "California" style. Previous architects had drawn heavily from Spanish California mission architecture, Stanford University being a prime example of this Mission Revival style. Howard said of California Hall that it was a:

free study of modified classic forms without recourse to ... columnar orders. An attempt has been made to realize in this building a type of architecture characteristic to Central California.

The University Chronicle alluded to the building's strength and elements of Classical Revival explored by Howard through a parallel with the Greek Parthenon:

It can safely be said that no building in the State better represents the most modern and advanced ideas of durable construction. It has been built to be permanent, and will be permanent as the Parthenon has been permanent, and will be used by generations of students hundreds of years hence.
