= Founders' Rock =

- U.S. National Register of Historic Places
- California Historical Landmark
- Berkeley Landmark
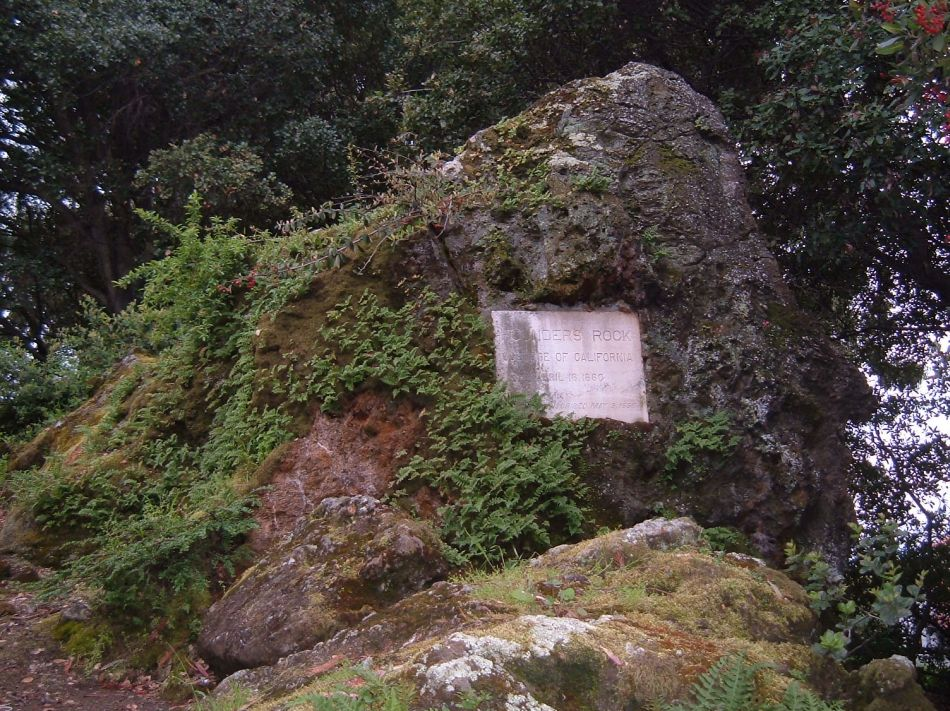
- Founders' Rock

- Location within Oakland, California Location within California Location within the United States
- Location: Berkeley, California, U.S.
- Coordinates: 37.8753333°N 122.2568815°W
- MPS: University of California, Berkeley MRA
- NRHP reference No.: 82004642
- CHISL No.: N1067
- BERKL No.: 149

Significant dates
- Added to NRHP: March 25, 1982
- Designated CHISL: March 25, 1982
- Designated BERKL: February 25, 1991

Founders' Rock is a historical site located on the corner of Hearst Avenue and Gayley Road, in Berkeley, California, U.S.. The spot, according to college lore, where the 12 trustees of the College of California, the nascent University of California, Berkeley, stood on April 16, 1860, to dedicate the property they had just purchased. This is, supposedly, the same spot where Frederick H. Billings stood in 1866 when he remembered Bishop Berkeley's verse — "Westward the course of empire takes its way" — and thus inspired the name of the new city.

A plaque was put on this spot on Charter Day in 1896, by the graduating class. It is listed as one of the National Register of Historic Places since March 25, 1982; listed as a California Historical Landmark since March 25, 1982; and a Berkeley Landmark since February 25, 1991.
