= Wheeler Hall =

- U.S. National Register of Historic Places
- Berkeley Landmark
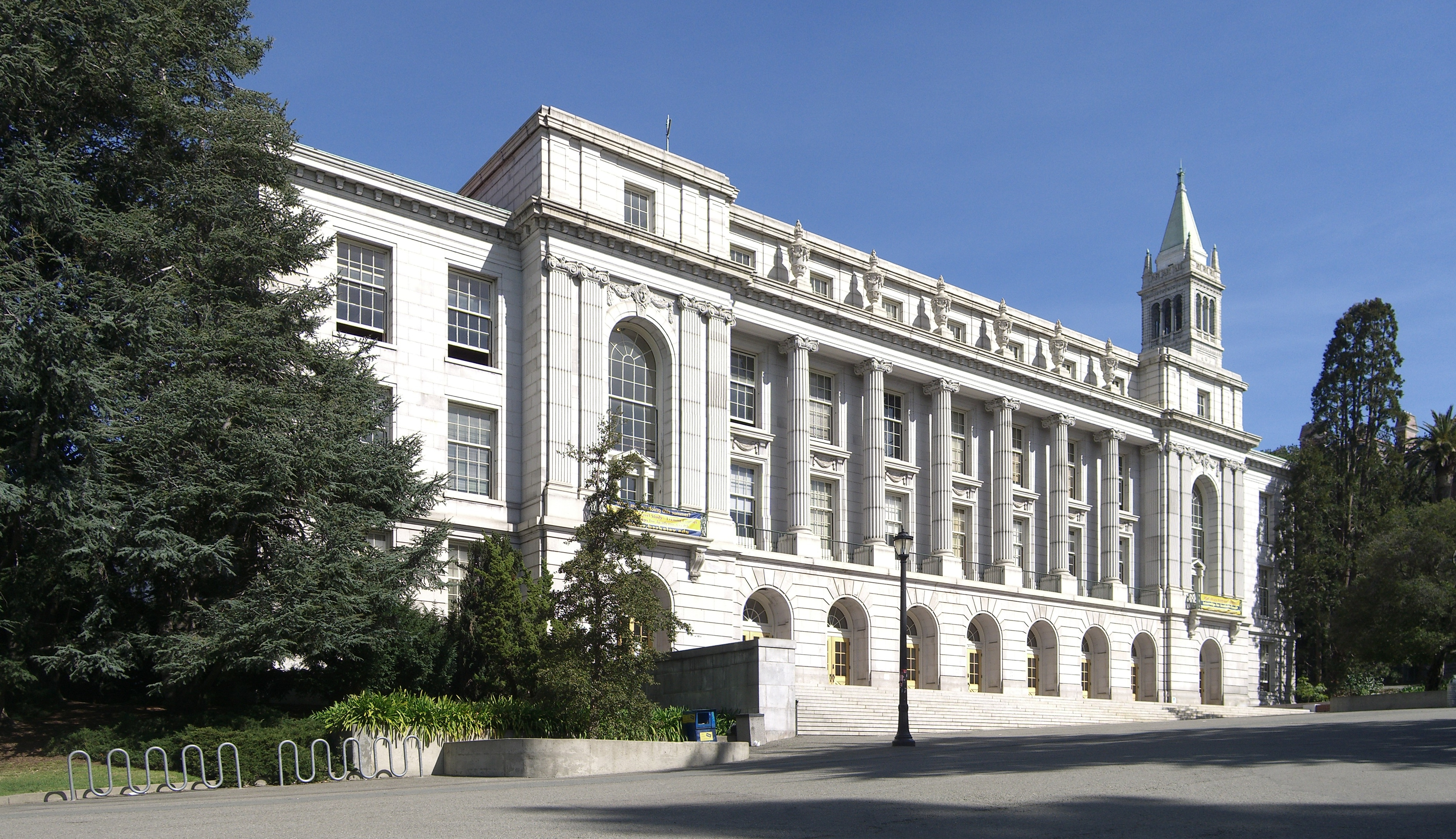
- Front of Wheeler Hall

- Location within Oakland, California Location within California Location within the United States
- Location: Berkeley, California
- Coordinates: 37°52′15.7″N 122°15′32.6″W
- NRHP reference No.: 82004654
- BERKL No.: 163

Significant dates
- Added to NRHP: March 25, 1982
- Designated BERKL: January 13, 1986

Wheeler Hall is a building on the campus of the University of California, Berkeley in Berkeley, California in the Classical Revival style. Home to the English department as well as the university's College Writing Programs department, it was named for the philologist and university president Benjamin Ide Wheeler.

The building was opened in 1917. It houses the largest lecture hall on the Berkeley campus, Wheeler Auditorium.

On February 29, 1940, UC Berkeley professor Ernest O. Lawrence received the Nobel Prize in Physics in Wheeler Auditorium from Carl Edvard Wallerstedt, Consul General of Sweden, due to the danger of crossing the Atlantic during World War II. The building was the site of many of the Free Speech Movement protests in the 1960s and is a focal point of the Berkeley campus. In the 2010s, it has been the site of many university protests and several building takeovers.

== Description ==
Wheeler Hall, located just west of South Hall, is a grand four-story building featuring a steel frame and a granite exterior. It is aligned with the main campus axis, with its square design interrupted by the projecting end bays on the east and west sides. The main south-facing facade showcases a central section with seven uniform bays, flanked by slightly projecting bays with arched windows and paired pilasters. Secondary blocks with tiled hip roofs and quoins border this central section. Steps integrated into the slopes form a partial plinth, leveling the site.

The facade's central part has three horizontal zones. The base is rusticated and includes nine deeply recessed, arched entrances leading to the lobby. Above this, the middle section spans two stories and includes a colonnaded gallery in a modified giant Ionic style. This gallery is bordered by end bays featuring paired Ionic pilasters and recessed, round-beaded windows. The attic story, set back from the classical entablature, features six monumental urns over the columns below.

Following the middle zone's layout, the attic story is highlighted by fluted pilasters that support a molded cornice capped by a blank frieze.

Inside, the southwest side of the building contains a lobby and a large auditorium encircled by a wide hall. The second and third floors have hallways providing access to the balcony. While there have been some interior modifications, these changes have not affected the building's exterior architectural integrity.
