= South Hall (UC Berkeley) =

- U.S. National Register of Historic Places
- Berkeley Landmark
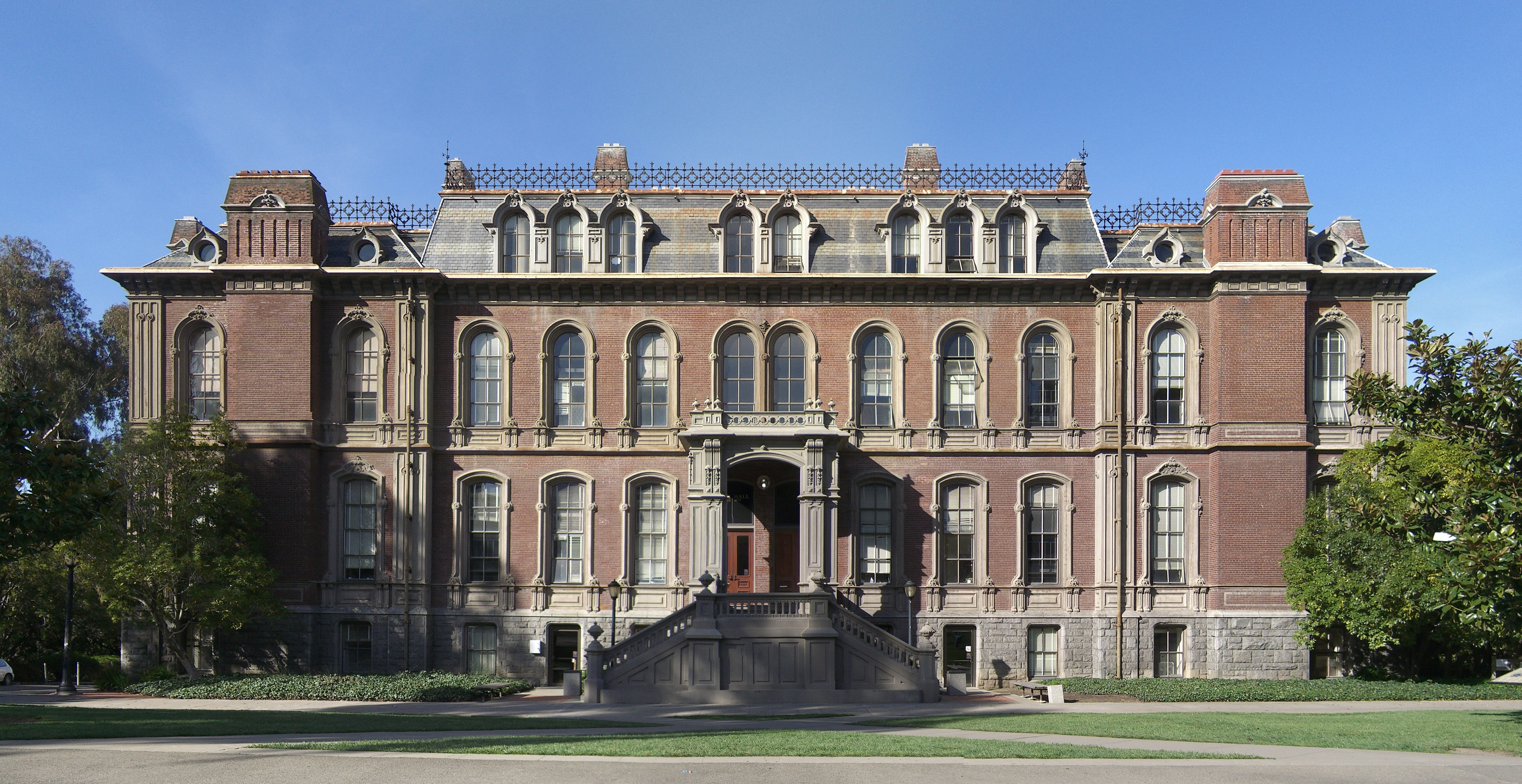
- Front of South Hall
- Location: Berkeley, California
- Coordinates: 37°52′16.78″N 122°15′30.59″W
- Built: 1873
- Architects: Farquharson & Kenitzer
- Architectural style: Second Empire
- MPS: Berkeley, University of California MRA
- NRHP reference No.: 82004651
- BERKL No.: 160

Significant dates
- Added to NRHP: March 25, 1982
- Designated BERKL: February 25, 1991

South Hall is the oldest building on the campus of the University of California, Berkeley, built in 1873 in the Napoleon III style. It is the only remaining building of the original campus. South Hall was originally the counterpart of North Hall, which no longer exists, but was located where the Bancroft Library currently stands.

The first physics laboratory in the United States was hosted in South Hall in 1879, according to UC Berkeley, however Edward Charles Pickering had established his physical laboratory later named the Rogers Laboratory of Physics at MIT in 1869. It also has been home to the College of Agriculture, a business school, and a temporary museum for the state geological survey. It currently houses the UC Berkeley School of Information. When Wheeler Hall was planned, the entrance of South Hall was removed from the west side and added on the east side entrance. The original wooden porch was replaced in 1997 with glass fiber reinforced concrete.

Campus tour guides often point out a small stone bear, sculpted by Michael H. Casey, in the architecture of South Hall, on the balcony railing above the entrance, in the third circle from the left, claiming it is the smallest bear statue on campus.

The four-story building is located southwest of Sather Tower.
