= Corder Building =

Historic building in Berkeley, California

- U.S. National Register of Historic Places
- Berkeley Landmark
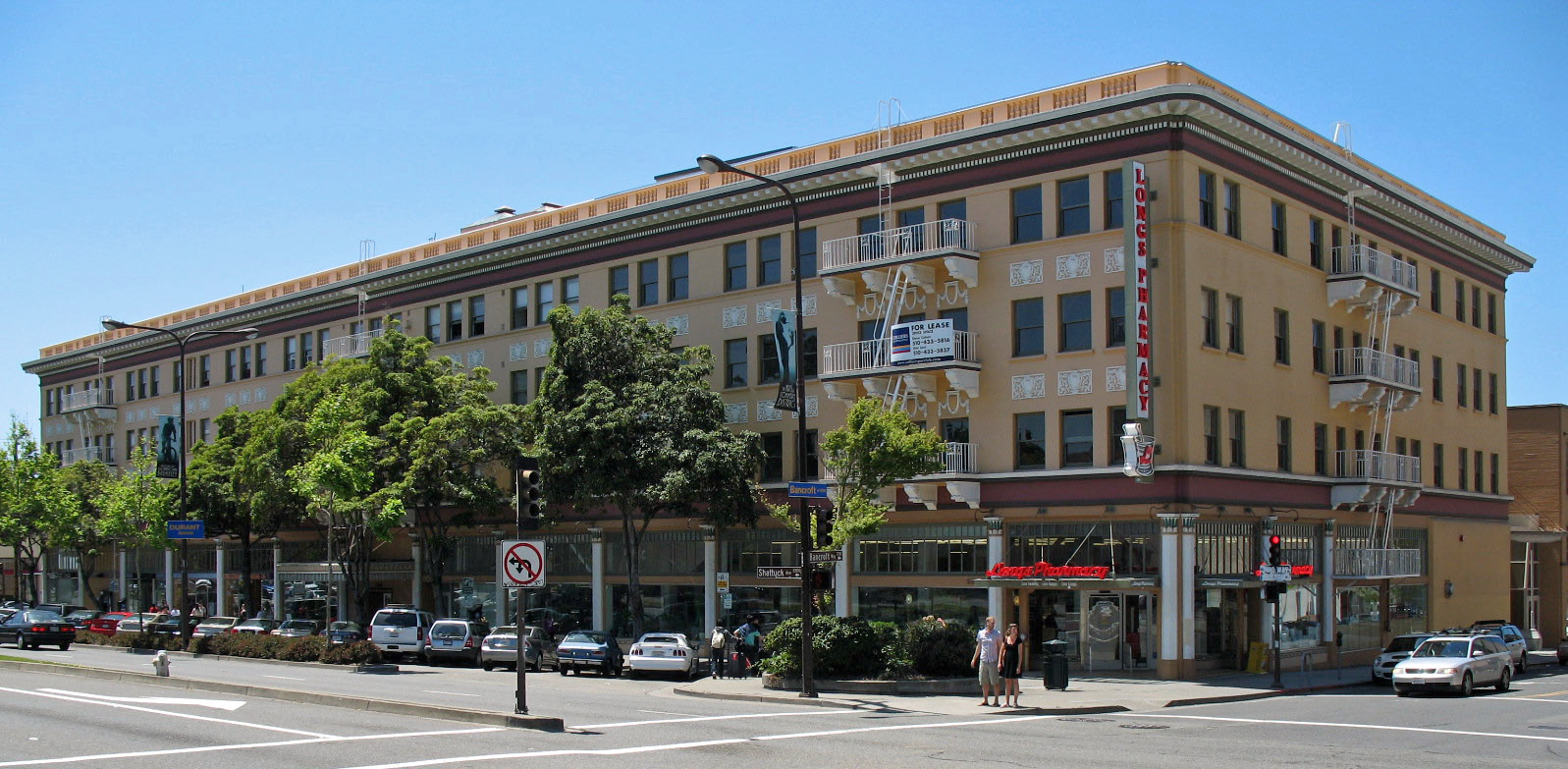
- Corder Building

- Location within Oakland, California Location within California Location within the United States
- Location: 2300–2350 Shattuck Ave, Berkeley, California
- Coordinates: 37.867092°N 122.268047°W
- Built: 1900; 126 years ago
- Architect: James W. Plachek
- Architectural style: Classical revival
- NRHP reference No.: 82002158
- BERKL No.: 44

Significant dates
- Added to NRHP: January 11, 1982
- Designated BERKL: October 29, 1981

The Corder Building is a historical English Cottage building in downtown Berkeley, California. The Corder brick building was built in 1900. The building was listed on the National Register of Historic Places on January 11, 1982. The Classical revival building was designed by James W. Plachek. James W. Plachek designed a number of other buildings in Berkeley, including: Berkeley Public Library, New Hotel Carquinez, UC Theatre, Chamber of Commerce Building, schools, and civic buildings. Architect James W. Plachek office was in the Heywood Building. The Corder Building has been updated and is now the Shattuck Apartments on the upper floors and a pharmacy on the ground floor.

== See also ==
- National Register of Historic Places listings in Alameda County, California
- List of Berkeley Landmarks in Berkeley, California

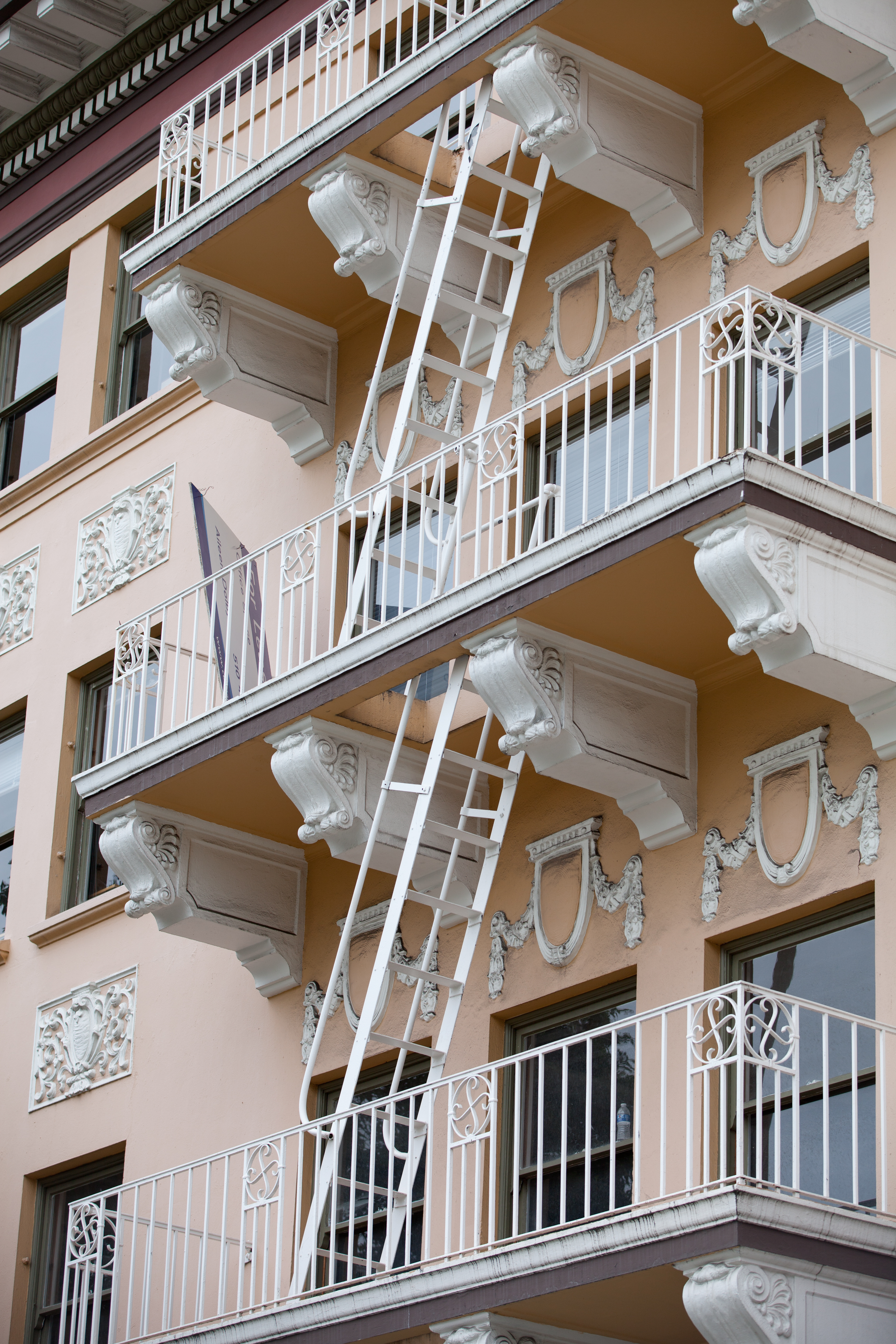
Corder Building
