= National Register of Historic Places listings in Alameda County, California =

Location of Alameda County in California

This is a list of the National Register of Historic Places listings in Alameda County, California.

This is intended to be a complete list of the properties and districts on the National Register of Historic Places in Alameda County, California, United States. Latitude and longitude coordinates are provided for many National Register properties and districts; these locations may be seen together in an online map.

There are 164 properties and districts listed on the National Register in the county, including 8 National Historic Landmarks. Another property which was once listed has been removed.

This National Park Service list is complete through NPS recent listings posted November 6, 2026.

== Color markings (highest noted listing) ==
US National Register of Historic Places
National Historic Landmark

== Current listings ==
	Name on the Register	Image	Date listed	Location	City or town	Description
1	10th Street Market	10th Street Market	August 3, 2001 (#01000826)	901–921 Washington St. 37°48′05″N 122°16′29″W	Oakland	
2	The Abbey-Joaquin Miller House	The Abbey-Joaquin Miller House	October 15, 1966 (#66000204)	Joaquin Miller Rd. and Sanborn Dr. 37°48′38″N 122°11′35″W	Oakland	1889 home of author and poet Joaquin Miller
3	Alameda City Hall	Alameda City Hall	October 14, 1980 (#80000791)	Santa Clara Ave. and Oak St. 37°45′59″N 122°14′37″W	Alameda	
4	Alameda County Building and Loan Association Building	Alameda County Building and Loan Association Building	April 12, 2016 (#16000152)	1601-1605 Clay St. 37°48′24″N 122°16′22″W	Oakland	
5	Alameda Free Library	Alameda Free Library	June 25, 1982 (#82002152)	2264 Santa Clara Ave. 37°45′57″N 122°14′37″W	Alameda	
6	Alameda High School	Alameda High School	May 12, 1977 (#77000280)	2200 Central Ave. 37°45′55″N 122°14′45″W	Alameda	
7	Alameda Veterans' Memorial Building	Alameda Veterans' Memorial Building	September 27, 2007 (#07000995)	2203 Central Ave. 37°45′58″N 122°14′47″W	Alameda	
8	Altenheim	Altenheim	January 10, 2007 (#06001218)	1720 MacArthur Blvd. 37°48′03″N 122°13′15″W	Oakland	
9	American Bag Co.-Union Hide Co.	American Bag Co.-Union Hide Co.	August 13, 1999 (#99000896)	299 Third St. 37°47′42″N 122°16′20″W	Oakland	
10	Anna Head School for Girls	Anna Head School for Girls	August 11, 1980 (#80000795)	2538 Channing Way; 37°52′00″N 122°15′26″W	Berkeley	
11	Thomas Foxwell Bachelder Barn	Thomas Foxwell Bachelder Barn	April 15, 1994 (#94000359)	1011 Kilkare Rd. 37°36′35″N 121°53′44″W	Sunol	
12	Bank of Italy	Bank of Italy	November 16, 1978 (#78000648)	2250 1st St. 37°40′57″N 121°46′07″W	Livermore	
13	The Bellevue-Staten	The Bellevue-Staten	December 27, 1991 (#91001896)	492 Staten Ave. 37°48′29″N 122°15′14″W	Oakland	
14	Berkeley Day Nursery	Berkeley Day Nursery	September 15, 1977 (#77000281)	2031 6th St. 37°52′02″N 122°17′50″W	Berkeley	
15	Berkeley High School Campus Historic District	Berkeley High School Campus Historic District	January 7, 2008 (#07001350)	1980 Allston Wy. 37°52′08″N 122°16′16″W	Berkeley	
16	Berkeley Hillside Club	Berkeley Hillside Club	April 16, 2004 (#04000332)	2286 Cedar St. 37°52′44″N 122°15′54″W	Berkeley	
17	Berkeley Historic Civic Center District	Berkeley Historic Civic Center District	December 3, 1998 (#98000963)	Roughly bounded by McKinney Ave., Addison St., Shattuck Ave., and Kittredge St. 37°52′10″N 122°16′14″W	Berkeley	
18	Berkeley Public Library	Berkeley Public Library	June 25, 1982 (#82002156)	2090 Kittredge St. 37°52′05″N 122°16′07″W	Berkeley	
19	Berkeley Women's City Club	Berkeley Women's City Club	October 28, 1977 (#77000282)	2315 Durant Ave. 37°52′03″N 122°15′46″W	Berkeley	
20	Boone's University School	Boone's University School	November 1, 1982 (#82000994)	2029 Durant Ave. 37°52′01″N 122°16′08″W	Berkeley	Now the Persian Center
21	Bowles Hall	Bowles Hall	March 16, 1989 (#89000195)	Stadium and Gayley Way; 37°52′24″N 122°15′11″W	Berkeley	
22	Brooklyn Presbyterian Church	Brooklyn Presbyterian Church	September 18, 2017 (#100001600)	1433 12th Ave. 37°47′28″N 122°14′50″W	Oakland	
23	California Cotton Mills Company Factory	California Cotton Mills Company Factory	January 30, 2013 (#12001234)	1091 Calcot Pl. 37°46′54″N 122°14′17″W	Oakland	
24	California Hall	California Hall	March 25, 1982 (#82004638)	Oxford St. 37°52′19″N 122°15′37″W	Berkeley	
25	California Hotel	California Hotel	June 30, 1988 (#88000969)	3443–3501 San Pablo Ave. 37°49′34″N 122°16′43″W	Oakland	
26	California Memorial Stadium	California Memorial Stadium	November 27, 2006 (#06001086)	Bet. Piedmont Ave., Stadium Rim Way, Canyon Rd., Bancroft Way and Prospect St. 37°52′16″N 122°15′03″W	Berkeley	
27	California Nursery Co. Guest House	California Nursery Co. Guest House	May 6, 1971 (#71000130)	California Nursery Co., Niles Blvd. at Nursery Ave. 37°34′45″N 121°59′30″W	Fremont	
28	Camron-Stanford House	Camron-Stanford House	June 13, 1972 (#72000213)	1426 Lakeside Dr. 37°48′05″N 122°15′44″W	Oakland	
29	Casa Peralta	Casa Peralta	January 4, 1982 (#82002168)	384 W. Estudillo Ave. 37°43′27″N 122°09′30″W	San Leandro	
30	Chamber of Commerce Building	Chamber of Commerce Building	August 29, 1985 (#85001916)	2140–2144 Shattuck Ave. & 2071–2089 Center St. 37°52′14″N 122°16′08″W	Berkeley	
31	Church of the Good Shepherd-Episcopal	Church of the Good Shepherd-Episcopal	December 1, 1986 (#86003361)	1001 Hearst St. at Ninth St. 37°52′12″N 122°17′41″W	Berkeley	
32	City Hall	City Hall	September 11, 1981 (#81000142)	2134 Martin Luther King Jr. Way; 37°52′09″N 122°16′24″W	Berkeley	1907 building by John Bakewell, Jr. and Arthur Brown, Jr.; renamed the Maudelle Shirek Building, March 2007
33	Claremont Country Club		January 12, 2026 (#100012537)	5295 Broadway Terrace; 37°50′14″N 122°14′52″W	Oakland	
34	Clay Building	Clay Building	November 20, 1978 (#78000650)	1001–1007 Clay St. 37°48′10″N 122°16′31″W	Oakland	
35	Cloyne Court Hotel	Cloyne Court Hotel	December 24, 1992 (#92001718)	2600 Ridge Rd. 37°52′34″N 122°15′29″W	Berkeley	
36	Alfred H. Cohen House	Alfred H. Cohen House	June 19, 1973 (#73000394)	1440 29th Ave. 37°46′47″N 122°13′41″W	Oakland	
37	College Women's Club	College Women's Club	January 21, 1982 (#82002157)	2680 Bancroft Way; 37°52′08″N 122°15′18″W	Berkeley	1928 building by Walter T. Steilberg; now known as the Bancroft Hotel
38	Corder Building	Corder Building	January 11, 1982 (#82002158)	2300–2350 Shattuck Ave. 37°52′02″N 122°16′05″W	Berkeley	
39	Cowell Memorial Hospital	Cowell Memorial Hospital	January 6, 1993 (#92001730)	2215 College Ave. 37°52′18″N 122°15′11″W	Berkeley	1930 building by Arthur Brown, Jr.; demolished 1993
40	Croll Building	Croll Building	October 4, 1982 (#82000960)	1400 Webster St. 37°46′18″N 122°16′36″W	Alameda	
41	Doe Memorial Library	Doe Memorial Library	March 25, 1982 (#82004639)	Oxford St. 37°52′20″N 122°15′34″W	Berkeley	
42	Downtown Oakland Historic District	Downtown Oakland Historic District	July 1, 1998 (#98000813)	Roughly along Broadway from 17th to 11th St. 37°48′17″N 122°16′11″W	Oakland	
43	Drawing Building	Drawing Building	November 18, 1976 (#76000475)	Hearst Ave., University of California campus 37°52′30″N 122°15′27″W	Berkeley	1914 building by John Galen Howard, subsequently known as the Naval Architecture Building, now part of Blum Hall
44	Dunns Block	Dunns Block	November 15, 1978 (#78000652)	725 Washington St. 37°48′02″N 122°16′32″W	Oakland	
45	Dunsmuir House	Dunsmuir House	May 19, 1972 (#72000214)	Peralta Oaks Ct. 37°44′35″N 122°08′47″W	Oakland	
46	Durant Hall	Durant Hall	March 25, 1982 (#82004640)	Oxford St. 37°52′17″N 122°15′36″W	Berkeley	1911 building by John Galen Howard; formerly Boalt Hall of Law
47	Eden Congregational Church	Eden Congregational Church	August 3, 2007 (#07000788)	1046 Grove Way; 37°40′51″N 122°05′37″W	Hayward	
48	George C. Edwards Stadium	George C. Edwards Stadium	April 1, 1993 (#93000263)	Junction of Bancroft Way and Fulton St., UC Berkeley campus 37°52′08″N 122°15′53″W	Berkeley	
49	Elliston	Elliston	June 19, 1985 (#85001327)	463 and 341 Kilkare Rd. 37°36′05″N 121°53′25″W	Sunol	
50	Faculty Club	Faculty Club	March 25, 1982 (#82004641)	Oxford St. 37°52′18″N 122°15′21″W	Berkeley	1902 building by Bernard Maybeck
51	Federal Realty Building	Federal Realty Building	January 2, 1979 (#79000467)	1615 Broadway; 37°48′23″N 122°16′13″W	Oakland	
52	First Church of Christ, Scientist	First Church of Christ, Scientist	December 22, 1977 (#77000283)	2619 Dwight Way; 37°51′56″N 122°15′21″W	Berkeley	1910 building by Bernard Maybeck
53	First Presbyterian Church Sanctuary Building	First Presbyterian Church Sanctuary Building	November 25, 1980 (#80000792)	2001 Santa Clara Ave. 37°46′11″N 122°15′06″W	Alameda	
54	First Unitarian Church	First Unitarian Church	December 10, 1981 (#81000143)	2401 Bancroft Way; 37°52′07″N 122°15′40″W	Berkeley	1898 building by A. C. Schweinfurth; now home to the University of California, Berkeley's Dramatic Arts Department
55	First Unitarian Church of Oakland	First Unitarian Church of Oakland	June 16, 1977 (#77000284)	685 14th St. 37°48′25″N 122°16′31″W	Oakland	
56	Founders' Rock	Founders' Rock	March 25, 1982 (#82004642)	Oxford St. 37°52′31″N 122°15′25″W	Berkeley	Site of dedication of the College of California, April 16, 1860
57	Fox Court	Fox Court	February 4, 1982 (#82002159)	1472–1478 University Ave. 37°52′12″N 122°16′57″W	Berkeley	1930 Tudor Revival building by Carl Fox
58	Fox Oakland Theatre	Fox Oakland Theatre	February 2, 1979 (#79000468)	1807–1829 Telegraph Ave. 37°48′32″N 122°16′09″W	Oakland	
59	Garfield Intermediate School	Garfield Intermediate School	June 14, 1982 (#82002160)	1414 Walnut St. 37°52′54″N 122°16′07″W	Berkeley	1915 building by Ernest Coxhead; also known as Garfield Junior High School; now the Jewish Community Center
60	Giannini Hall	Giannini Hall	March 25, 1982 (#82004643)	Oxford St. 37°52′25″N 122°15′44″W	Berkeley	1930 building by William C. Hays named for Bank of America founder Amadeo Giannini; built to house the Giannini Foundation of Agricultural Economics
61	Girton Hall	Girton Hall	September 26, 1991 (#91001473)	University of California Botanical Garden; 37°52′29″N 122°14′18″W	Berkeley	1911 building by Julia Morgan. Initially known as Senior Women's Hall, now known as Julia Morgan Hall. Moved from UC Berkeley central campus to UC Botanical Garden in 2014.
62	Glory of the Seas Hall		September 25, 2026 (#100013429)	1231 McKay Avenue; 37°46′07″N 122°16′43″W	Berkeley	
63	Golden Sheaf Bakery	Golden Sheaf Bakery	March 31, 1978 (#78000644)	2069–2071 Addison St. 37°52′17″N 122°16′08″W	Berkeley	1905 brick and terra-cotta building by Clinton Day; once part of the Golden Sheaf Bakery, where the first bakers' union was founded in 1904
64	Greek Orthodox Church of the Assumption	Greek Orthodox Church of the Assumption	May 22, 1978 (#78000651)	9th and Castro Sts. 37°48′13″N 122°16′43″W	Oakland	
65	Green Shutter Hotel	Green Shutter Hotel	June 16, 2004 (#04000594)	22650 Main St. 37°40′21″N 122°04′56″W	Hayward	
66	Hagemann Ranch Historic District	Hagemann Ranch Historic District	January 10, 2008 (#07001351)	455 Olivina Ave. 37°40′57″N 121°47′51″W	Livermore	
67	Harrison and Fifteenth Sts. Historic District	Harrison and Fifteenth Sts. Historic District	November 7, 1996 (#96001277)	1401–1501 Harrison St., 300–312 14th St., 300–349 15th St. 37°48′14″N 122°15′59″W	Oakland	
68	Weston Havens House	Weston Havens House	June 11, 2008 (#05000597)	255 Panoramic Way; 37°52′09″N 122°14′50″W	Berkeley	1941 house by Harwell Hamilton Harris bequeathed to the University of California by the last direct descendant of Berkeley founder, Francis Kittredge Shattuck
69	Haviland Hall	Haviland Hall	February 1, 1982 (#82002161)	University of California Campus; 37°52′25″N 122°15′40″W	Berkeley	1924 building by John Galen Howard
70	Hearst Greek Theatre	Hearst Greek Theatre	March 25, 1982 (#82004644)	Oxford St. 37°52′25″N 122°15′15″W	Berkeley	1903 outdoor theater by John Galen Howard named for donor and publisher William Randolph Hearst
71	Hearst Gymnasium for Women	Hearst Gymnasium for Women	March 25, 1982 (#82004645)	Oxford St. 37°52′10″N 122°15′24″W	Berkeley	1927 building by Bernard Maybeck and Julia Morgan named in honor of William Randolph Hearst's mother Phoebe Apperson Hearst
72	Hearst Memorial Mining Building	Hearst Memorial Mining Building	March 25, 1982 (#82004646)	Oxford St. 37°52′27″N 122°15′26″W	Berkeley	1902–1907 building by John Galen Howard, named for Senator George Hearst
73	Heathcote-MacKenzie House	Heathcote-MacKenzie House	October 29, 1991 (#91001538)	4501 Pleasanton Ave. 37°39′37″N 121°53′06″W	Pleasanton	
74	Heinold's First and Last Chance Saloon	Heinold's First and Last Chance Saloon	September 1, 2000 (#00001067)	56 Jack London Square; 37°47′38″N 122°16′23″W	Oakland	
75	Hilgard Hall	Hilgard Hall	March 25, 1982 (#82004647)	Oxford St. 37°52′24″N 122°15′48″W	Berkeley	1917 building by John Galen Howard; named for Eugene W. Hilgard, renowned pedologist and first dean of the University of California College of Agriculture
76	Hillside School	Hillside School	October 29, 1982 (#82000961)	1581 Leroy Ave. 37°52′51″N 122°15′32″W	Berkeley	1925 school by Walter H. Ratcliff, Jr.
77	Hotel Menlo	Hotel Menlo	December 29, 2020 (#100005984)	344 13th St. 37°48′10″N 122°16′08″W	Oakland	
78	Immanuel Evangelical Lutheran Church of Alameda	Immanuel Evangelical Lutheran Church of Alameda	September 21, 2023 (#100009369)	1420 Lafayette St. 37°46′10″N 122°15′11″W	Alameda	
79	Kahn's Department Store	Kahn's Department Store	March 30, 1989 (#89000194)	1501–39 Broadway; 37°48′21″N 122°16′15″W	Oakland	
80	John W. Kottinger Adobe Barn	John W. Kottinger Adobe Barn	September 12, 1985 (#85002305)	200 Ray St. 37°39′48″N 121°52′21″W	Pleasanton	Formerly used as a jail by John W. Kottinger, a justice of peace in Murray Township. Now occupied by an antique shop.
81	Ladies' Relief Society Children's Home	Ladies' Relief Society Children's Home	July 13, 2006 (#06000612)	365 45th St. 37°49′58″N 122°15′26″W	Oakland	
82	Lake Merritt Wild Duck Refuge	Lake Merritt Wild Duck Refuge	October 15, 1966 (#66000205)	Lakeside Park, Grand Ave. 37°48′23″N 122°15′18″W	Oakland	Established March 18, 1870; first official wildlife refuge in the United States
83	LeConte Hall	LeConte Hall	June 25, 2004 (#04000622)	Hearst and Gayley; 37°52′21″N 122°15′24″W	Berkeley	
84	Liberty Hall	Liberty Hall	March 30, 1989 (#89000199)	1483–1485 8th St. 37°48′23″N 122°17′44″W	Oakland	Built in 1877; meeting hall of the Oakland chapter of the Universal Negro Improvement Association
85	Lightship WAL-605, RELIEF	Lightship WAL-605, RELIEF	December 20, 1989 (#89002462)	Oakland Estuary in Brooklyn Basin; 37°47′44″N 122°16′50″W	Oakland	
86	Livermore Carnegie Library and Park	Livermore Carnegie Library and Park	December 3, 2011 (#11000876)	2155 3rd St. 37°40′47″N 121°46′07″W	Livermore	
87	Livermore Veterans Administration Hospital, Building 62		April 23, 2020 (#100005208)	4951 Arroyo Rd., Livermore Division Campus; 37°37′32″N 121°45′47″W	Livermore	
88	Locke House	Locke House	April 7, 1989 (#89000258)	3911 Harrison St. 37°49′19″N 122°15′01″W	Oakland	
89	Loring House	Loring House	July 13, 1989 (#89000857)	1730 Spruce St. 37°52′35″N 122°15′56″W	Berkeley	
90	Madison Park Apartments	Madison Park Apartments	April 1, 1982 (#82002164)	100 9th St. 37°47′53″N 122°15′55″W	Oakland	
91	Main Post Office and Federal Building	Main Post Office and Federal Building	October 23, 1980 (#80000796)	201 13th St. 37°48′05″N 122°15′59″W	Oakland	
92	Masonic Temple	Masonic Temple	July 15, 1982 (#82002162)	2105 Bancroft Way and 2295 Shattuck Ave. 37°52′04″N 122°16′03″W	Berkeley	
93	Masonic Temple and Lodge	Masonic Temple and Lodge	March 25, 1982 (#82002153)	1329–31 Park St. and 2312 Alameda Ave. 37°45′48″N 122°14′38″W	Alameda	
94	McCrea House	McCrea House	February 11, 1982 (#82002165)	3500 Mountain Blvd. 37°48′03″N 122°11′12″W	Oakland	
95	Meek Mansion and Carriage House	Meek Mansion and Carriage House	June 4, 1973 (#73000393)	240 Hampton Rd. 37°41′04″N 122°06′48″W	Hayward	
96	Melrose Baptist Church	Melrose Baptist Church	March 27, 2017 (#100000778)	1638 47th Ave. 37°46′20″N 122°12′34″W	Oakland	
97	Mills Hall	Mills Hall	October 14, 1971 (#71000132)	Mills College campus 37°46′47″N 122°10′56″W	Oakland	
98	Mission San José	Mission San José	July 14, 1971 (#71000131)	Mission Blvd. at Washington Blvd. 37°32′00″N 121°55′11″W	Fremont	
99	Montgomery Ward & Company	Montgomery Ward & Company	June 15, 1999 (#99000691)	2825 E. 14th St. 37°46′47″N 122°13′48″W	Oakland	Demolished in 2001
100	D. J. Murphy House	D. J. Murphy House	April 6, 1978 (#78000649)	291 McLeod St. 37°40′54″N 121°45′58″W	Livermore	
101	Naval Air Station Alameda Historic District	Naval Air Station Alameda Historic District	January 23, 2013 (#12001191)	NAS Alameda; 37°47′10″N 122°18′09″W	Alameda	
102	Niles Canyon Transcontinental Railroad Historic District	Niles Canyon Transcontinental Railroad Historic District	October 13, 2010 (#10000843)	Railway corridor from Niles to Pleasanton; 37°35′40″N 121°53′19″W	Fremont, Pleasanton, and Sunol	
103	North Gate Hall	North Gate Hall	March 25, 1982 (#82004648)	Oxford St. 37°52′30″N 122°15′35″W	Berkeley	
104	Oakland Auditorium	Oakland Auditorium	February 1, 2021 (#100006085)	10 10th St. 37°47′51″N 122°15′42″W	Oakland	Now the Kaiser Convention Center
105	Oakland City Hall	Oakland City Hall	September 15, 1983 (#83001170)	1 Frank H. Ogawa Plaza; 37°48′19″N 122°16′21″W	Oakland	
106	Oakland Free Library-23rd Avenue Branch	Oakland Free Library-23rd Avenue Branch	February 16, 1996 (#96000106)	1449 Miller Ave., 2347 E. 15th St. 37°47′01″N 122°14′04″W	Oakland	Demolished in 2018
107	Oakland Free Library-Alden Branch	Oakland Free Library-Alden Branch	February 16, 1996 (#96000105)	5205 Telegraph Ave., 500 52nd St. 37°50′18″N 122°15′45″W	Oakland	Now the Temescal Branch.
108	Oakland Free Library-Golden Gate Branch	Oakland Free Library-Golden Gate Branch	February 16, 1996 (#96000103)	5606 San Pablo Ave., 1098 56th St. 37°50′21″N 122°16′56″W	Oakland	
109	Oakland Free Library-Melrose Branch	Oakland Free Library-Melrose Branch	February 16, 1996 (#96000104)	4805 Foothill Blvd., 1738 48th Ave. 37°46′21″N 122°12′27″W	Oakland	
110	Oakland Hotel	Oakland Hotel	September 4, 1979 (#79000470)	260 13th St. 37°48′09″N 122°16′02″W	Oakland	
111	Oakland Iron Works-United Works, and the Remillard Brick Company	Oakland Iron Works-United Works, and the Remillard Brick Company	August 25, 1983 (#83001171)	552–592 2nd St. 37°47′50″N 122°16′44″W	Oakland	
112	Oakland Lamp Works	Oakland Lamp Works	March 24, 2015 (#15000098)	1614 Campbell St. 37°48′49″N 122°17′37″W	Oakland	
113	Oakland Public Library	Oakland Public Library	August 11, 1983 (#83001173)	659 14th St. 37°48′22″N 122°16′35″W	Oakland	Now the African American Museum and Library.
114	Oakland Waterfront Warehouse District	Oakland Waterfront Warehouse District	April 24, 2000 (#00000361)	Roughly bounded by I-880, Madison St., 2nd St., and Webster St. 37°47′43″N 122°16′16″W	Oakland	
115	Oakland YWCA Building	Oakland YWCA Building	September 20, 1984 (#84000755)	1515 Webster St. 37°48′17″N 122°16′06″W	Oakland	Now Common Webster and the Envision Academy of Arts & Technology
116	Donald and Helen Olsen House	Donald and Helen Olsen House	October 1, 2010 (#10000812)	771 San Diego Rd. 37°53′46″N 122°16′21″W	Berkeley	
117	Pacific Gas & Electric Company Building	Pacific Gas & Electric Company Building	July 17, 1986 (#86001665)	1625 Clay and 551 17th Sts. 37°48′26″N 122°16′22″W	Oakland	
118	Pacific Press Building		April 14, 1975 (#75000421)	1117 Castro St. 37°48′17″N 122°16′42″W	Oakland	demolished
119	Panoramic Hill	Panoramic Hill	October 21, 2005 (#05000424)	Panoramic Wy, Canyon Rd., Mosswood, Orchard Ln., Arden Rd. 37°52′07″N 122°14′13″W	Berkeley	
120	Paramount Theatre	Paramount Theatre	August 14, 1973 (#73000395)	2025 Broadway; 37°48′35″N 122°16′05″W	Oakland	
121	Pardee House	Pardee House	May 24, 1976 (#76000476)	672 11th St. 37°48′17″N 122°16′40″W	Oakland	
122	Park Street Historic Commercial District	Park Street Historic Commercial District	May 12, 1982 (#82002154)	Roughly bounded by Oak St., Park, Lincoln, and Encinal Aves. 37°45′53″N 122°14′36″W	Alameda	
123	George Washington Patterson Ranch-Ardenwood	George Washington Patterson Ranch-Ardenwood	November 29, 1985 (#85003043)	34600 Newark Blvd. 37°33′27″N 122°02′57″W	Fremont	
124	People's Park	People's Park	May 24, 2022 (#100007288)	Between Haste St., Dwight Way, Telegraph Ave., and Bowditch St. 37°51′56″N 122°15′25″W	Berkeley	
125	Peralta House	Peralta House	November 22, 1978 (#78000654)	561 Lafayette Ave. 37°43′50″N 122°09′42″W	San Leandro	
126	Antonio Maria Peralta House	Antonio Maria Peralta House	November 17, 1977 (#77000285)	2465 34th Ave. 37°47′14″N 122°13′03″W	Oakland	
127	Peterson House	Peterson House	March 11, 1982 (#82002155)	1124 Talbot Ave. 37°53′01″N 122°17′36″W	Albany	
128	Phi Delta Theta Chapter House	Phi Delta Theta Chapter House	January 11, 1983 (#83001172)	2717 Hearst Ave. 37°52′33″N 122°15′22″W	Berkeley	
129	Ravenswood	Ravenswood	June 26, 1979 (#79000466)	South of Livermore on Arroyo Rd. 37°39′08″N 121°46′11″W	Livermore	
130	Remar Bakery	Remar Bakery	April 11, 2002 (#02000328)	1010 46th St. 37°50′09″N 122°16′33″W	Emeryville	Now known as Bakery Lofts.
131	Room 307, Gilman Hall, University of California	Room 307, Gilman Hall, University of California	October 15, 1966 (#66000203)	University of California at Berkeley campus 37°52′21″N 122°15′23″W	Berkeley	
132	St. Joseph's Home for the Aged	St. Joseph's Home for the Aged	December 20, 2016 (#16000864)	2647 International Blvd. 37°46′51″N 122°13′55″W	Oakland	
133	Sather Gate and Bridge	Sather Gate and Bridge	March 25, 1982 (#82004649)	U.C.Berkeley; 37°52′13″N 122°15′34″W	Berkeley	
134	Sather Tower	Sather Tower	March 25, 1982 (#82004650)	Oxford St. 37°52′19″N 122°15′28″W	Berkeley	
135	Security Bank and Trust Company Building	Security Bank and Trust Company Building	July 26, 1982 (#82002166)	1000 Broadway; 37°48′08″N 122°16′19″W	Oakland	Also headquarters of Key System
136	Senior Hall	Senior Hall	November 5, 1974 (#74000506)	University of California, Berkeley campus 37°52′19″N 122°15′19″W	Berkeley	1906 log cabin by John Galen Howard; also known as Senior Men's Hall and Golden Bear Lodge
137	Shinn Ranch Farmstead		April 16, 2026 (#100012913)	1269 Peralta Boulevard; 37°33′54″N 121°58′50″W	Fremont	
138	South Berkeley Community Church	South Berkeley Community Church	November 15, 2007 (#07001176)	1802 Fairview St. 37°51′01″N 122°16′21″W	Berkeley	
139	South Hall	South Hall	March 25, 1982 (#82004651)	Oxford St. 37°52′17″N 122°15′31″W	Berkeley	
140	St. John's Presbyterian Church	St. John's Presbyterian Church	August 7, 1974 (#74000507)	2640 College Ave. 37°51′43″N 122°15′13″W	Berkeley	Now known as the Julia Morgan Center
141	St. Joseph's Basilica	St. Joseph's Basilica	September 18, 1978 (#78000642)	1109 Chestnut St. 37°45′58″N 122°15′17″W	Alameda	
142	St. Raymond's Church	St. Raymond's Church	April 12, 2006 (#06000242)	6600 Donlon Way; 37°42′00″N 121°56′16″W	Dublin	
143	Southern Pacific 16th Street Station and 16th Street Tower	Southern Pacific 16th Street Station and 16th Street Tower	January 21, 2025 (#100011288)	1798 16th Street,1601 Wood Street and 1709 Wood Street (1405 Wood Street); 37°48′54″N 122°17′48″W	Oakland	
144	State Asylum for the Deaf, Dumb and Blind	State Asylum for the Deaf, Dumb and Blind	October 14, 1982 (#82000962)	Bounded by Dwight Way, City line, Derby and Warring Sts. 37°51′50″N 122°14′53″W	Berkeley	Now Clark Kerr Campus
145	Studio Building	Studio Building	April 6, 1978 (#78000645)	2045 Shattuck Ave. 37°52′18″N 122°16′03″W	Berkeley	
146	William R. Thorsen House	William R. Thorsen House	November 20, 1978 (#78000646)	2307 Piedmont Ave. 37°52′08″N 122°15′06″W	Berkeley	
147	Toverii Tuppa	Toverii Tuppa	July 12, 1978 (#78000647)	1819 10th St. 37°52′15″N 122°17′37″W	Berkeley	
148	Treadwell Mansion and Carriage House	Treadwell Mansion and Carriage House	July 15, 1977 (#77000286)	5212 Broadway; 37°50′08″N 122°15′02″W	Oakland	Formerly part of the California College of the Arts from 1922 until 2022; in 2017 CCA sold this property to a housing developer who intends to build between 400-600 apartments
149	Trinity Church	Trinity Church	February 4, 1982 (#82002167)	525 29th St. 37°49′06″N 122°16′05″W	Oakland	
150	Tupper and Reed Building	Tupper and Reed Building	January 21, 1982 (#82002163)	2275 Shattuck Ave. 37°52′05″N 122°16′03″W	Berkeley	Now known as Beckett's Pub
151	U.S. Post Office	U.S. Post Office	January 29, 1981 (#81000144)	2000 Allston Way; 37°52′08″N 122°16′13″W	Berkeley	
152	Union Iron Works Powerhouse	Union Iron Works Powerhouse	January 10, 1980 (#80000793)	2308 Webster St. 37°47′12″N 122°16′27″W	Alameda	
153	Union Iron Works Turbine Machine Shop	Union Iron Works Turbine Machine Shop	April 10, 1980 (#80000794)	2200 Webster St. 37°47′04″N 122°16′19″W	Alameda	
154	University Art Museum	University Art Museum	January 8, 2014 (#13001034)	2626 Bancroft Way; 37°52′08″N 122°15′21″W	Berkeley	
155	University High School	University High School	October 2, 1992 (#92001300)	5714 Martin Luther King Jr. Way; 37°50′33″N 122°16′10″W	Oakland	Now the North Oakland Senior Center and the Children's Hospital Oakland Research Institute
156	University House	University House	March 25, 1982 (#82004652)	Oxford St. 37°52′28″N 122°15′44″W	Berkeley	
157	USS HORNET	USS HORNET	December 4, 1991 (#91002065)	Alameda Point; 37°46′22″N 122°18′10″W	Alameda	Listed in the National Park Service NRIS database in Bremerton, Washington; moved to Naval Air Station Alameda and opened as a museum in 1998.
158	USS POTOMAC (yacht)	USS POTOMAC (yacht)	February 20, 1987 (#87000068)	1660 Embarcadero; 37°47′43″N 122°16′48″W	Oakland	
159	Washington Union High School	Washington Union High School	October 5, 1981 (#81000145)	38442 Fremont Blvd. 37°33′10″N 121°59′41″W	Fremont	
160	Wellman Hall	Wellman Hall	March 25, 1982 (#82004653)	Oxford St. 37°52′23″N 122°15′46″W	Berkeley	
161	Wetmore House	Wetmore House	April 14, 1978 (#78000653)	342 Bonita Ave. 37°49′27″N 122°13′59″W	Piedmont	
162	Wheeler Hall	Wheeler Hall	March 25, 1982 (#82004654)	Oxford St. 37°52′16″N 122°15′32″W	Berkeley	
163	White Mansion	White Mansion	October 31, 1980 (#80000797)	604 E. 17th St. 37°47′49″N 122°15′00″W	Oakland	
164	Women's Athletic Club of Alameda County	Women's Athletic Club of Alameda County	April 29, 2009 (#09000247)	525 Bellevue Ave. 37°48′28″N 122°15′16″W	Oakland	

== Former listing ==
	Name on the Register	Image	Date listed	Date removed	Location	City or town	Description
1	Byrne House		February 17, 1978 (#78000643)	November 11, 1990	1301 Oxford St.	Berkeley	Destroyed by fire in 1984. Also known as the Napoleon Bonaparte Byrne House & Grounds

== See also ==
- List of National Historic Landmarks in California
- National Register of Historic Places listings in California
- California Historical Landmarks in Alameda County, California
- List of Berkeley Landmarks in Berkeley, California
- List of Oakland Designated Landmarks
