= Chamber of Commerce Building (Berkeley, California) =

Historic place in Berkeley, California

- U.S. National Register of Historic Places
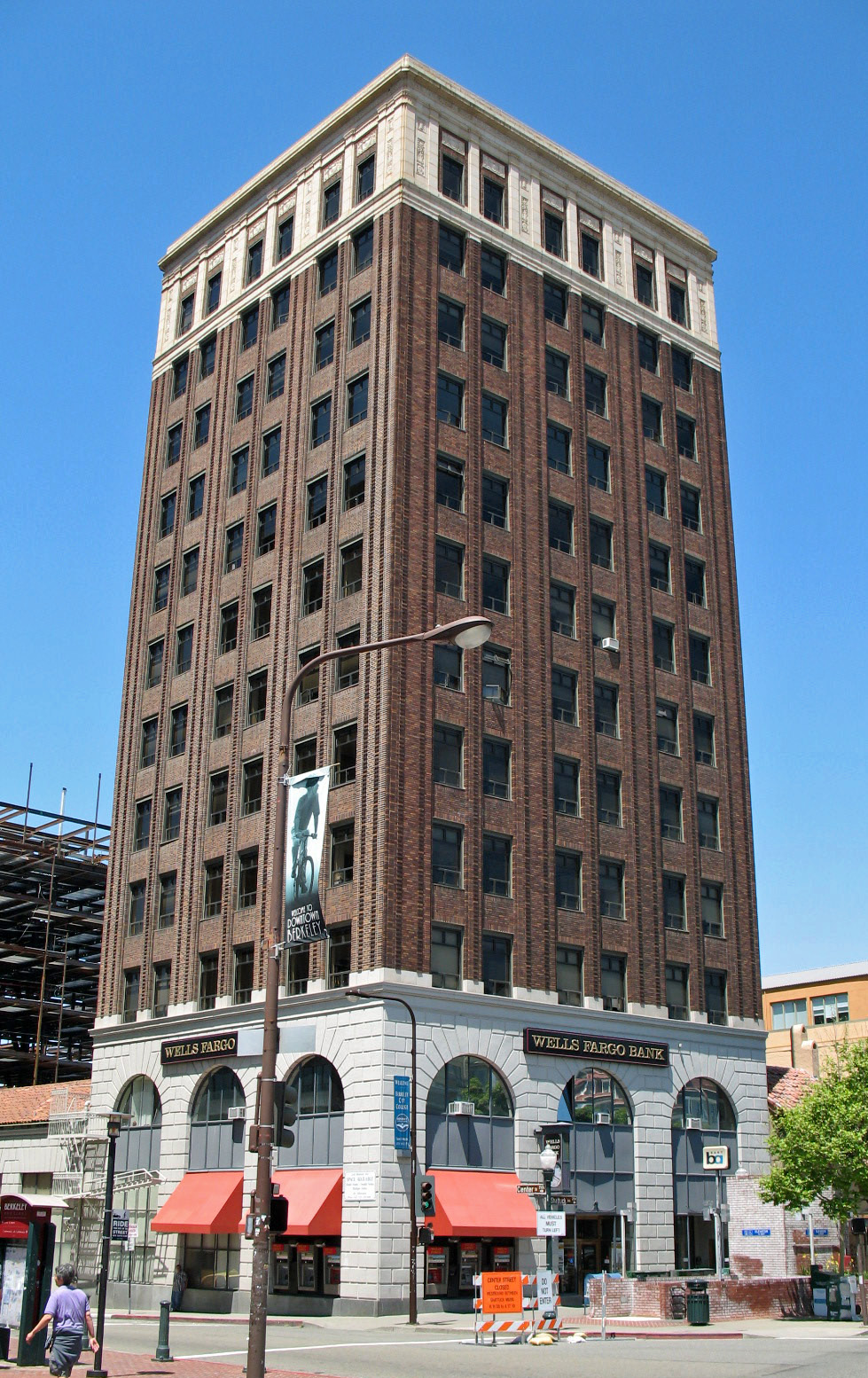
- Chamber of Commerce Building

- Location within Oakland, California Location within California Location within the United States
- Location: 22140–2144 Shattuck Ave. & 2071–2089 Center St, Berkeley, California
- Coordinates: 37.870508°N 122.268872°W
- Built: 1925; 101 years ago
- Architect: James W. Plachek
- NRHP reference No.: 85001916
- Added to NRHP: August 29, 1985

Chamber of Commerce Building is a historical building in downtown Berkeley, California. The Chamber of Commerce Building was built in 1925. The building was listed on the National Register of Historic Places on August 29, 1985. The twelve-story Chamber of Commerce Building was the first highrise building in Berkeley. The building was designed by Walter H. Ratcliff Jr. for the Central Berkeley Building Company. The Berkeley Chamber of Commerce headquarters was on the top floor from 1925 to 1938. The Chamber of Commerce moved across the street to 100 Berkeley Square in 1838. In 1905, the Berkeley Chamber of Commerce was founded. In 1927, on the ground floor the American Trust Bank Berkeley Branch opened. In 1938, the building's name changed to the American Trust Building. The famous Stanford Axe award, was stored in American Trust vault and was stolen by the University of California on its way to the Greek Theater in an armored car on April 3, 1930. Later Wells Fargo Bank moved in and the building became the Wells Fargo Building. The building was listed as a City of Berkeley Landmark on December 17, 1984.

James W. Plachek designed a number of other buildings in Berkeley, including: Berkeley Public Library, Corder Building, New Hotel Carquinez, UC Theatre, schools, and civic buildings. Architect James W. Plachek office was the Heywood Building.

== Gallery ==
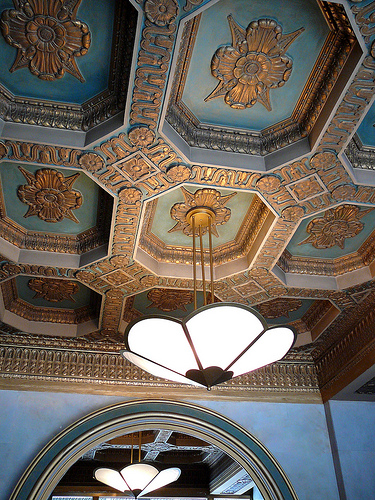

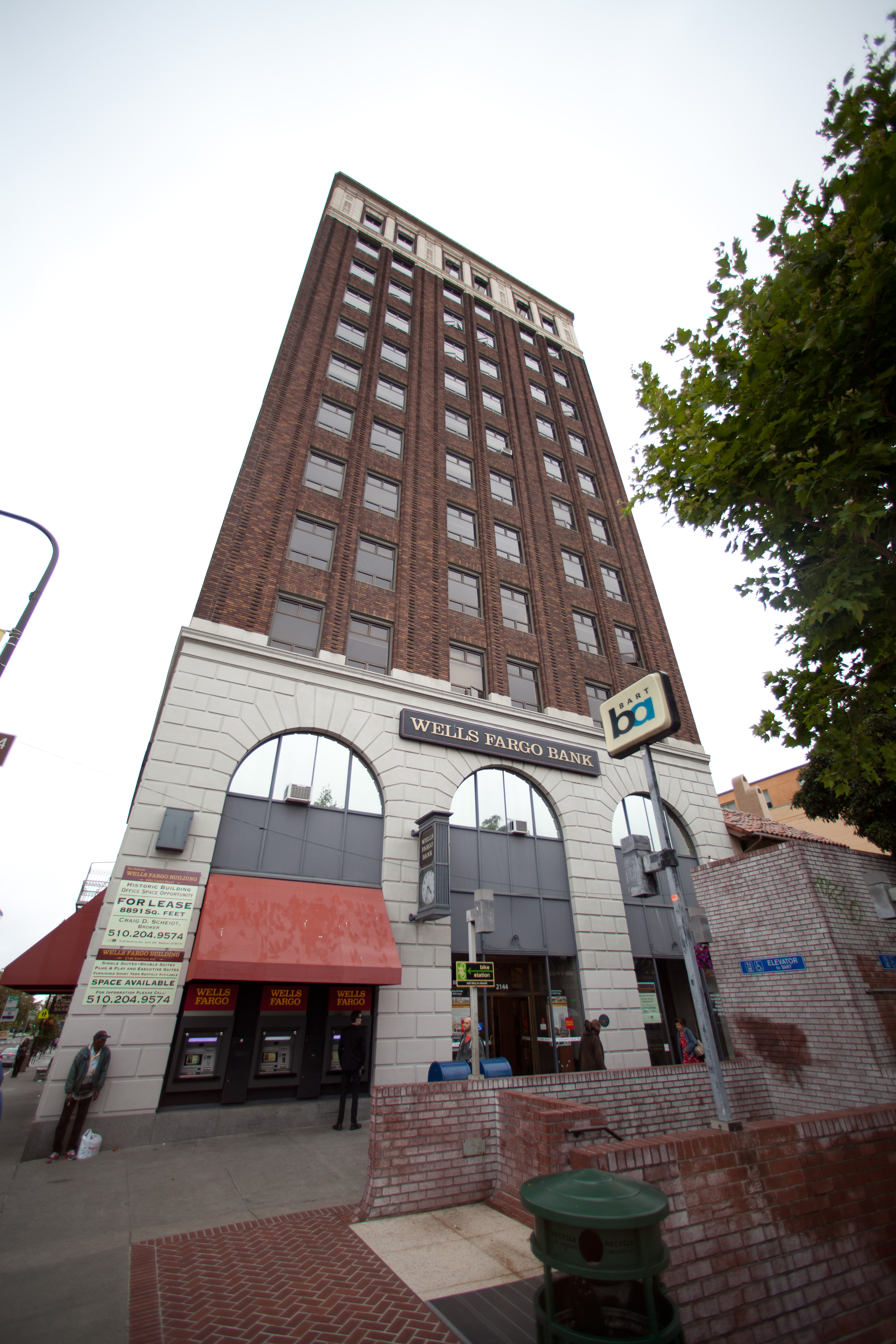

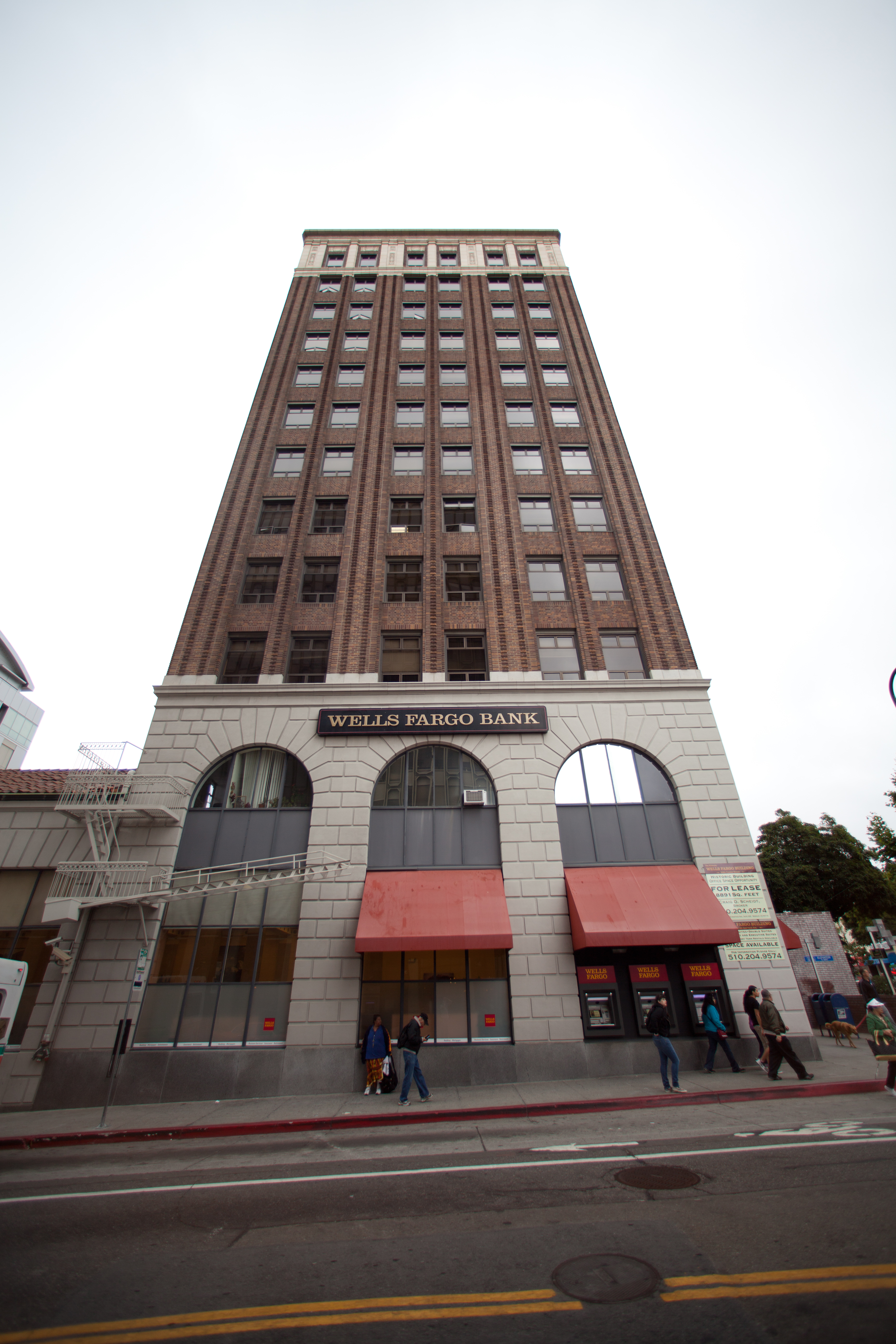

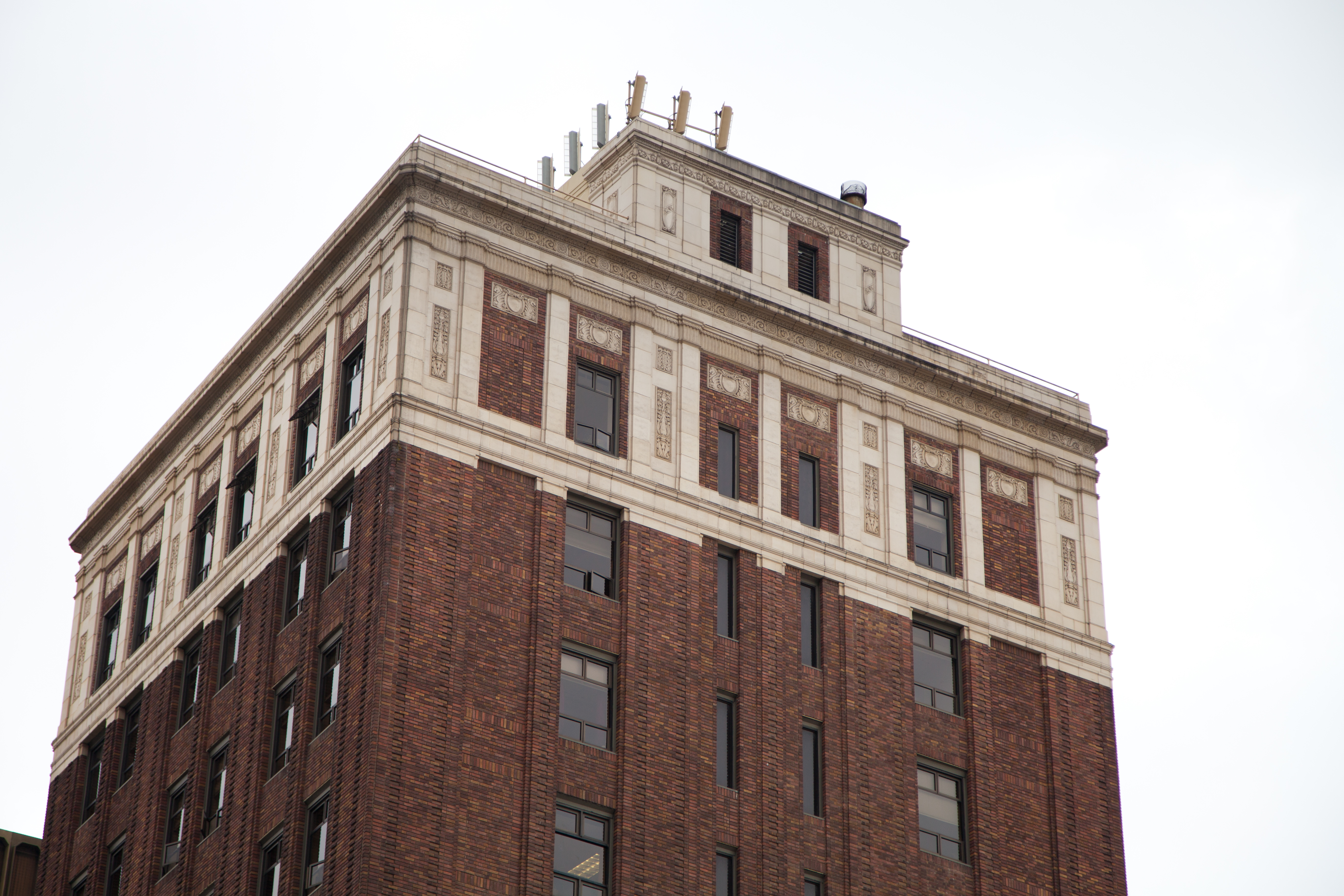

== See also ==
- National Register of Historic Places listings in Alameda County, California
- List of Berkeley Landmarks in Berkeley, California
