= Kahn's Department Store =

Historic place in Oakland, California

- Kahn's Department Store; The Rotunda Building
- U.S. National Register of Historic Places
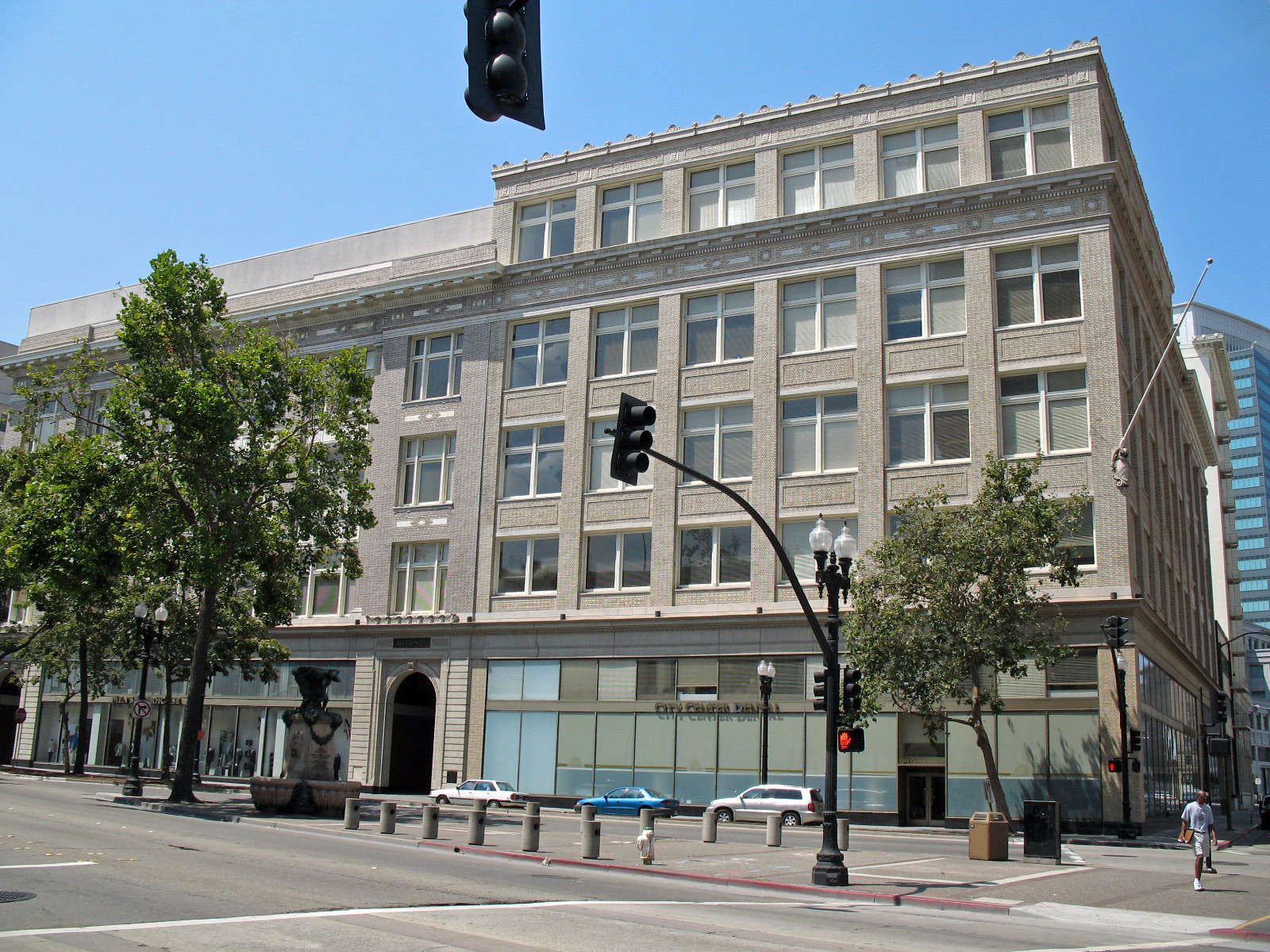
- Kahn's Department Store

- Location within Oakland, California Location within California Location within the United States
- Location: 21501–39 Broadway. Oakland, California
- Coordinates: 37.805833°N 122.270833°W
- Built: 1912; 114 years ago
- Architect: Charles W. Dickey
- Architectural style: Beaux-Arts architecture
- NRHP reference No.: 89000194
- Added to NRHP: March 30, 1989

Kahn's Department Store, also called The Rotunda Building, is a historical seven story Beaux-Arts architecture building in downtown Oakland, California. The Kahn's Department Store was built in 1912. The building was listed on the National Register of Historic Places on March 30, 1989. Some of the noted features of the building are the 120-foot-high elliptical dome, with a 5,000 sq. foot floor below, a grand staircase, columns and terrazzo floors. The 167,000 square feet Kahn's Department Store was designed by Charles W. Dickey for Israel Kahn (1822–1883). Israel Kahn came from Germany to New York City and then to San Francisco in 1877. The original Kahn's Department Store was at 12th and Washington. Israel Kahn founded the Kahn's Department Store in 1879. The store was successful and in 1923 the building was expanded on the northeast corner, to 385,000 Sq. feet. In 1949 two partial levels were also added. The name of the store change in 1960 to the Rhodes Department Store and in 1975 changed again to the Liberty House store. Liberty House store closed in 1983 and remained vacant. The 1989 Loma Prieta earthquake did major damage to the building. The building was sold in 1991 to the Oakland Redevelopment Agency, with plans to restore and update the building and some adjacent buildings. The Oakland Redevelopment Agency and Rotunda Partners II, LLC partnered for the restoration in 1998, with Rotunda Partners buying the building in 1999. After a three-year renovation at a cost of about $50 million, the building reopened as The Rotunda Building office building. Kahn's Department Store is also an Oakland Landmark #132 listed on April 9, 2002.

== See also ==
- National Register of Historic Places listings in Alameda County, California
