= Alameda County Building and Loan Association Building =

Historic place in Oakland, California

- Alameda County Building and Loan Association Building; Hotel Wagner; Wagner Apartments
- U.S. National Register of Historic Places
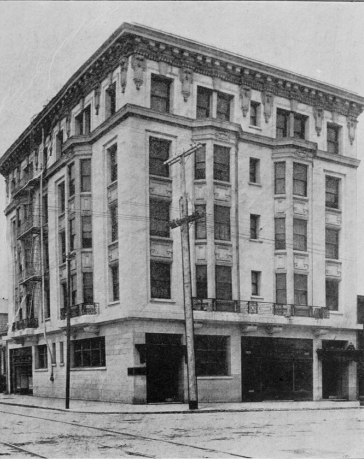
- Alameda County Building and Loan Association Building in 1911

- Location within Oakland, California Location within California Location within the United States
- Location: 1601-1605 Clay St., Oakland, California
- Coordinates: 37.806770°N 122.272826°W
- Built: 1907; 119 years ago
- Architects: Harry Cunningham and Matthew Politeo
- Architectural style: Beaux-Arts and Art Nouveau
- NRHP reference No.: 16000152
- Added to NRHP: April 12, 2016

Alameda County Building and Loan Association Building, also known as Hotel Wagner; Academy of Chinese Culture and Health Science building, the Wagner Apartments is a historical building in Oakland, California. The 1601-1605 Clay Street building was built in 1907. The building was listed to the National Register of Historic Places on April 12, 2016. Alameda County Building and Loan Association Building was designed by Harry Cunningham and Matthew Politeo with a steel-framed, clad in stucco and brick. The Alameda County Building and Loan Association Building is a five-story-over-basement. The architecture is mix of Beaux-Arts and Art Nouveau in the Oakland financial district. Alameda County Building and Loan Association Building on a rectangular corner lot. The building was built just after the 1906 San Francisco earthquake.

Alameda County Building and Loan Association Building was sold to L.H. Wagner in 1926. Wagner opened the Hotel Wagner with commercial spaces on the ground flour. In 1952 the building was sold to H.G. Getz, who keep the Hotel Wagner name. In 1984 the building was sold to Dr. Wei Tsuei, educator of traditional Chinese medicine. Tsuei opened the non-profit Taoist Center in Oakland and the Academy of Chinese Culture and Health Science in the former Hotel Wagner. In 1987, Tsuei converted the former Hotel Wagner into apartments, with some rooms still used for Chinese medicine Academy. In 2014 the Chinese medicine Academy closed and the building is only an apartments now.

== See also ==
- National Register of Historic Places listings in Alameda County, California
