= Harrison and Fifteenth Streets Historic District =

Historic place in Oakland, California

- U.S. National Register of Historic Places
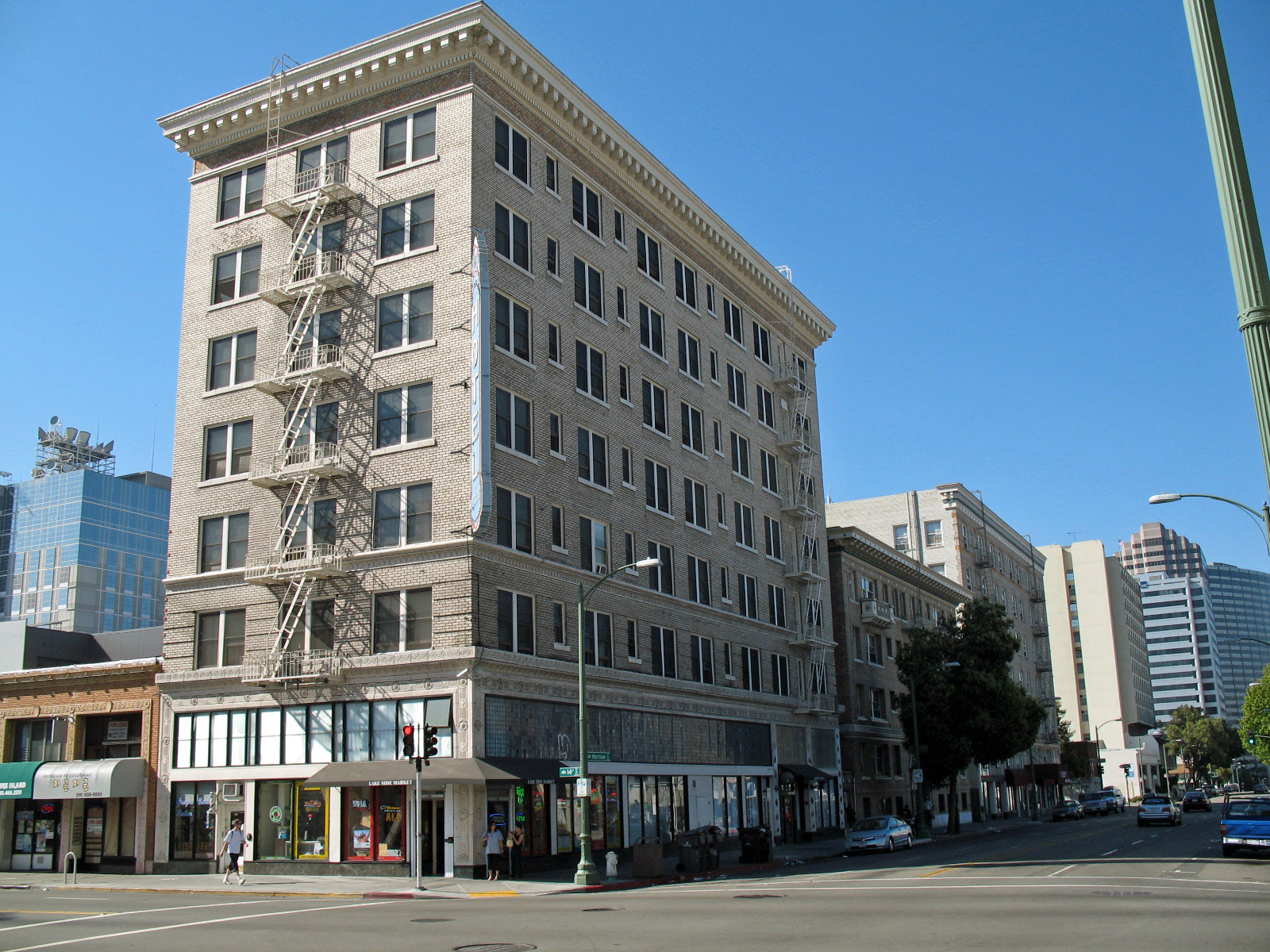
- Hotel Harrison in the Harrison and Fifteenth Sts. Historic District

- Location within Oakland, California Location within California Location within the United States
- Location: Oakland, California, United States
- Coordinates: 37.803889°N 122.266389°W
- Built: 1914 to 1929
- Architectural style: Late 19th and 20th century Revival architecture
- NRHP reference No.: 96001277
- Added to NRHP: November 7, 1996

Harrison and Fifteenth Streets Historic District is a group of seven historical buildings in downtown Oakland, California, United States. The Harrison and Fifteenth Street Historic District buildings were built between 1914 and 1929. The buildings were listed on the National Register of Historic Places on November 7, 1996. The Harrison and Fifteenth Streets Historic District covers: 1401–1501 Harrison Street, 300–312 14th Street, and 300–349 15th Street.

The Harrison and Fifteenth Streets Historic District includes the Mrs. A.E. White Building at 327-349 15th Street, that was also designated an Oakland Landmark (LM-85-319) in 1985. The Mrs. A.E. White three-story building is a Tudor building designed by architect Clay N. Burrell. The White Building has 150 feet (46 m) of store frontage along 15th Street, but this building is only 20.25 feet (6.17 m) deep into the lot. Most of the buildings were built in the late 19th and 20th century Revival architecture.

== Harrison and Fifteenth Streets Historic District ==
Harrison and Fifteenth Streets Historic District includes:

- Hotel Harrison, built in 1914, architects Olver and Thomas, 81 units, 7 story, brick
- Harrison Apartments, built in 1924, architect Leonard H. Ford, Oak Grove 1425 Harrison Street, 4 story
- Hotel Coit, built in 1924, architect Leonard H. Ford, for Coit Investment Company, 6 story, brick, terracotta trim, Renaissance Revival, now Davis-Coit Apartments
- Dille Building, built 1921, architects Reed and Corletty, 2 story, Renaissance Revival with terracotta trim, first owner Mrs. Helen M. Dille
- Coit Commercial, built in 1914, architects Olver and Thomas, for Coit Investment Company, 2 story Art Deco - Renaissance Revival
- The White Building, built by R. W. Littlefield in 1924, 3 story, Tudor Revival
- Thompson Building, built in 1929, architect Hugh C. White, 2 story, Mediterranean Revival

== Hotel Harrison ==
Hotel Harrison opened in 1914, with Roger Coit operation the hotel. It was built by F. A. Mueller. In the early 1920s, The Oakland Business and Professional Women's Club held their meetings at the hotel. The club built their own building in 1926. The World War I and later joining World War II veterans with the American Legion held their meetings at Hotel Harrison for many years. Half of the hotel's interest was sold to Mrs. Byrne Kelly in 1929. Mrs. Byrne Kelly became manager of the hotel and installed the current large neon sign. In 1933, Hotel Harrison was remodeled, and the new manager was Mr. Claire Bottenfield. The remodeling was done by its new owner William Frisbie Lewis Company, with Irving C. Lewis as president of the company. Operating on the ground floor was The Red Lion Tavern, a tavern and coffee shop.

== Hotel Harrison gallery ==
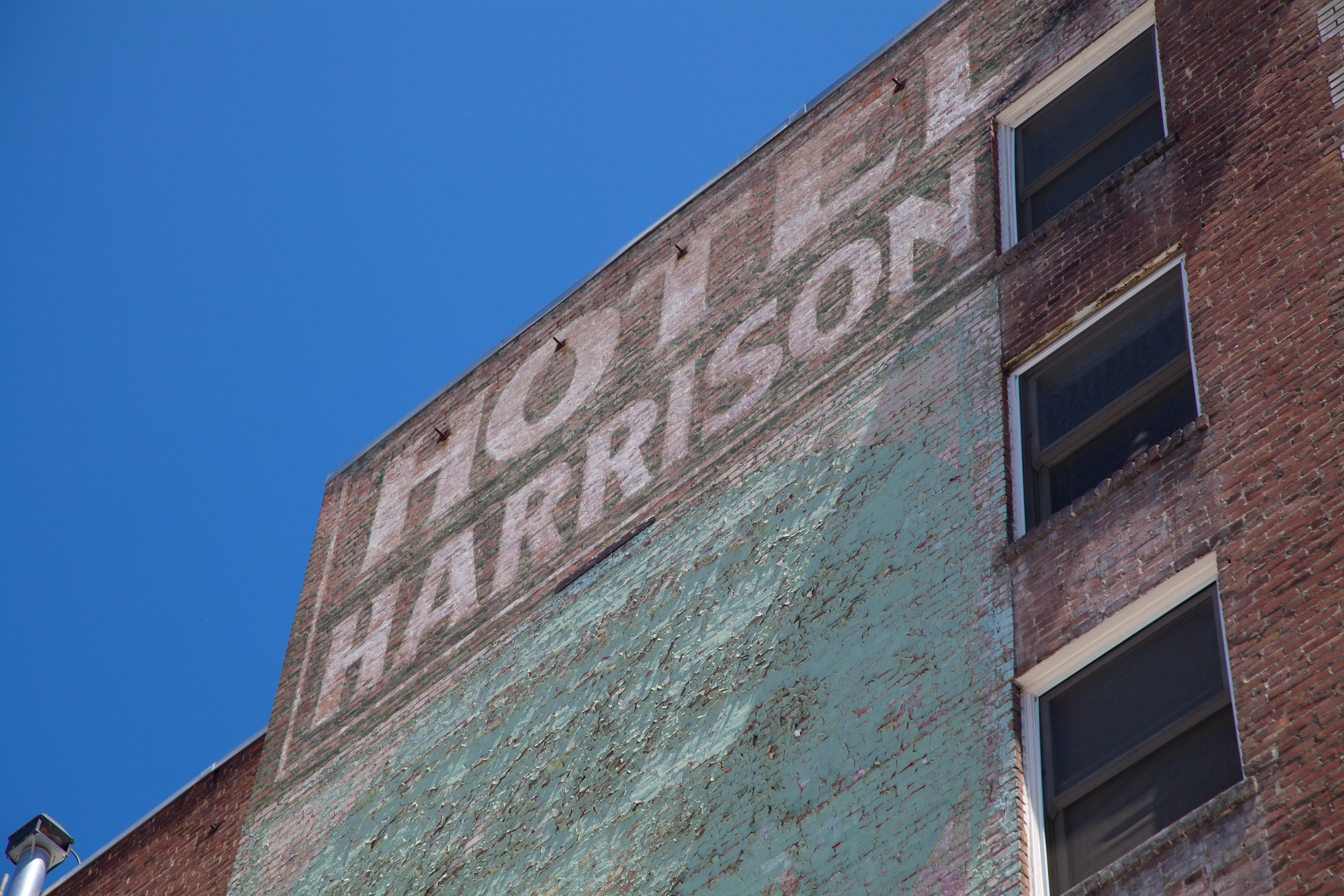

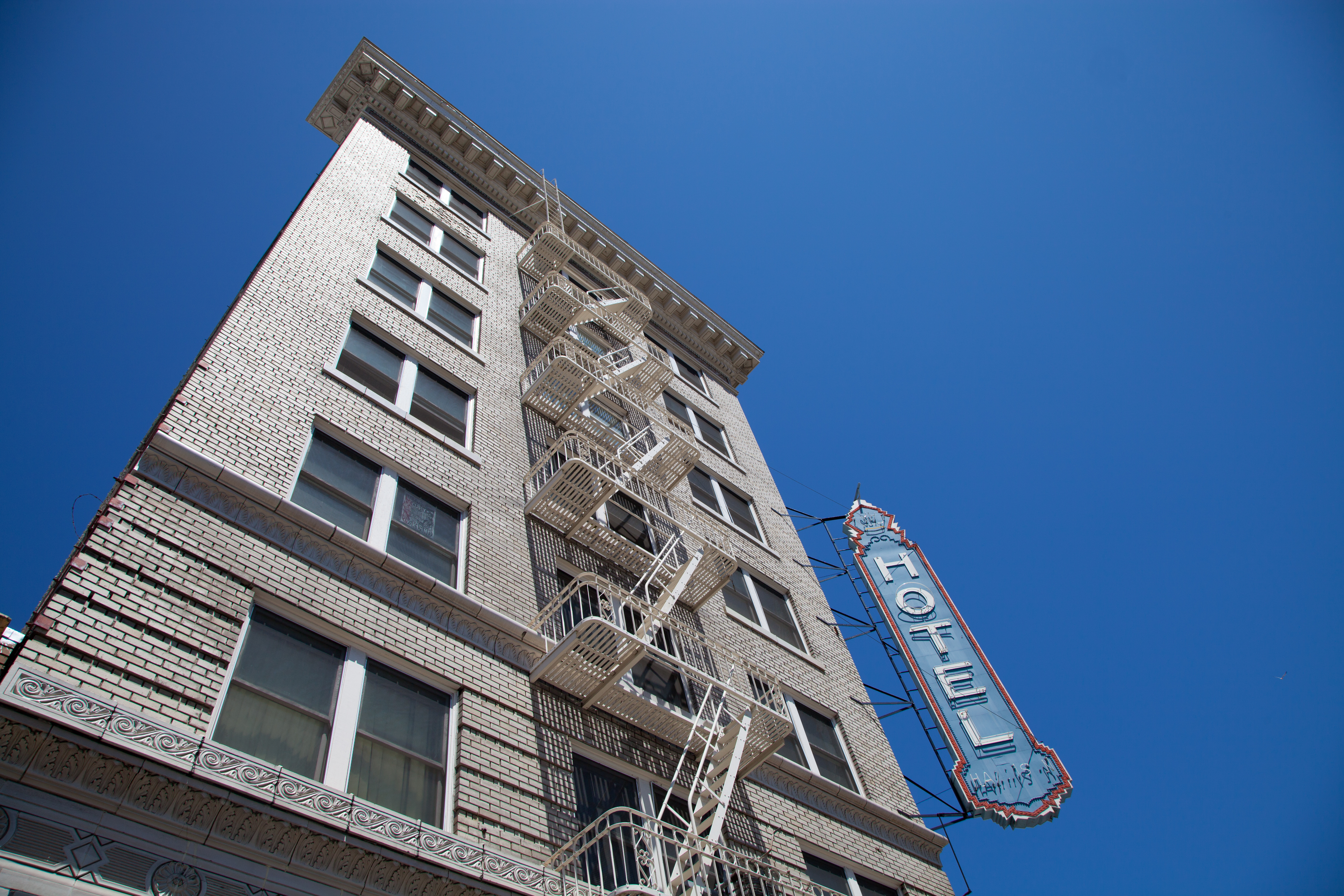

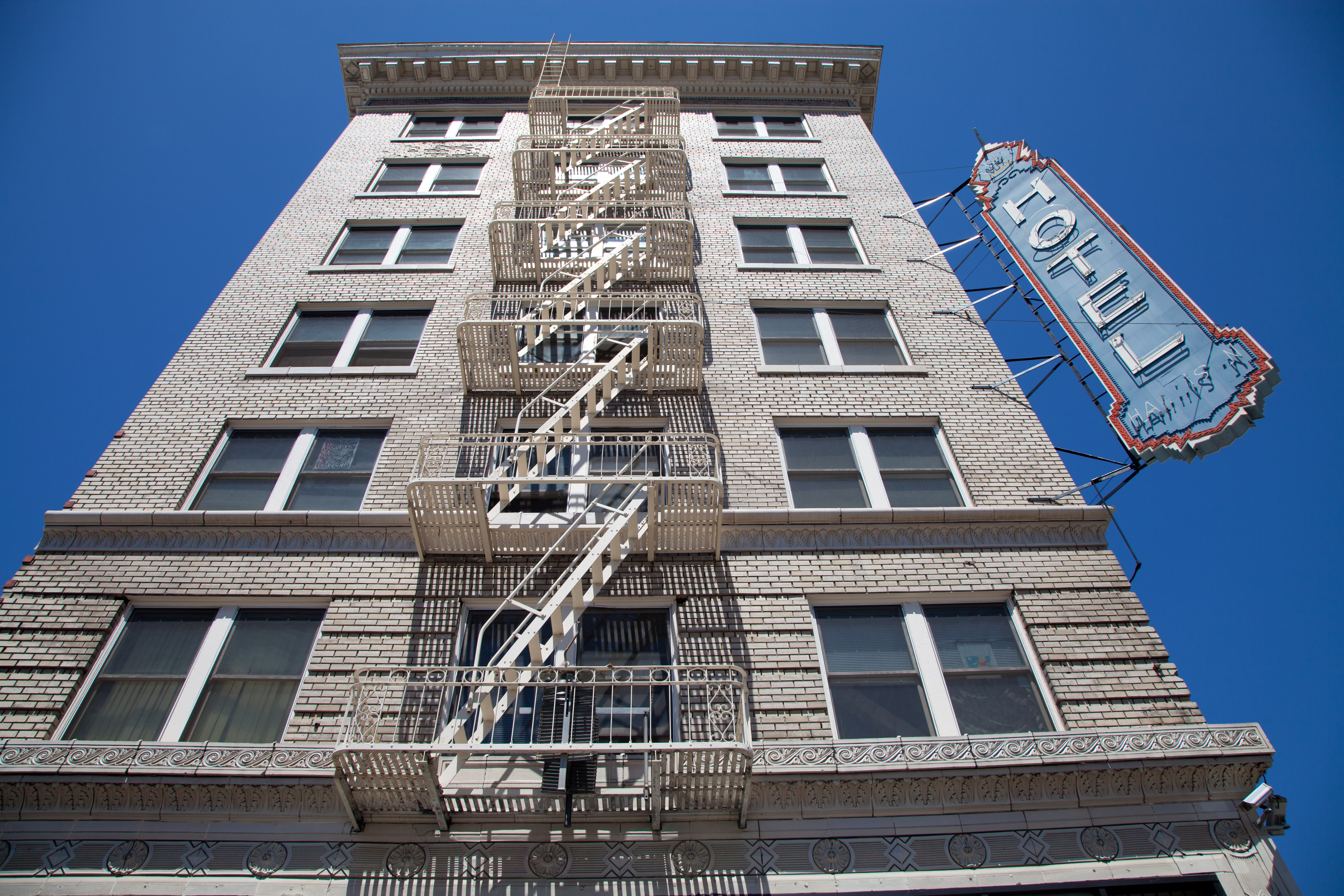

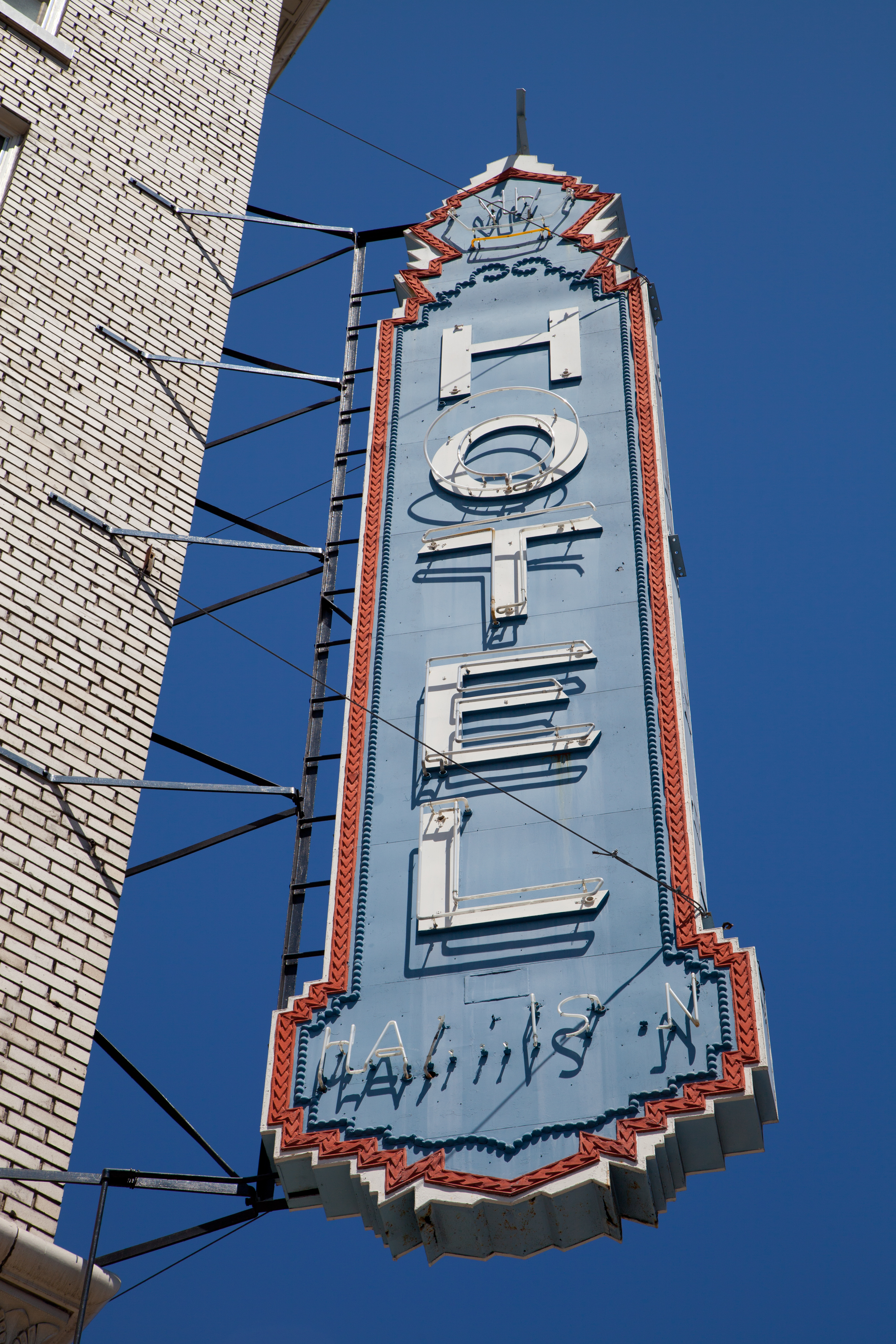

== See also ==
- Downtown Oakland Historic District - nearby historic district
- National Register of Historic Places listings in Alameda County, California
