= Hotel Menlo =

Historic place in Oakland, California

- Hotel Menlo; Empyrean Towers
- U.S. National Register of Historic Places
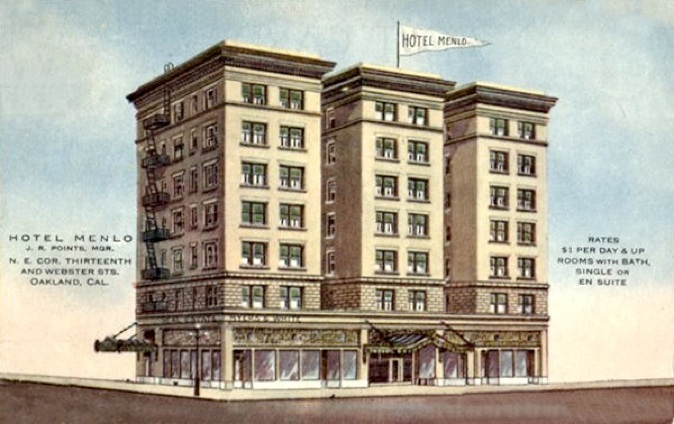
- Hotel Menlo

- Location within Oakland, California Location within California Location within the United States
- Location: 344 13th Street, Oakland, California
- Coordinates: 37.802778°N 122.26888°W
- Built: 1914; 112 years ago
- NRHP reference No.: 100005984
- Added to NRHP: December 29, 2020

Hotel Menlo is a historical building in Oakland, California. The Hotel Menlo was built in 1911. The building was listed on the National Register of Historic Places on December 29, 2020. The Hotel Menlo was founded on June 1, 1914, in downtown Oakland. Myers and White Company built the hotel and had J.R. Points operate the hotel. (This Hotel Menlo should not be confused with the 1901 Hotel Menlo also called the Lillard or Lillard House in Oakland.) The historical Hotel Menlo was closed due to age and converted a residence hotel. Then to the Empyrean Towers Apartments owned by Richard Singer. Richard Singer had trouble with the law over Empyrean Towers Apartments and went to jail. The seven-story building as two U-shaped floor giving the upper floors more windows. The building is noted for having the oldest working elevator in Oakland. The building had been updated to offer newer and safer apartments.

== See also ==
- National Register of Historic Places listings in Alameda County, California
