= Naval Architecture Building =

Historic place in Berkeley, California

- Drawing Building; Naval Architecture Building
- U.S. National Register of Historic Places
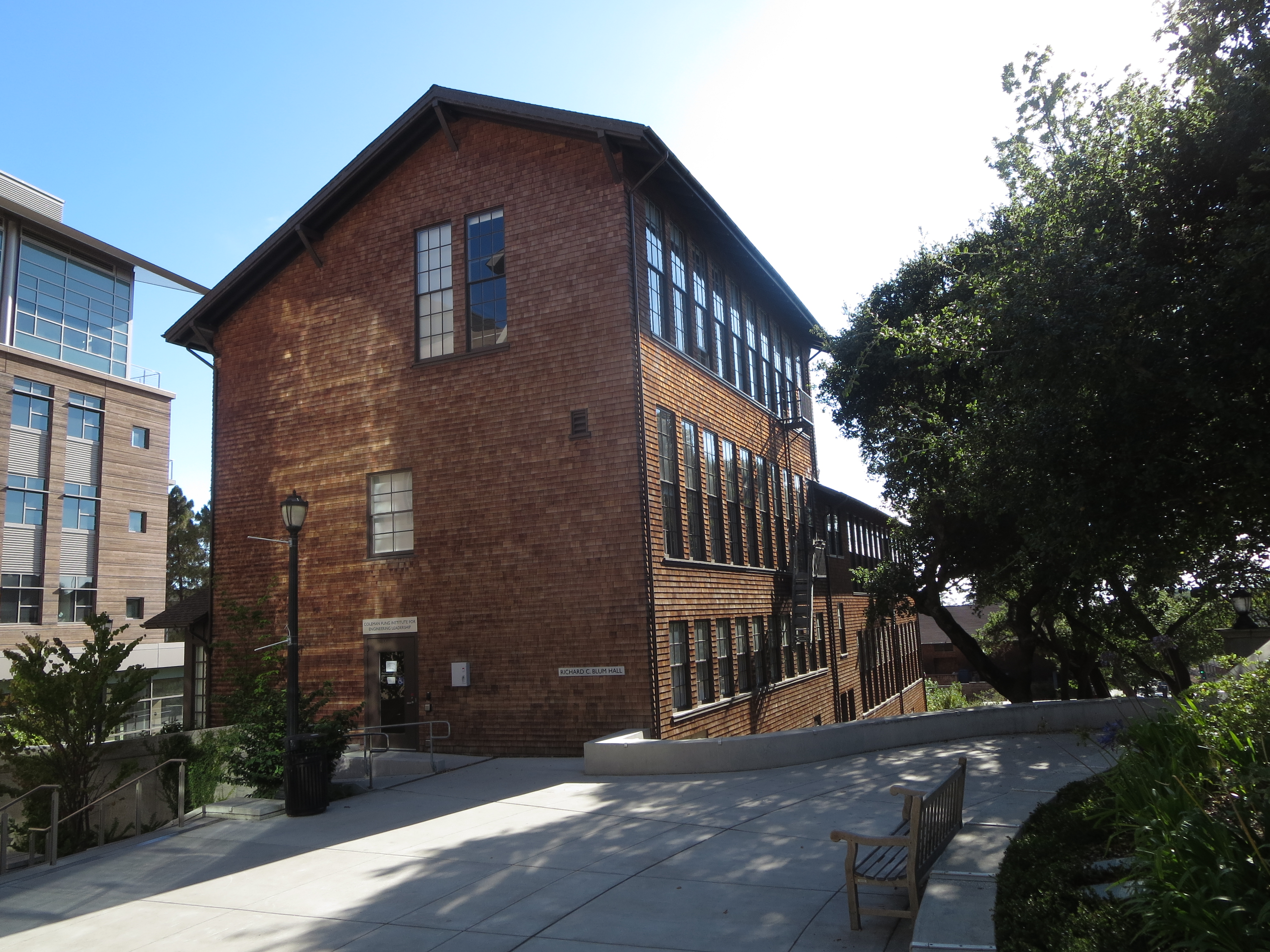
- Drawing Building

- Location within Oakland, California Location within California Location within the United States
- Location: Hearst Avenue, Berkeley, California
- Coordinates: 37.8750945°N 122.2586978°W
- Built: 1914; 112 years ago
- Architect: John Galen Howard
- NRHP reference No.: 76000475
- Added to NRHP: November 18, 1976

The Drawing Building, also called the Naval Architecture Building, is a historical building in Berkeley, California. The Drawing Building was built in 1914. The building and its site was listed on the National Register of Historic Places on November 18, 1976. The Drawing Building was designed by architect John Galen Howard. The Naval Architecture Building is on the University of California Berkeley and is part of Blum Hall Complex, or Richard C. Blum Hall, completed in 2010, after Richard C. Blum. In 2004 the Naval Architecture Building was seismically updated, also a new three-story wing was built, desigened by Gensler Architects. The Blum Hall houses the Blum Center for Developing Economies. In the past the building housed the architecture department, including architect Julia Morgan, who worked on Hearst Castle.

== See also ==
- National Register of Historic Places listings in Alameda County, California
- List of Berkeley Landmarks in Berkeley, California
