= California Hotel =

- U.S. National Register of Historic Places
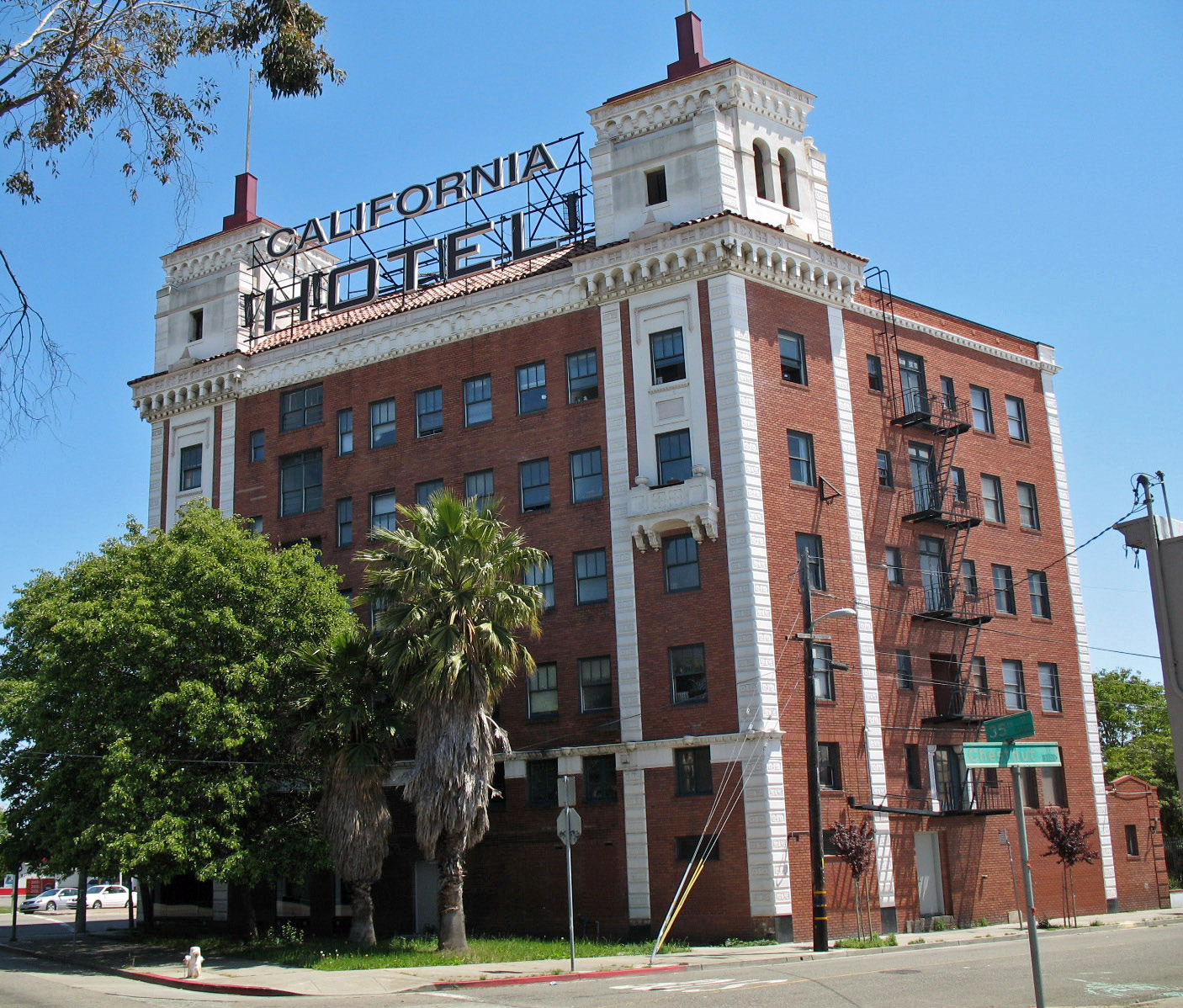
- California Hotel in 2009

- Location within Oakland, California
- Location: 3443–3501 San Pablo Ave., Oakland, California
- Coordinates: 37°49′34″N 122°16′43″W
- Built: 1929–30
- Architects: Clay N. Burrell; Sommarstrom Bros.
- Architectural style: Spanish Colonial Revival
- NRHP reference No.: 88000969
- Added to NRHP: June 30, 1988

The California Hotel is a historic Oakland, California, hotel which opened in the early days of the Great Depression and became an important cultural center for the African-American community of San Francisco's East Bay during the 1940s, 50s and 60s. On June 30, 1988, the hotel was placed on the National Register of Historic Places.

== History ==
The California Hotel opened its doors on May 18, 1930. A 5-story structure with mezzanine and penthouse, it was the tallest building in the area. It cost $265,000 to build the 150-room hotel with commercial space on the ground floor. Though situated 1 1/2 miles from Oakland's city center, the new hotel was within walking distance of the passenger stations for both the Santa Fe Railroad and the regional Key System streetcars.

The hotel was located at 3501 San Pablo Avenue, near major highways, and passing traffic was increased in 1937 by the opening of the San Francisco–Oakland Bay Bridge. In 1962 construction of the elevated MacArthur Freeway blocked the street view of the hotel but made it visible to hundreds of thousands of bridge commuters.

The hotel opened in difficult economic times. The hotel's first manager, Axel Bern, an experienced hotelier, was also an investor. Just four months after the grand opening, Bern was arrested and charged with disturbing the peace after a quarrel in the hotel's lobby. According to a story in the Oakland Tribune, Bern had reneged on his commitment to invest $35,000 into the hotel and had been relieved of his duties as general manager. However, Bern returned to work at the front desk on the day of his arrest.

To attract the car driving public, the hotel's owners added a "motorists patio" in 1933, with a separate entrance from the parking area directly to the lobby. Next to the patio was a garage building, a service station and a repair shop. An advertisement in the 1943 Oakland City Directory described the hotel amenities as "commodious airy rooms, all with shower and tub baths, dining, banquet and meeting rooms, coffee shop and cocktail lounges, garage adjoining".

=== Transformation to a Black Cultural Hub ===
During World War II, the hotel was known for the blues, jazz and similar 'race music' being played in its ground floor bars and ballrooms. African American patrons were denied rooms due to segregation, but they came in large numbers to hear the music. On January 16, 1953, new ownership took control, and the hotel ended its discrimination policies. A grand "reopening" was held with invited guests that included Oakland-born comedian Eddie "Rochester" Anderson, boxing champion Joe Louis and acclaimed singer Lena Horne. The hotel attracted many high-profile black visitors to Oakland. At that time, it was the only full-service hotel that welcomed black people in the East Bay, and was listed in Victor H. Green's famous The Negro Motorist Green Book (commonly known as "The Green Book") as a safe place for Black travelers to stay. The 1956 edition of The Green Book also lists five smaller, less sophisticated Oakland hotels.

=== The Zanzibar Club Era ===
The California Hotel became known not only as a lodging establishment but as a cultural institution where the community gathered for music, dancing, and socializing. The hotel's nightclub space, which operated under various names but was most prominently known as the Zanzibar Club (sometimes called the "Bird Cage"), became one of the West Coast's premier venues for Black entertainment from the late 1940s through the 1960s. The club was part of the "Chitlin' Circuit," an informal network of performance venues throughout the United States that welcomed Black musicians during the era of segregation. Many significant blues and R&B recordings were made by artists during their residencies at the hotel. Wesley "Freddie" Johnson, who managed the club for many years, was known for bringing in top talent from across the country. African American entertainers who lodged and performed at the hotel included Big Mama Thornton, B. B. King, Lou Rawls, James Brown, Etta James, Sam Cooke, Ray Charles and Richard Pryor.

After the 1960s, the hotel, as with many dedicated African American institutions and businesses in the area, declined; black entertainers could now stay in any hotel, and patrons followed them to white-owned clubs and other venues.

By the 1970s, the hotel was in bad condition and was boarded up. In the 1980s, it was repaired and rented out as subsidized housing.

In 2012, a start was made on restoring the building and in 2014, after a renovation costing $43 million, it was once more opened as low-rental housing.

== Description ==
The California Hotel, constructed in 1929–1930, is a 5-story and Mezzanine and penthouse, L-plan structure made of reinforced concrete, designed in the Spanish Colonial Revival Style. Situated in west Oakland near the border of Emeryville and adjacent to the MacArthur Freeway (Interstate 580), the building stands out with its pressed red brick exterior in American bond, complemented by off-white and painted Stucco trim. Notably, the north facade features two off-square towers, making it the tallest building in the vicinity. The ground floor houses a well-preserved original southwest-style lobby.

Since its inception, the structure has seen minimal changes. Initially intended as a 150-room commercial hotel with ground-floor commercial spaces and permanent units, the hotel/residential floors have remained vacant for the past twelve years. There are ongoing plans to rehabilitate and convert these floors into low-income housing. Despite being in a run-down condition with some missing ornaments and minor vandalism, the California Hotel retains its original character, including tiled parapets, a galvanized iron Cornice, tile storefront bases (now painted), mezzanine clerestory windows covered with modern metal cladding, a metal marquee, and most of the original windows.

The building's L-plan spans approximately 214 feet along San Pablo Avenue, forming a polygonal lot resembling a flatiron with the tip cut off. The main arm of the L-plan contains a lobby, commercial spaces on the ground floor and mezzanine, and hotel units on the floors above. The northern arm extends 80 feet back from San Pablo, housing a balconied lobby and Banquet room, apartment units on floors two through five, and a penthouse with observation towers.

The hotel parking lot, accessed through the original gateway on San Pablo Avenue, retains its brick pylons and metal Arch, though a new gate has been installed. However, the rear section of the lot has become an abandoned junkyard. Adjacent to the building, there used to be an auto repair shed along the Chestnut Street line, and several small 1-story structures, including a 1956 concrete block addition, a 1939 frame bottle storage shed altered in 1946, are slated for demolition. Brick 1-story entry, storage, and mechanical rooms at the rear angle of the L-plan will be retained.

The San Pablo facade is a two-part vertical composition, divided into five bays with off-white stucco panels and featuring balconies resting on consoles. The storefronts maintain their original Clerestory windows behind 1971 metal cladding, with bases clad in glossy black glazed ceramic tiles. The lobby windows, although altered, retain the original metal marquee and entry lanterns. The lobby itself, though unfurnished, preserves its original design, including a mezzanine balcony, stenciled ceiling panels, a Terrazzo floor, and a Fireplace with Mayan-style relief tiles.

Each unit's bathroom features glazed ceramic tile wainscot in various color combinations, showcasing a range of unique designs. The building's roof, offering a 360° view, once hosted a neon-lit roof sign, "CALIFORNIA HOTEL," between the towers. The sign framework still stands, albeit empty and rickety. Despite the wear and tear, the California Hotel reflects its historic charm, awaiting potential restoration and revitalization efforts.
