= The Bellevue-Staten =

Historic place in Oakland, California

- U.S. National Register of Historic Places
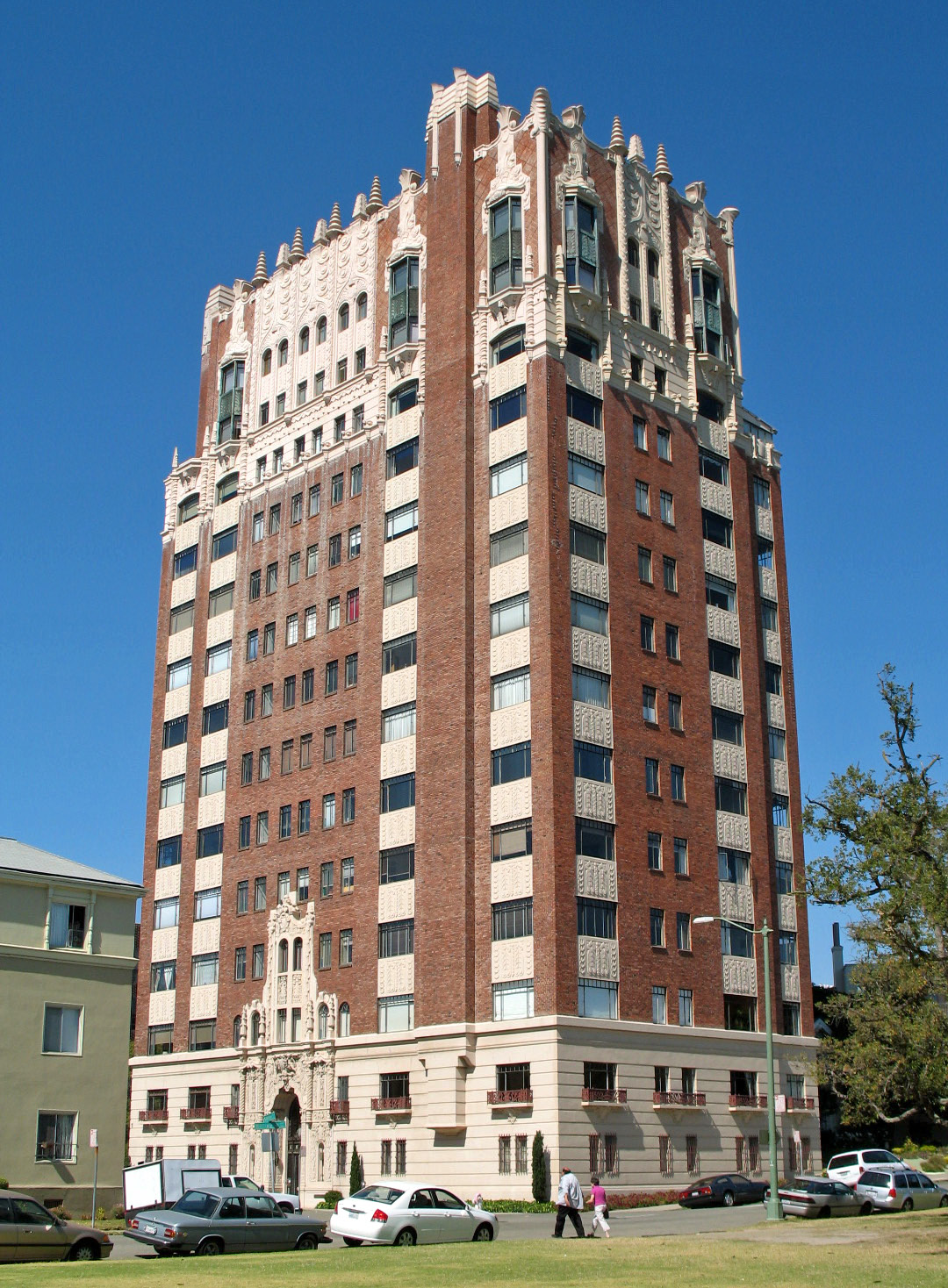
- The Bellevue-Staten

- Location within Oakland, California Location within California Location within the United States
- Location: 492 Staten Ave, Oakland, California
- Coordinates: 37.807933°N 122.253800°W
- Built: 1929; 97 years ago
- Architect: Herman Carl Baumann
- Architectural style: Art Deco and Spanish Colonial
- NRHP reference No.: 06001218
- Added to NRHP: December 27, 1991

The Bellevue-Staten is a 14-story residential condominium complex in downtown Oakland, California, located at the corner of Bellevue and Staten Avenues, as the name suggests. Originally built in 1929, the building has been listed in the National Register of Historic Places since December 27, 1991. The Bellevue-Staten was designed by Herman Carl Baumann in the Art Deco and Spanish Colonial architectural styles.

Due to likeness to the building used in the 1984 movie Ghostbusters, locals call it the Ghostbusters Building. The Bellevue-Staten building is in the Adams Point neighborhood of Oakland.

Architect Herman Carl Baumann (1890–1960), was born in Oakland in 1890 and had an architect office in San Francisco. Baumann died on April 6, 1960, in San Francisco. Baumann also desigened the Bellaire Tower and the Gaylord Hotel (1929) in San Francisco' Lower Nob Hill Apartment Hotel District. Baumann designs are found in San Francisco, Oakland, and Sacramento, over 500 apartment buildings. During World War II, he designed building for the United States Navy at the Mare Island Naval Shipyard.

== See also ==
- National Register of Historic Places listings in Alameda County, California
