= Clay Building =

Historic place in Oakland, California

- U.S. National Register of Historic Places
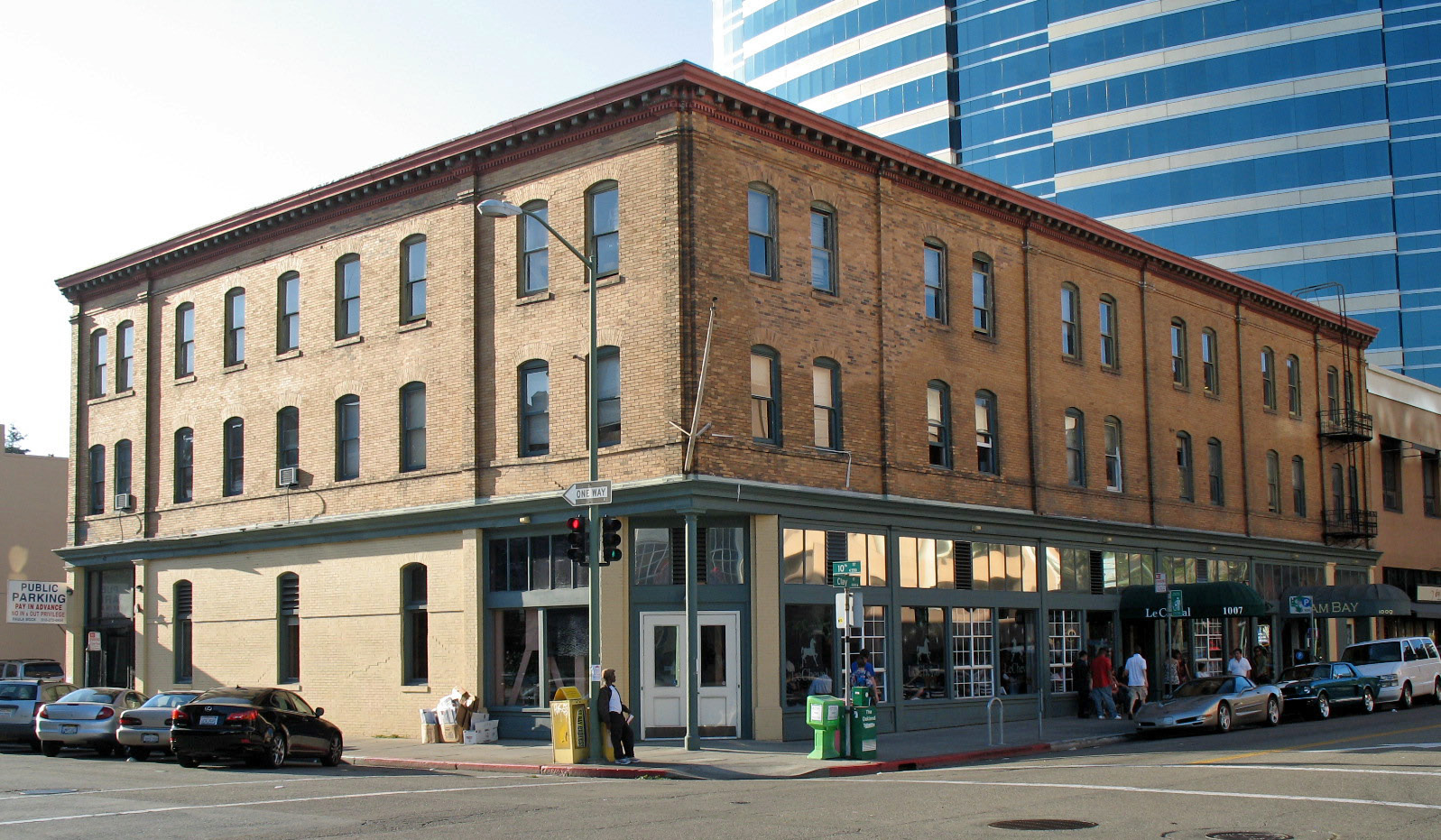
- Clay Building

- Location within Oakland, California Location within California Location within the United States
- Location: 1001–1007 Clay Street, Oakland, California
- Coordinates: 37.802778°N 122.275278°W
- Built: 1901; 125 years ago
- NRHP reference No.: 78000650
- Added to NRHP: November 20, 1978

Clay Building is a historical building in downtown Oakland, California, built in 1901. The three-story brick building was listed on the National Register of Historic Places on November 20, 1978. The Clay Building suffered major damage in the 1906 San Francisco earthquake. The Clay Building initially served as a Levi Strauss factory. After the earthquake, the company moved its staff and executives into the building, making it its temporary headquarters between April to September 1906. In 1909, Theodore Eliopolous's Eliopoulos Hellenic Company, an Egyptian cigar manufacturer, moved into the third floor. The Eliopoulos Hellenic Company subsequently moved to Webster Street after it was acquired by John Fisher. Harry Bercovich opened a cigar shop in 1924 in the Clay Building. After 1926, David Bercovich, a relative of Harry, operated out of the building as an auctioneer for some years. The 1989 Loma Prieta earthquake damaged the building but it was later repaired. Between 1985 to 2023, Vietnamese-fusion restaurant Le Cheval operated on the ground floor. In 2022, Tigrai Cafe also opened on the ground floor.

== Gallery ==
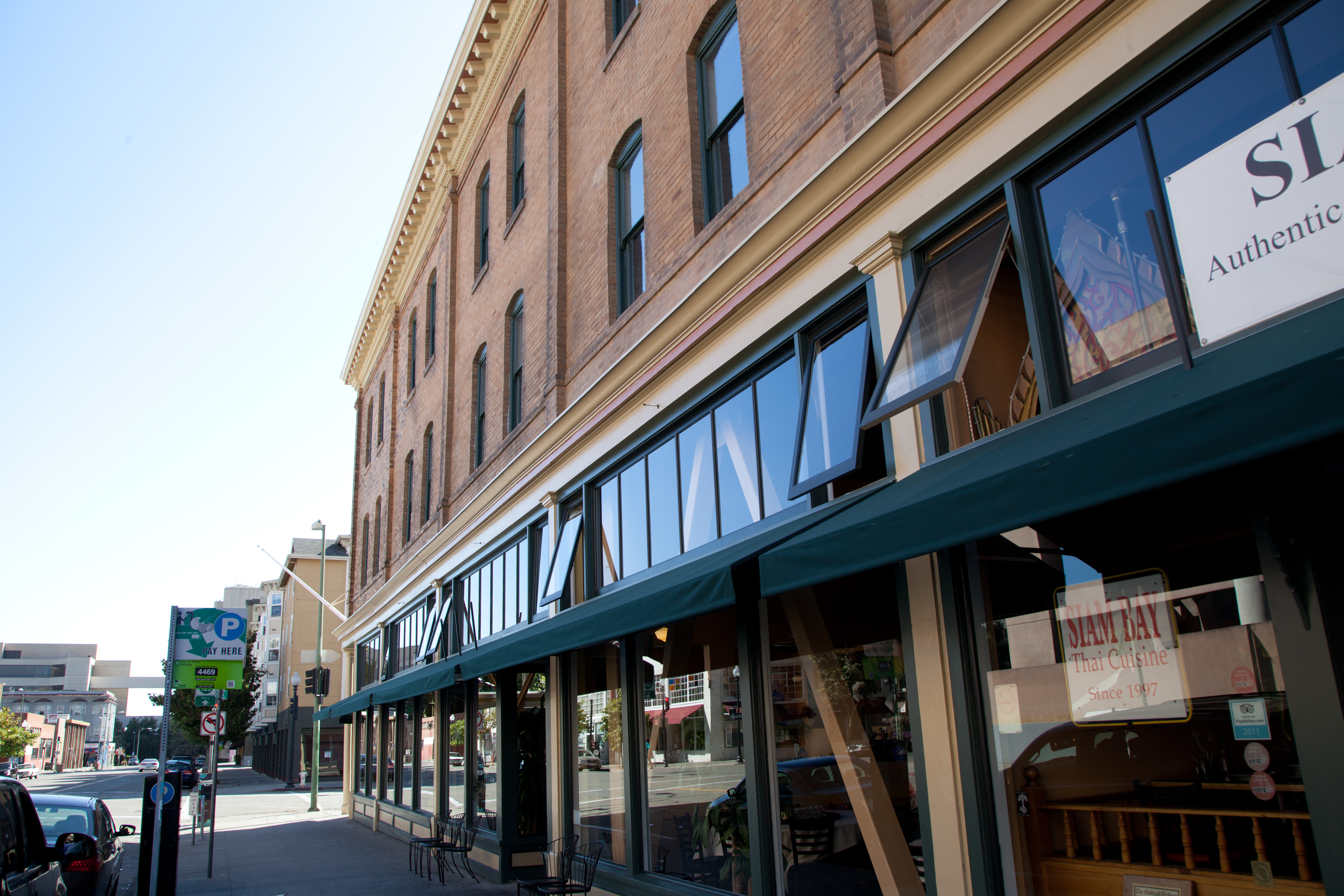

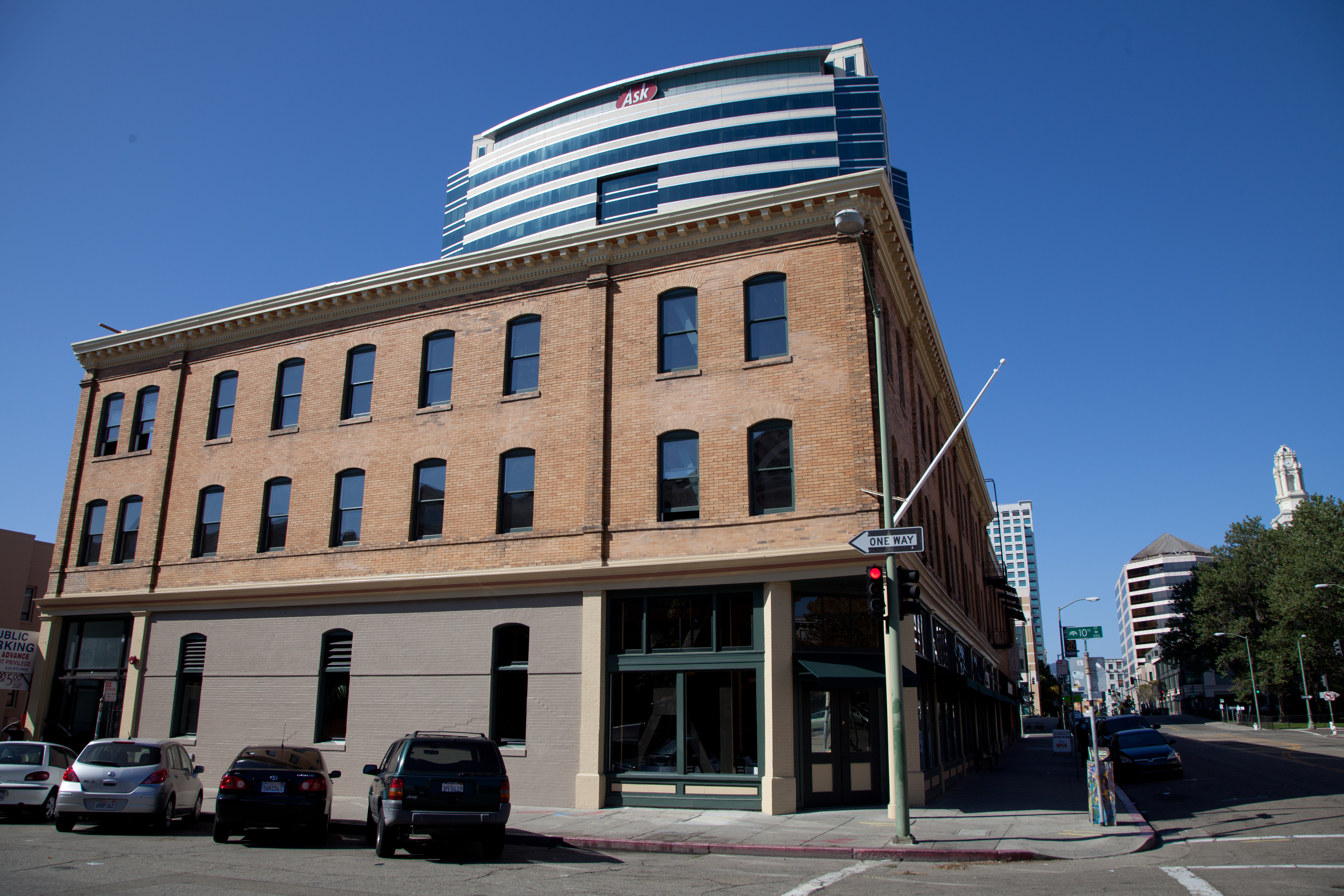

== See also ==
- National Register of Historic Places listings in Alameda County, California
