= California Cotton Mills Company Factory =

Historic place in Oakland, California

- U.S. National Register of Historic Places
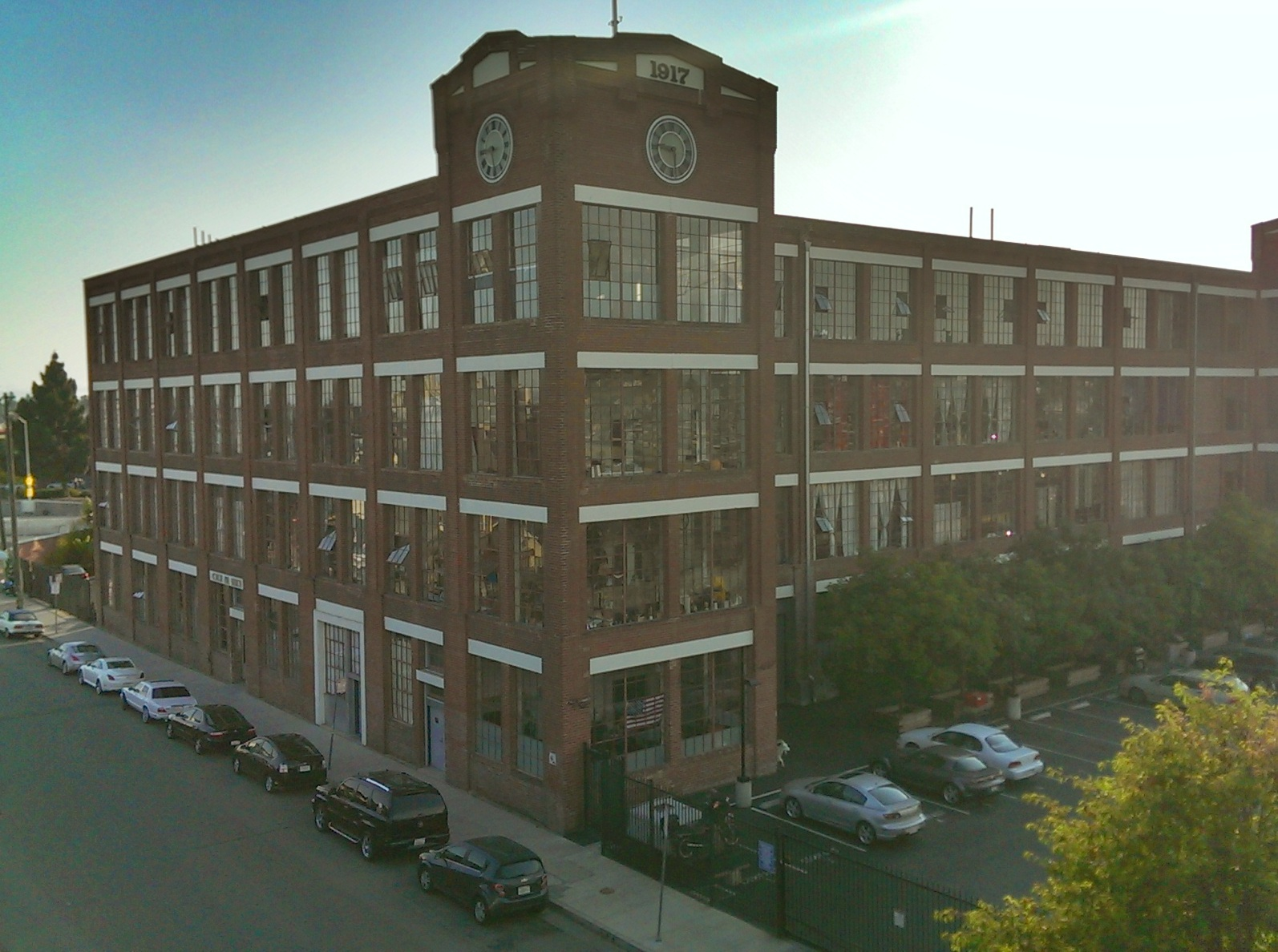
- California Cotton Mills Company Factory

- Location within Oakland, California Location within California Location within the United States
- Location: 1091 Calcot Pl., Oakland, California
- Coordinates: 37.78155°N 122.238056°W
- Area: 12 acres (4.9 ha)
- Built: 1883; 143 years ago
- Architect: Arthur C. Griewank
- Architectural style: Industrial brick
- NRHP reference No.: 12001234
- Added to NRHP: January 30, 2013

California Cotton Mills Company Factory is a historical building in Oakland, California Fruitvale neighborhood. The California Cotton Mills Company Factory was founded in 1883. The building was listed on the National Register of Historic Places on January 30, 2013. California Cotton Mills Company Factory was founded by Scotsmans William Rutherford and John Yule Millar. When completed it was the largest cotton mill west of the Mississippi River. Rail freight train cars full of cotton arrived at the factory. California Cotton Mills Company Factory manufactured comforters, drapery cloth, table padding, towels and mops. During World War I and World War II it has 1,500 employees made: tents, parachutes and fabric for the United States Armed Forces. The current buildings were built in 1917, replacing the older original 1883 buildings. The 1917 buildings were designed by Civil Engineer, Arthur C. Griewank. After the war on June 30, 1954, the mills closed. Some of the buildings were removed for the completion of the nearby Interstate 880. The main building of the California Cotton Mills Company Factory has been converted into the California Cotton Mills Studios, which opened in March 2006. The 138,000 Sq. foot California Cotton Mills Studios gives artist and small businesses, if they wish, the ability to live and work in a studio. California Cotton Mills Studios has in its lobby a small museum about the California Cotton Mills Company Factory.

== See also ==
- National Register of Historic Places listings in Alameda County, California
