= Montgomery Ward Building (Oakland, California) =

#REDIRECT National Register of Historic Places listings in Alameda County, California#montgomery_ward_oakland

- To an embedded anchor: This is a redirect from a topic that does not have its own page to an embedded anchor on the redirect's target page.
  - An {{anchor|anchor name}} or {{visible anchor}} template, an HTML element with id="anchor name", or an |id=anchor name parameter can be placed at the beginning of a paragraph, substituted into a section header, or inserted within a table. Anchors may also be old section headers that have since been renamed, in order to preserve existing internal and external links.
  - Although section headers of the form ==(Header name)== act as anchors by default, with them use {{R to section}} instead.
