= Alameda Veterans' Memorial Building =

Historic place in Alameda, California

- U.S. National Register of Historic Places
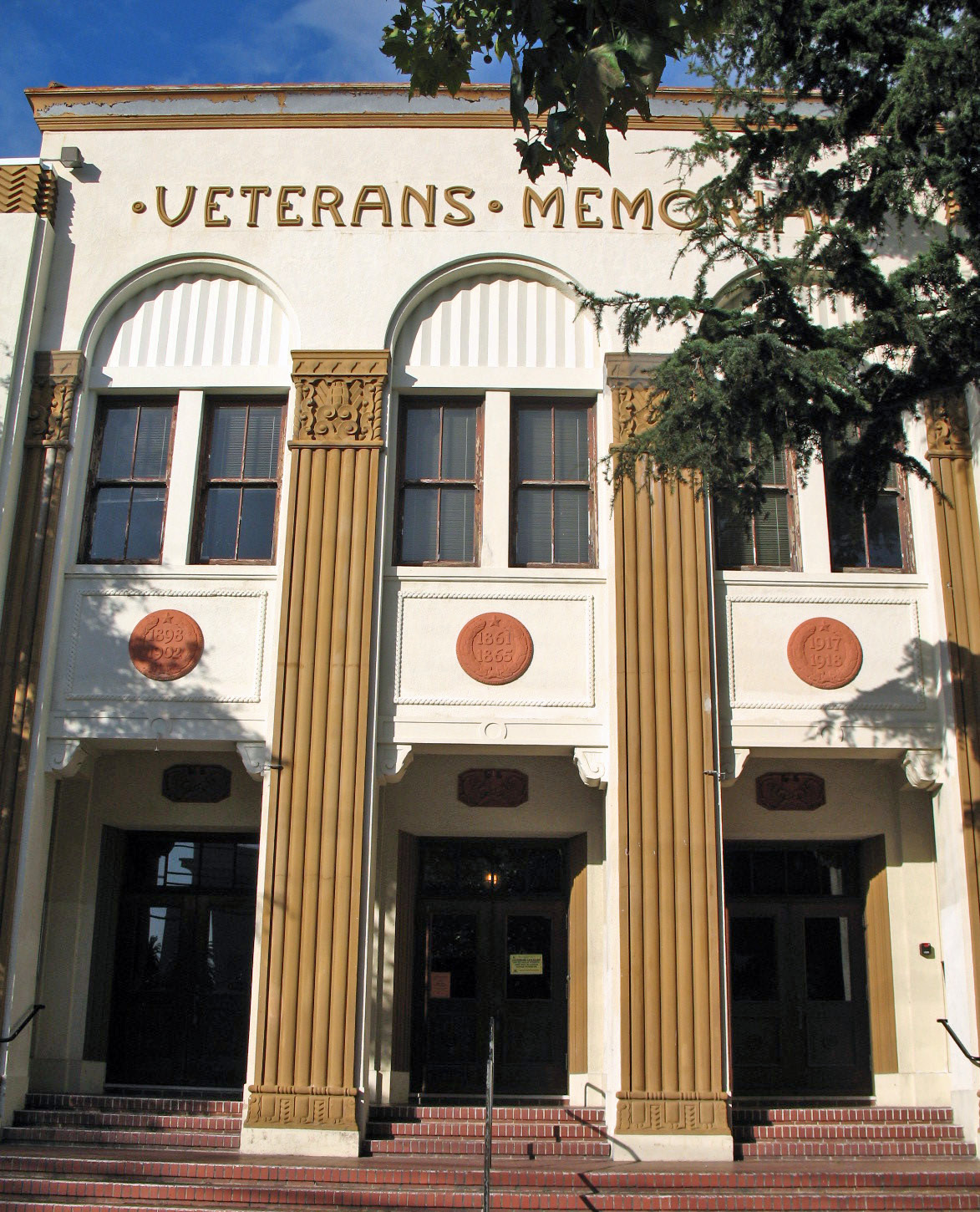
- Alameda Veterans' Memorial Building

- Location within Oakland, California Location within California Location within the United States
- Location: 2203 Central Ave., Alameda, California
- Coordinates: 37.766186°N 122.246475°W
- Built: 1929; 97 years ago
- Architect: Henry H. Meyers
- Architectural style: Spanish Colonial Revival
- NRHP reference No.: 07000995
- Added to NRHP: September 27, 2007

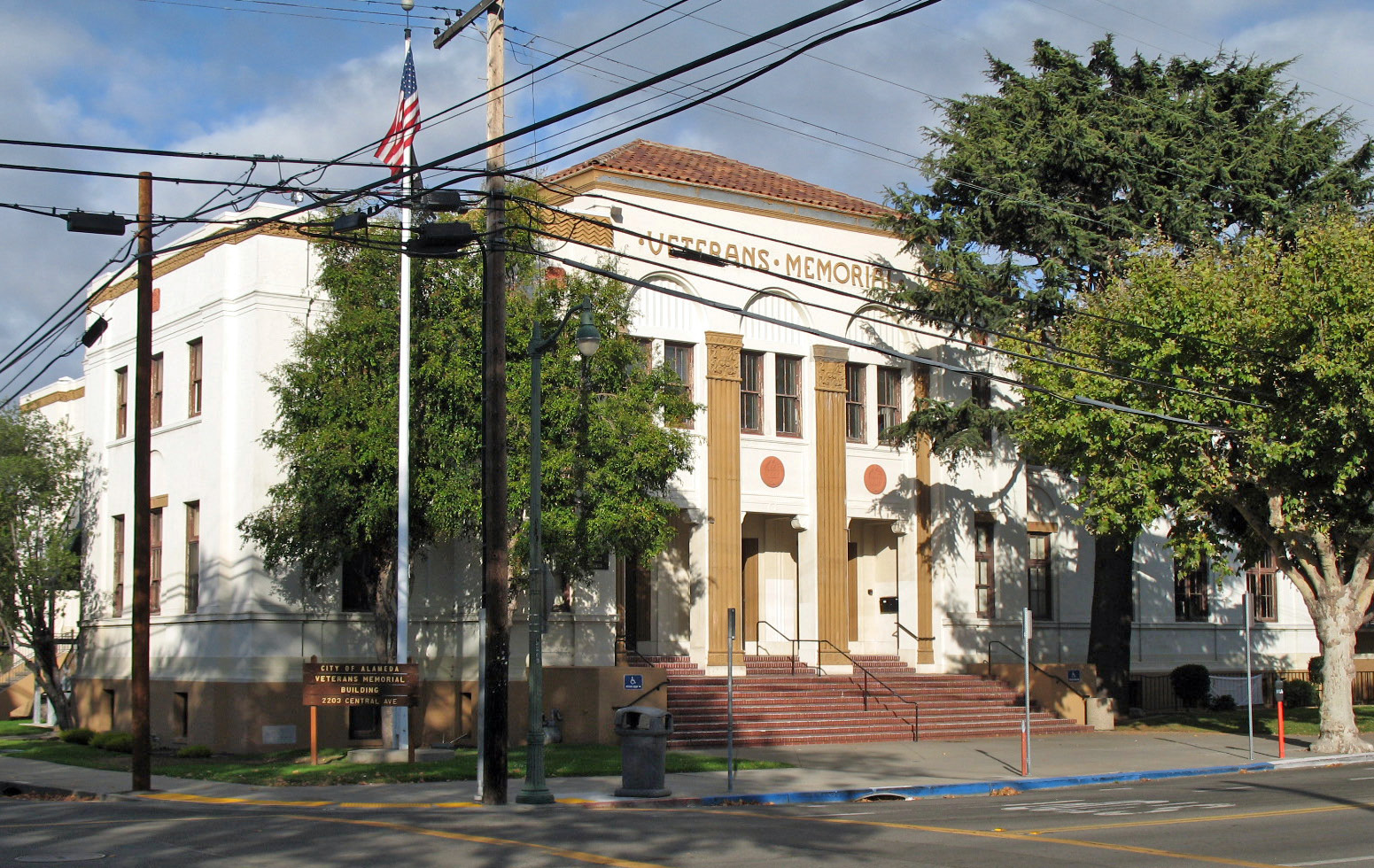
Alameda Veterans' Memorial Building

Alameda Veterans' Memorial Building is a historical building in Alameda, California. The 2203 Central Ave building was built in 1929. The building was listed to the National Register of Historic Places on September 27, 2007. The Alameda Veterans' Memorial Building was built in the Spanish Colonial Revival architecture and designed by Henry H. Meyers. The building was built in 1929 and as some Art Deco details as memorial to United States Armed Forces Veterans. The Alameda Veterans' Memorial Building is located at 2203 Central Ave in Alameda. The Alameda Veterans' Memorial 60,000 square foot building is owned by Alameda County, California and can be rented for events.

== See also ==
- National Register of Historic Places listings in Alameda County, California
