= Downtown Oakland Historic District =

Historic district in California, United States

- U.S. National Register of Historic Places
- U.S. Historic district
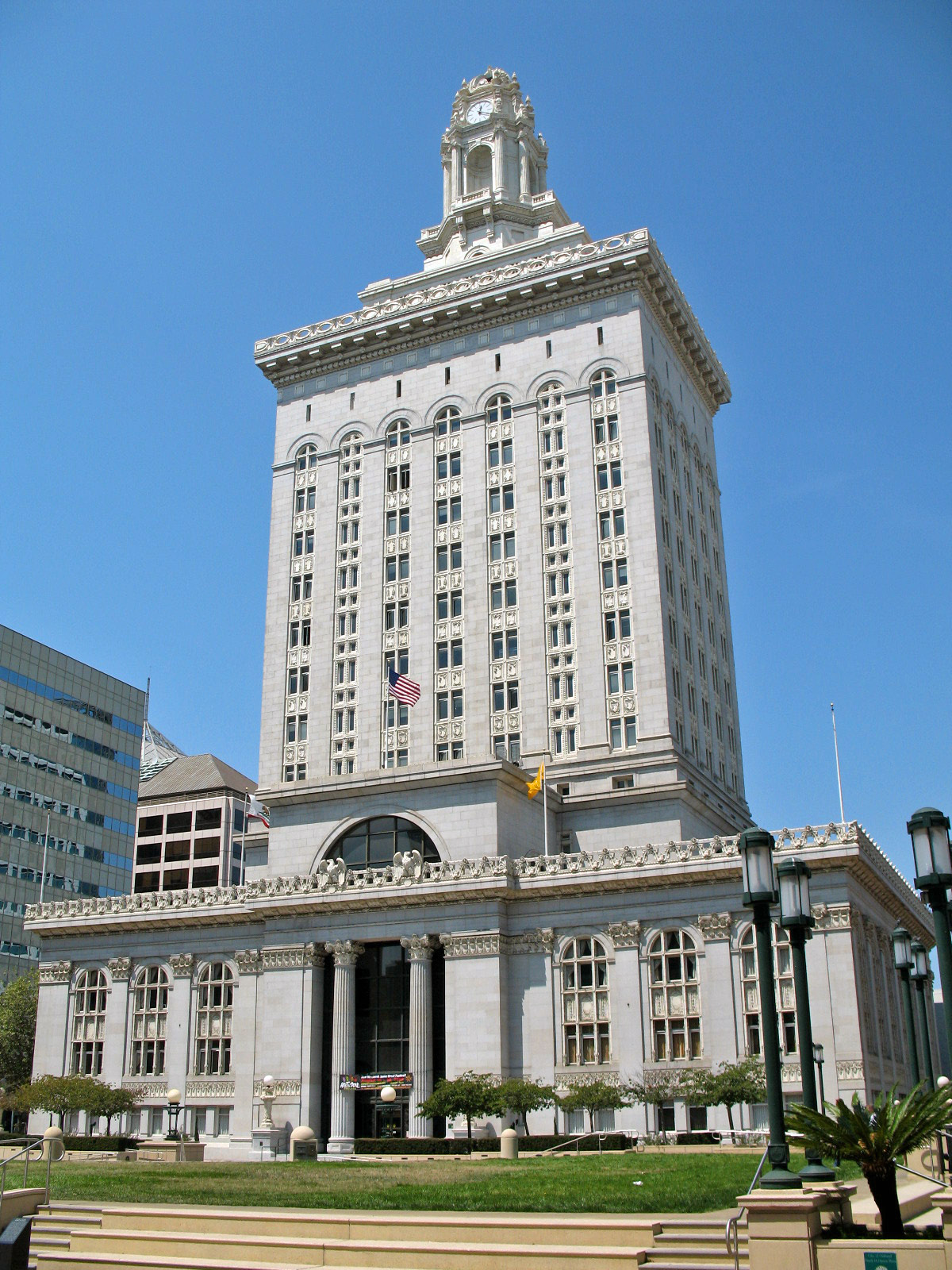
- Oakland City Hall

- Location within Oakland, California Location within California Location within the United States
- Location: Roughly along Broadway from 17th to 11th St., Oakland, California
- Coordinates: 37°48′16″N 122°16′15″W
- Area: 26 acres (11 ha)
- Architects: Reed & Corlett, et al.
- Architectural style: Beaux Arts, Late Gothic Revival, Moderne
- NRHP reference No.: 98000813
- Added to NRHP: July 1, 1998

The Downtown Oakland Historic District, in the Downtown Oakland area of Oakland, California, was listed on the National Register of Historic Places in 1998. The listing included 43 contributing buildings, one contributing site and one contributing object.

The district is a roughly L-shaped irregular area comprising about 11 city blocks. It includes Oakland's City Hall building, which is separately listed on the National Register.

== See also ==
- Harrison and Fifteenth Streets Historic District - nearby historic district
