= New Hotel Carquinez =

- U.S. National Register of Historic Places
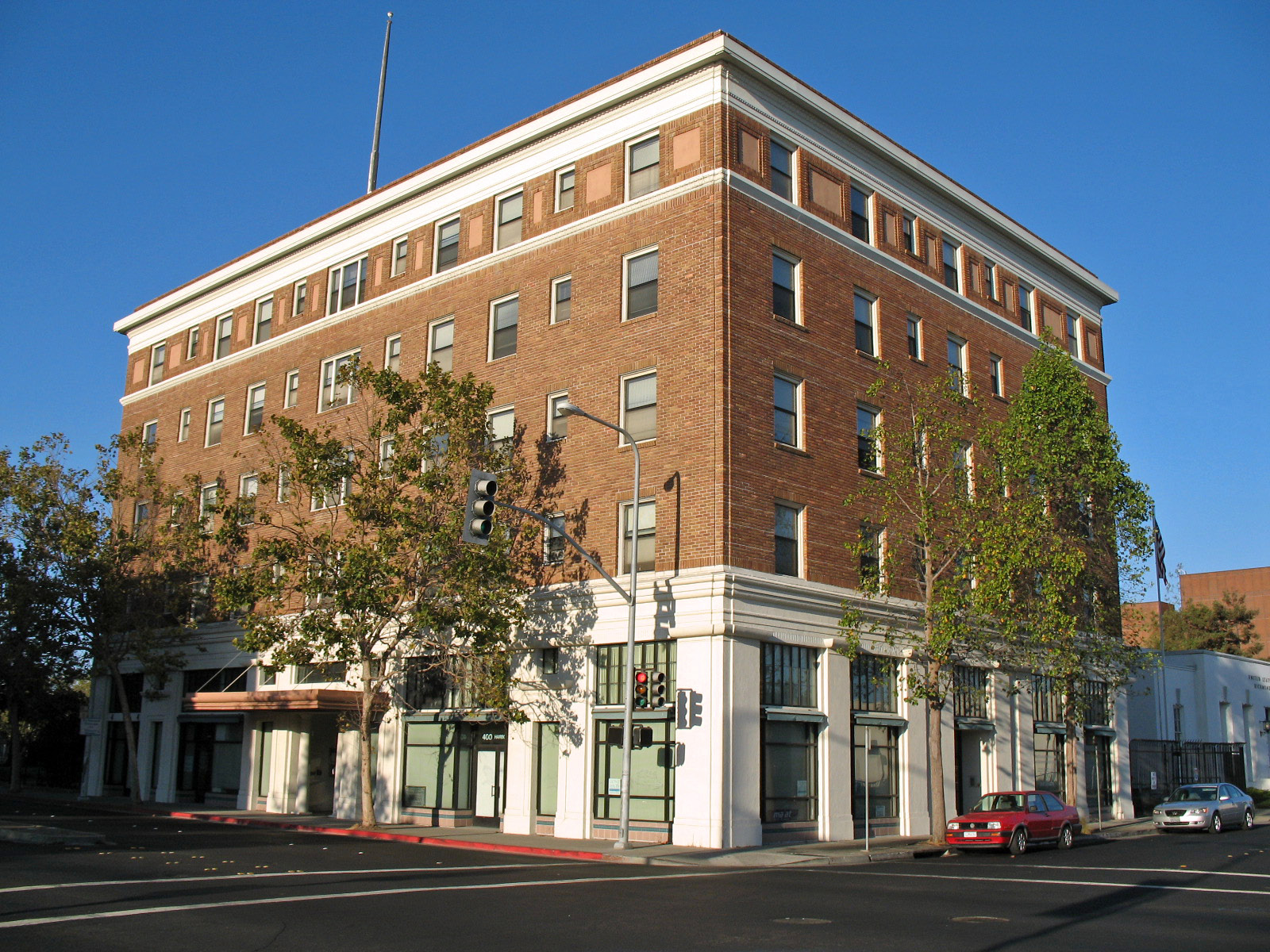

- Location within San Francisco Bay Area Location within California Location within the United States
- Location: 410 Harbour Way, Richmond, California (Iron Triangle)
- Coordinates: 37°56′14″N 122°21′34″W
- Area: 0.5 acres (0.20 ha)
- Built: 1926
- Architect: James W. Plachek
- Architectural style: Late 19th And Early 20th Century American Movements, Sullivanesque
- NRHP reference No.: 92000466
- Added to NRHP: May 7, 1992

The New Hotel Carquinez or simply Hotel Carquinez is a registered historic place in Richmond, California. It is located in the Iron Triangle at 410 Harbor Way. It is named after the Carquinez Strait. The New Hotel Carquinez was the original name, and it was later changed to Hotel Don. The building currently functions as senior housing center. The hotel was the center of decision making for the city of Richmond prior to the construction of the Richmond Civic Center.

== See also ==
- National Register of Historic Places listings in Contra Costa County, California
