= List of civic centers =

Civic Center or Civic Centre names a prominent land area within a community that is constructed to be its focal point or center.

Specific civic centers include the following:

== Canada ==
- Ottawa Civic Centre

== Pakistan ==
- Civil Center, Karachi

== South Africa ==
- Cape Town Civic Centre, Cape Town, a prominent high-rise in the CBD, housing the offices of the City of Cape Town metro government

== United Kingdom ==
- Cardiff Civic Centre, also known as Cathays Park
- Hampstead Civic Centre, which was only partially completed (the Swiss Cottage Library)
- Sunderland Civic Centre
- St. Albans Civic Centre which includes in the Alban Arena
- Civic Centre, Dagenham
- Newcastle Civic Centre
- Southampton Civic Centre
- Newport Civic Centre
- Swansea Civic Centre
- Civic Centre, an old official name for the town centre of Wythenshawe in Manchester, England

== United States (by state) ==
- Civic Center, Manhattan
- Pine Bluff Civic Center, in Pine Bluff, Arkansas, listed on the NRHP in Arkansas
- Azusa Civic Center, in Azusa, CA, listed on the NRHP (National Register of Historic Places) in California
- Baltimore Civic Center, in Baltimore, Maryland, since 2014 the Royal Farms Arena
- Berkeley Historic Civic Center District, in Berkeley, California, listed on the NRHP in California
- Civic Center, Los Angeles, California, a neighborhood in Downtown Los Angeles including a cluster of government buildings
- Civic Center Financial District (Pasadena, California), listed on the NRHP in California
- San Diego Civic Center, in San Diego, California, listed on the NRHP in California
- San Francisco Civic Center Historic District, in San Francisco, California, (see Civic Center, San Francisco below) listed on the NRHP in California
- Civic Center, San Francisco, San Francisco, California
- Marin County Civic Center, in San Rafael, California, listed on the NRHP in California
- Olive Civic Center, in Orange, California, listed on the NRHP in Orange County, California
- Pasadena Civic Center District, in Pasadena, California, listed on the NRHP in California
- Denver Civic Center, Denver, Colorado (see Civic Center Historic District below)
- Civic Center Historic District (Denver, Colorado), listed on the NRHP in Denver, Colorado
- Hartford Civic Center, a sports and convention center in Hartford, Connecticut
- St. Augustine Civic Center, St. Augustine, FL, listed on the NRHP in Florida
- Tallahassee-Leon County Civic Center, Tallahassee, Florida, which includes Donald L. Tucker Center, a multi-purpose arena
- Lihue Civic Center Historic District, Lihue, Hawaii, listed on the NRHP in Hawaii
- Wailuku Civic Center Historic District, Wailuku, Hawaii, listed on the NRHP in Hawaii
- Peoria Civic Center, a convention center with an arena in downtown Peoria, Illinois
- Civic Center of Greater Des Moines, Iowa
- Civic Center Historic District (Des Moines, Iowa), listed on the NRHP in Iowa
- Cumberland County Civic Center, now the Cross Insurance Arena, an arena in Portland, Maine
- Peabody Civic Center Historic District, Peabody, Massachusetts, listed on the NRHP in Massachusetts
- Duluth Civic Center Historic District, Duluth, Minnesota, listed on the NRHP in Minnesota
- Saint Paul Civic Center Arena, a former arena in the RiverCentre of St. Paul, Minnesota
- Griswold Civic Center Historic District, Allegan, Michigan, listed on the NRHP in Michigan
- Mid-Hudson Civic Center, Poughkeepsie, New York
- Hamilton Historic Civic Center, Hamilton, Ohio, listed on the NRHP in Ohio
- Civic Center (Bartlesville, Oklahoma), listed on the NRHP in Oklahoma
- Barrington Civic Center, Barrington, RI, listed on the NRHP in Rhode Island
- Providence Civic Center, former name of Dunkin' Donuts Center in Providence, Rhode Island
- Warwick Civic Center Historic District, Warwick, Rhode Island, listed on the NRHP in Rhode Island
- Florence Civic Center, an arena in Florence, South Carolina
- Longview Civic Center Historic District, Longview, Washington, listed on the NRHP in Washington
- Civic Center Historic District (Kenosha, Wisconsin), listed on the NRHP in Wisconsin

== Other places ==
- Civic Center (Shenzhen)
- Civic Center (Delhi)

== See also ==
- Civic Center Historic District (disambiguation)
- Civic Center station (disambiguation)
