= Civic Center Historic District =

Civic Center Historic District may refer to:

- Berkeley Historic Civic Center District, a National Register of Historic Places listing in Alameda County, California
- Columbus Civic Center Historic District in Columbus, Ohio
- San Francisco Civic Center Historic District, in San Francisco, California
- Pasadena Civic Center District, in Pasadena, California
- Civic Center Historic District (Denver, Colorado), a National Register of Historic Places listing in downtown Denver
- Lihue Civic Center Historic District, Lihue, Hawaii
- Wailuku Civic Center Historic District, Wailuku, Hawaii
- Civic Center Historic District (Des Moines, Iowa)
- Peabody Civic Center Historic District, Peabody, Massachusetts
- Duluth Civic Center Historic District, Duluth, Minnesota
- Griswold Civic Center Historic District, Allegan, Michigan
- Warwick Civic Center Historic District, Warwick, Rhode Island
- Longview Civic Center Historic District, a National Register of Historic Places listing in Cowlitz County, Washington
- Civic Center Historic District (Kenosha, Wisconsin)

== See also ==
- Civic Center
