= Maudelle Shirek =

American activist and mayor

Maudelle Shirek (June 18, 1911 – April 11, 2013) was an American activist, former Vice Mayor and eight-term City Council member in Berkeley, California. When she left office at age 92 in 2004, she was the oldest publicly elected official in California.

== Biography ==
Shirek was born in Jefferson, Arkansas and grew up on a farm, the granddaughter of slaves. She moved to Berkeley in the 1940s after witnessing the lynching of a relative. She married Brownlee Shirek and worked as office manager for the Co-op Credit Union.

She was active in the anti-war movement, was a staunch union supporter, founded two Berkeley senior centers, championed HIV/AIDS awareness, and helped organize the Free Mandela movement. She was one of the first elected officials in the United States to advocate for a needle exchange program.

After being forced to retire from her job as director of a Berkeley senior center because of her age, Shirek ran for city council at the age of 73. She served 8 consecutive terms from 1984 to 2004. At the end of her tenure, aged 92, she was one of the oldest elected officials in the State of California.

In 2005, Berkeley sought to name the Berkeley main post office after Shirek, but the attempt was defeated in Congress due to Republican opposition led by Iowa Congressman Steve King, who took issue with her connection to Oakland's Niebyl-Proctor Marxist Library and her support for the release of Mumia Abu-Jamal.

In 2007, the Berkeley City Council renamed the Old Berkeley City Hall in her honor. A San Francisco Chronicle article referred to Shirek as "the godmother of East Bay progressive politics."
