= Civic Hall =

Civic Hall may refer to:

- Civic Hall at Union Square, opened 2023 in NYC
- Leeds Civic Hall in Leeds, opened 1933
- Wolverhampton Civic Hall in Wolverhampton, opened 1938
- Galleywood Civic Hall in Wolverhampton
- Civic Hall in Ballarat, Victoria, opened in 1956
- Civic Hall in Port Lincoln, South Australia
- Portland Civic Hall in Portland, Victoria
- Rye Civic Hall in Rye, Victoria
- Ryde Civic Hall in Ryde, New South Wales
- "Civic Hall", a song on the album Magnets by The Vapors

== See also ==
- Civic Center
- Civic Center Historic District (disambiguation)
