= United States Post Office (Berkeley, California) =

United States historic post office

- U.S. Post Office
- U.S. National Register of Historic Places
- Berkeley Landmark
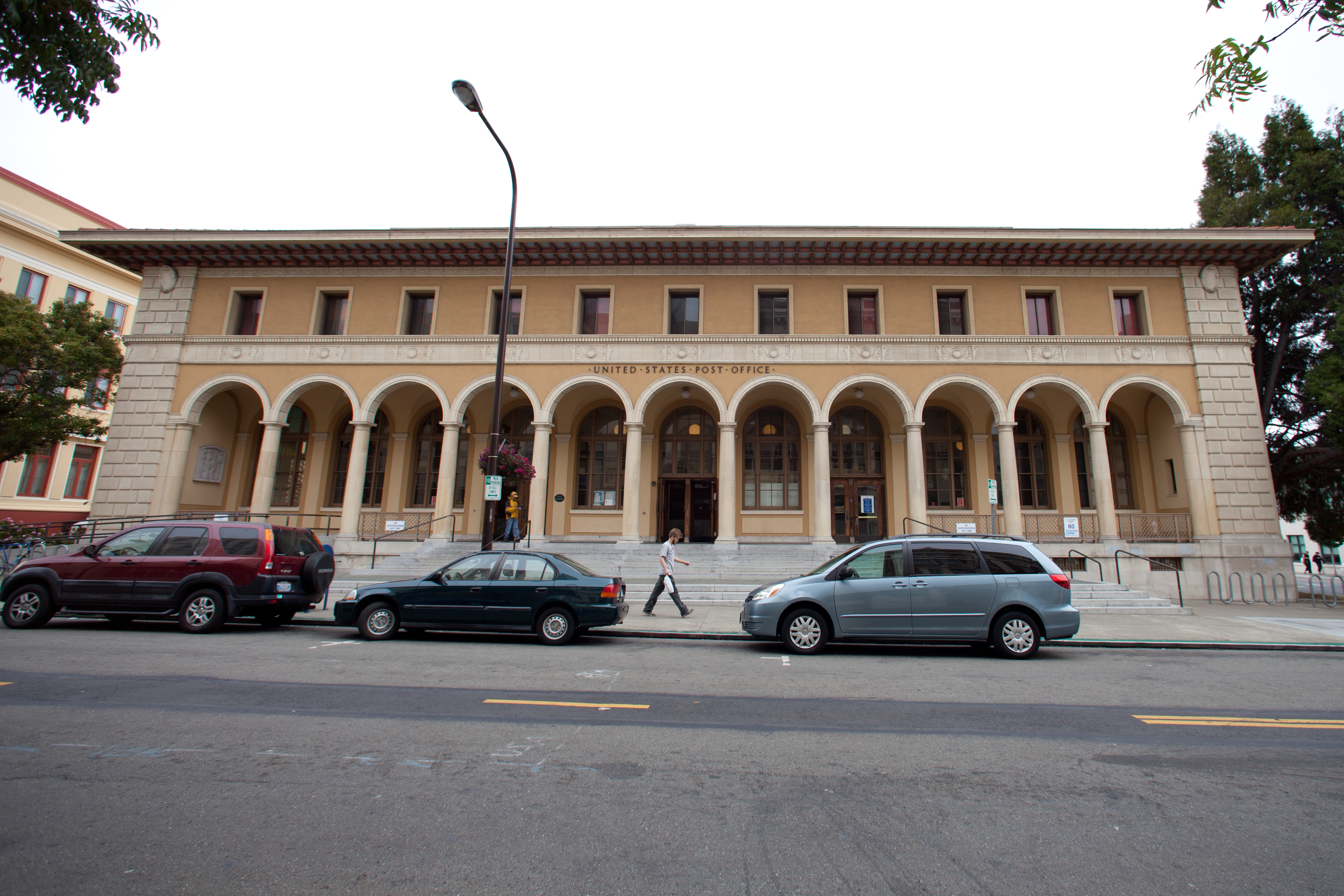

- Location within Oakland, California Location within California Location within the United States
- Coordinates: 37°52′8″N 122°16′13″W
- Built: 1914
- Built by: Van Sant-Houghton, Co.
- Architect: Oscar Wenderoth
- NRHP reference No.: 81000144
- BERKL No.: 38

Significant dates
- Added to NRHP: August 14, 1984
- Designated BERKL: June 16, 1980

The U.S. Post Office, also known as the Berkeley Main Post Office, is a local branch of the United States Postal Service. The building, located at 2000 Allston Way, (Note: Nomination form and other sources show address as 2000 Milvia Street.) Berkeley, California, was built in 1914–15. (Note: Contract was let in April 1914. Postal workers occupied building in September 1915.) The building has been described as a "free adaptation of Brunelleschi's Foundling Hospital." Designed in the Second Renaissance Revival style, the front of the building features terra cotta arches supported by plain tuscan columns. (Note: Second Renaissance Revival is often used to describe details common to 1910s post offices all over the country.)

The Post Office is within the Civic Center Historic District, a five block area listed on the National Register of Historic Places. (Note: Berkeley Historic Civic Center District listed December 3, 1998.) The district is a locally significant ensemble of harmoniously planned civic buildings that retains a high degree of integrity since achieving significance in 1950. The post office, along with the "Old" City Hall (1909) in the Beaux-Arts style, is among the earliest and the most decorative of the thirteen buildings in the district.

The architect is unknown but Oscar Wenderoth is listed on the cornerstone as he was director of the Office of the Supervising Architect that designed this and many other federal government buildings. The floor space doubled with the completion of the annex in 1932. A few years later, the Treasury Relief Art Project commissioned a sculpture and a mural for the lobby. Both are well-preserved examples of the styles, subjects and dominant themes of New Deal Art. The post office was designated Berkeley Landmark No. 38 on June 16, 1980, by the Landmarks Preservation Commission and added to the National Register of Historic Places on January 29, 1981.

== Proposed sale ==
Financial problems fueled by onerous Congressional legislation which introduced an unsustainable debt load without acknowledging revenue dynamics prompted a national sale of underused and often aging real estate owned by the USPS. Dozens of properties had been sold despite protests from local communities. The postal service issued a statement that "sales of historic postal properties have been very modest: 7 in 2012 and 6 in 2013." They identified 1,900 properties that are listed or could be considered for listing on the National Register of Historic Places out of 9,000 properties owned by USPS. In 2014, the USPS Office of Inspector General sought an independent review certain appraisals to ensure that they "were representative of the fair market value."

In 2013, the post office was listed for sale with a possible leaseback of the lobby to continue providing postal service. Opponents staged a 33-day encampment on its steps while the City Council unanimously voted to oppose the sale and unsuccessfully sought a one-year delay.

In November, 2014, postal officials announced a tentative sales agreement to a local developer. First They Came for the Homeless immediately established a 2nd occupation on the exterior grounds, the City of Berkeley filed a lawsuit against the sale, the seller withdrew, and in April 2015 federal district judge William Alsup dismissed the case on the basis of the Postal Service's declaration that no sale was pending. The 2nd occupation lasted until April, 12th, 2016 at which time Postal Police cleared the protest.

Images and art of the Berkeley Post Office
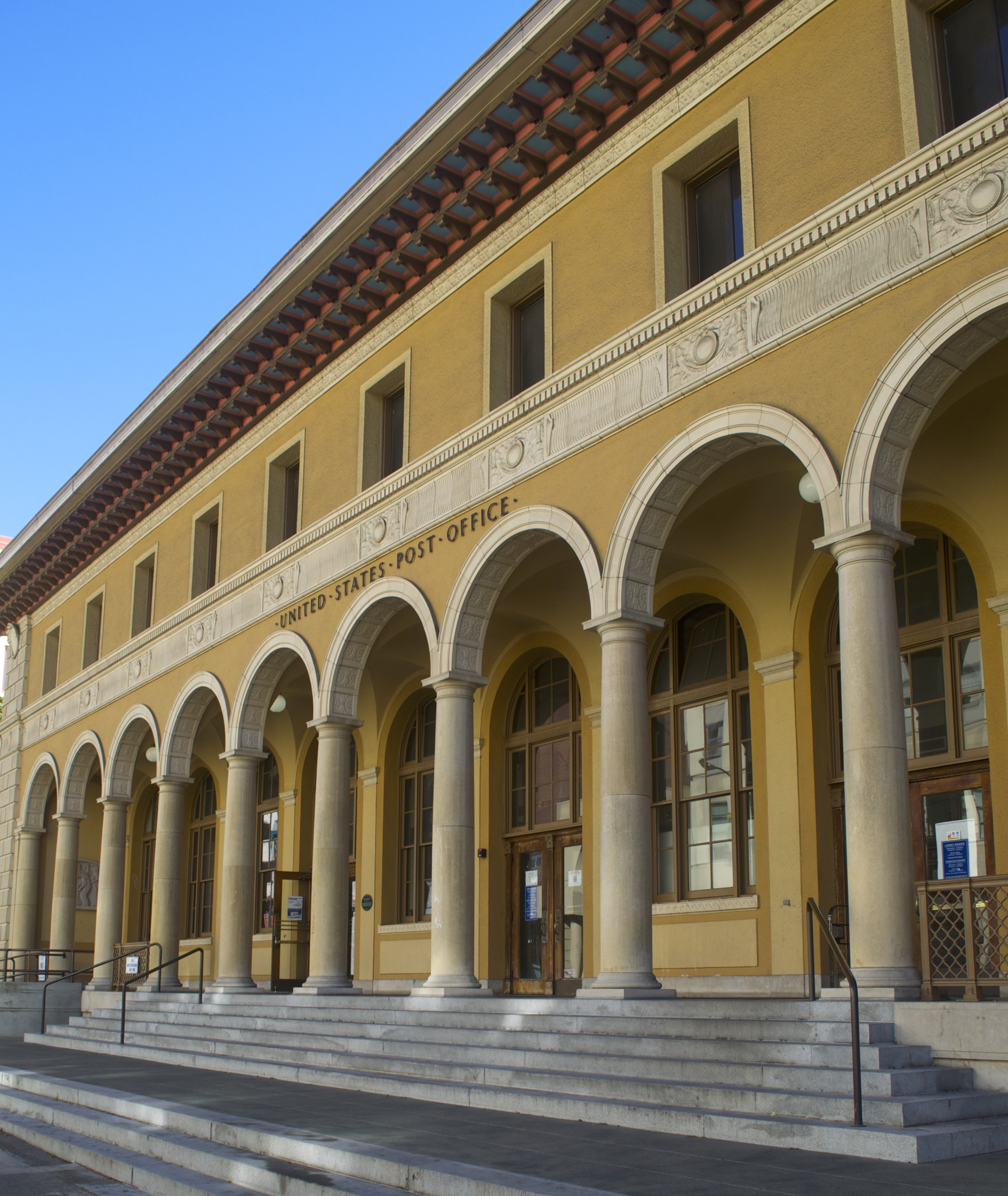
Exterior of the Post Office

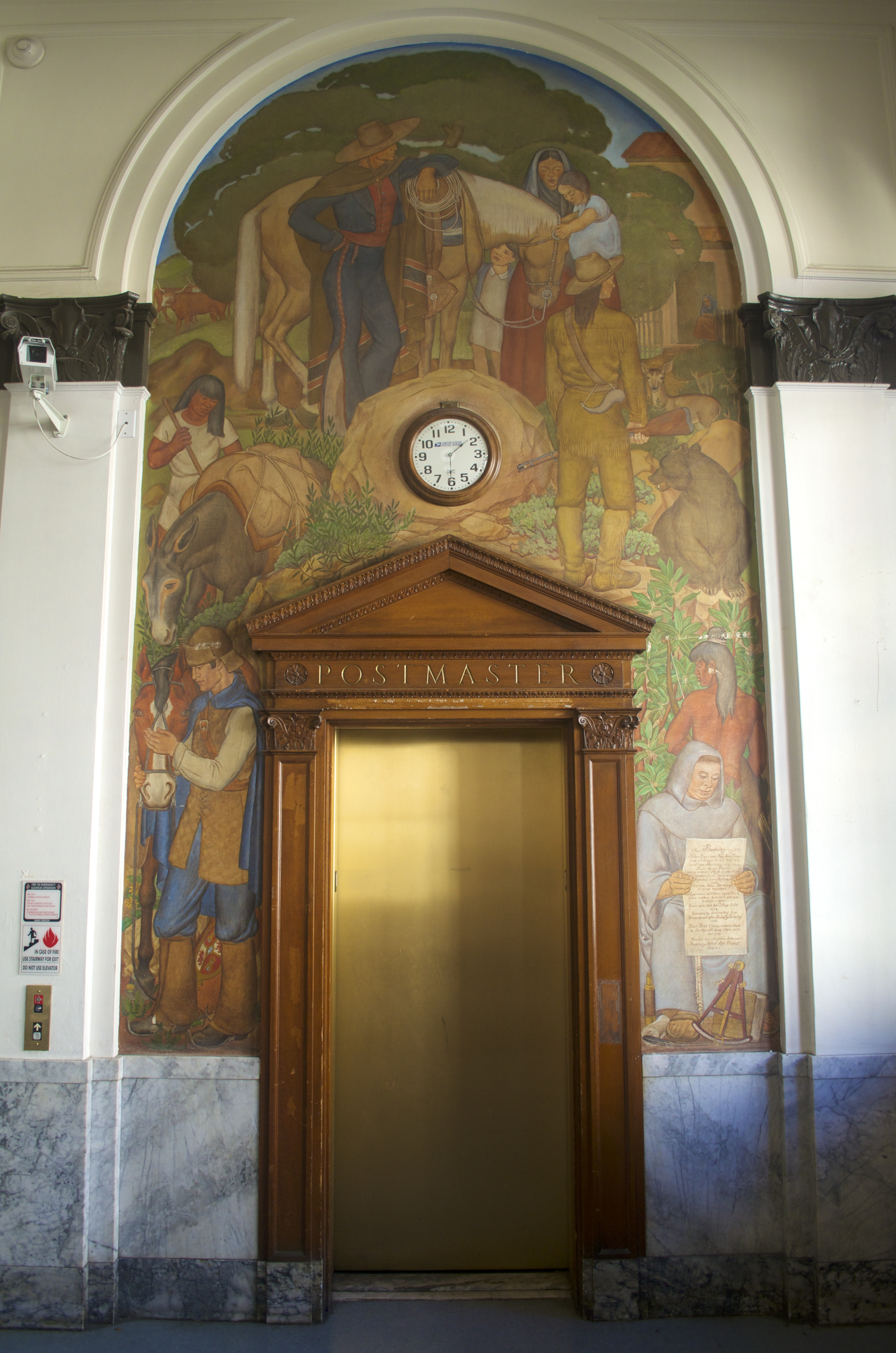
Mural, Incidents in California History (1937) by Suzanne Scheuer and wood work surrounding the elevator.

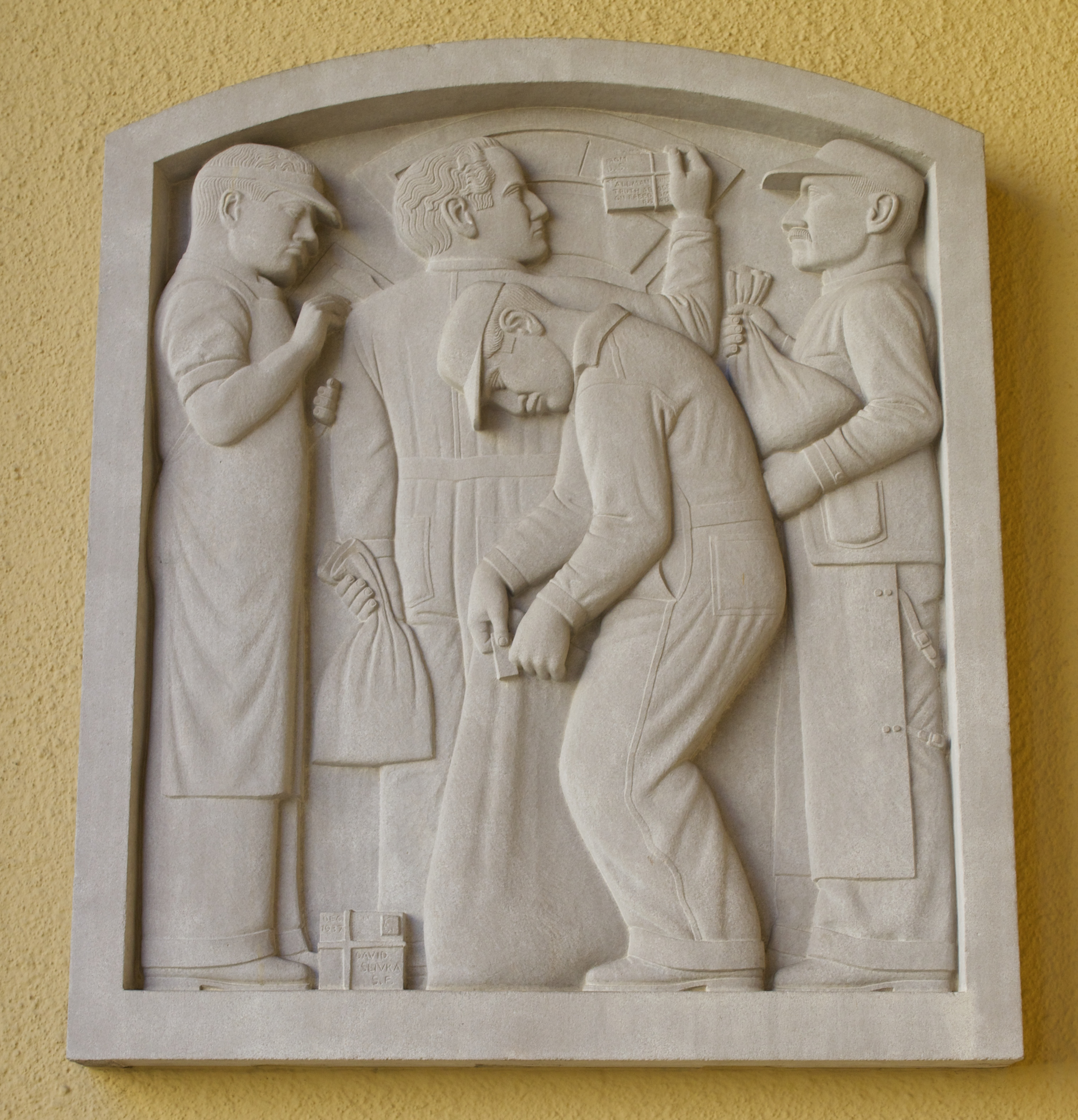
Sculpture on east side of main entrance. Signed: David Slivka, 1937

== Description ==
The Berkeley Post Office occupies half a city block, and is structurally composed of reinforced concrete. The exterior is covered in Bedford limestone up to the water table line, above which the walls are covered in cement stucco with terra cotta trimmings. The main entrance loggia is supported by Kasota marble columns. The Allston Way facade features an arcade of 11 high round arches on plain Tuscan columns. The hipped roof is covered in red tile over wood sheathing, with a wide overhang. On the east end wall is a relief sculpture of postal workers by David Slivka, dated December 1937, with the inscription "From U.S., To All Mankind, Truth Abode, On Freedom Road.".

== See also ==
- List of United States post offices
- List of United States post office murals
- List of New Deal sculpture
