= Berkeley Historic Civic Center District =

Historic district in California, US

- U.S. National Register of Historic Places
- U.S. Historic district
- Berkeley Landmark
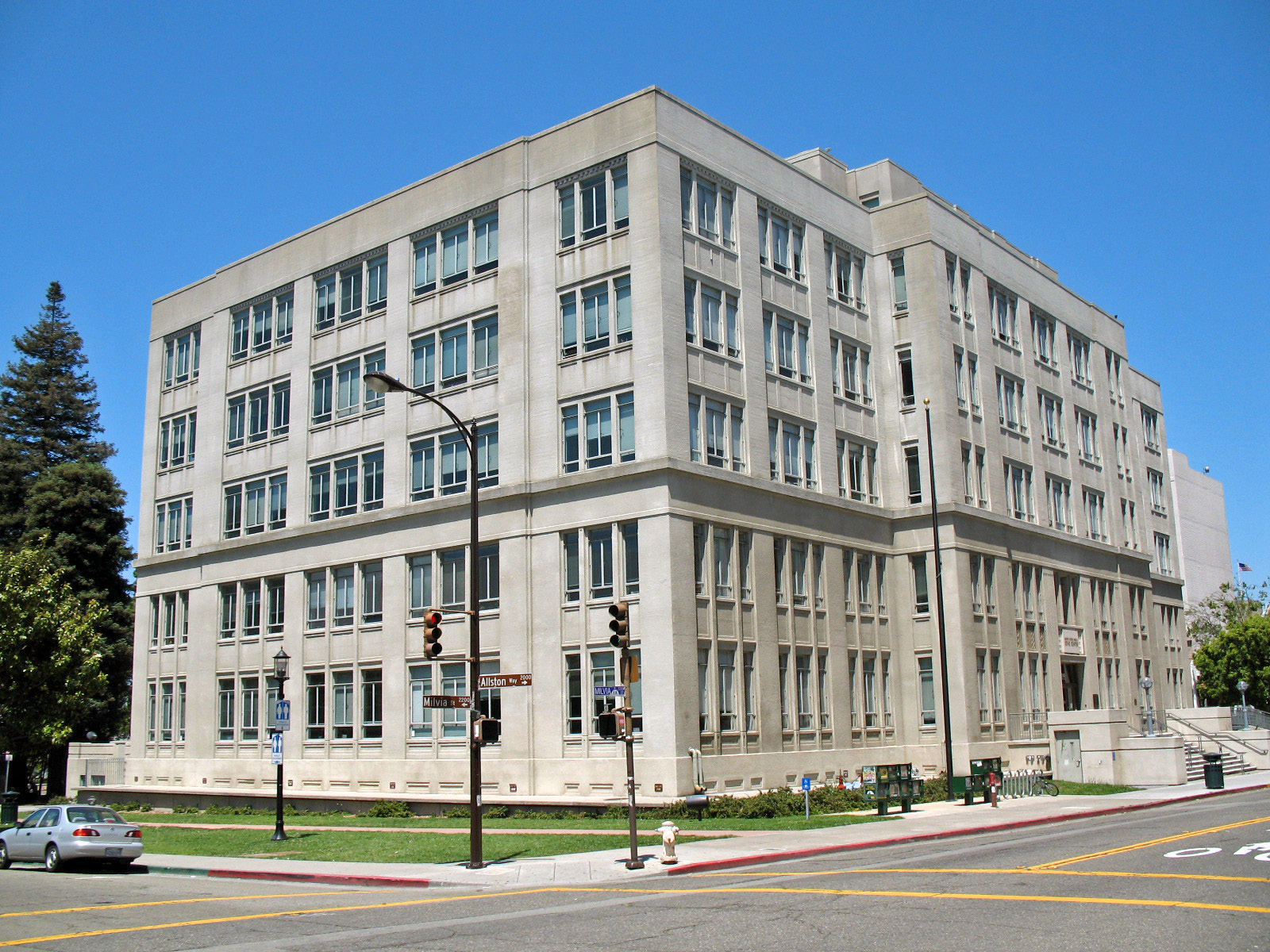
- Martin Luther King Jr. Civic Center Building (also known as the Federal Land Bank)

- Location within Oakland, California Location within California
- Location: roughly bounded by McKinney Ave., Addison St., Shattuck Ave., and Kittredge St. Berkeley, California, U.S.
- Coordinates: 37°52′10″N 122°16′13″W
- Area: 9.9 acres (4.0 ha)
- NRHP reference No.: 98000963
- BERKL No.: 212

Significant dates
- Added to NRHP: December 3, 1998
- Designated BERKL: December 7, 1998

The Berkeley Historic Civic Center District is a 9.9-acre (4.0 ha) historic district in Berkeley, California, U.S. It comprises portions of a five-block area surrounding Martin Luther King Jr. Civic Center Park, primarily made up of civic-related buildings. It has been listed as one of the National Register of Historic Places since December 3, 1998; and listed as a Berkeley Landmark by the City of Berkeley since December 7, 1998.

== History ==
There are thirteen buildings in the district, and it contains nine contributing buildings, one contributing site, and one contributing structure. There are four noncontributing buildings. Berkeley's Civic Center area is bordered by the downtown commercial and retail district on the east and north, and bordered by residential neighborhoods to the west and south.

In 2022, city officials launched a public process that aimed to gather community input on the revitalization of Berkeley's Martin Luther King Jr. Civic Center Park.

== Notable buildings, sites, and structures ==
- City Hall (now known as Old Berkeley City Hall, or Maudelle Shirek Building) (1909), 2134 Martin Luther King Jr. Way, Berkeley, California; designed by architects John Bakewell and Arthur Brown Jr.
- Berkeley Civic Center Park (now known as Martin Luther King Jr. Civic Center Park) (1938–1942), 2100 block of Martin Luther King Jr. Way, Berkeley, California
- Veterans’ Memorial Building (1928), 1931 Center Street, Berkeley, California
- Federal Land Bank (also known as the Martin Luther King Jr. Civic Center Building) (1938), 2180 Milvia Street, Berkeley, California
- Berkeley Community Theater (1950), on the campus of Berkeley High School, Berkeley, California
- Downtown YMCA (1910), 2001 Allston Way, Berkeley, California
- United States Post Office (1914), 2000 Allston Way, Berkeley, California
- State Farm Insurance Companies Building (1947–1948), 1947 Center Street, Berkeley, California
- City Hall Annex (1925), 1835 Allston Way, Berkeley, California
- Hall of Justice (1938–1939), 2171 McKinley Street, Berkeley, California
Berkeley Historic Civic Center District

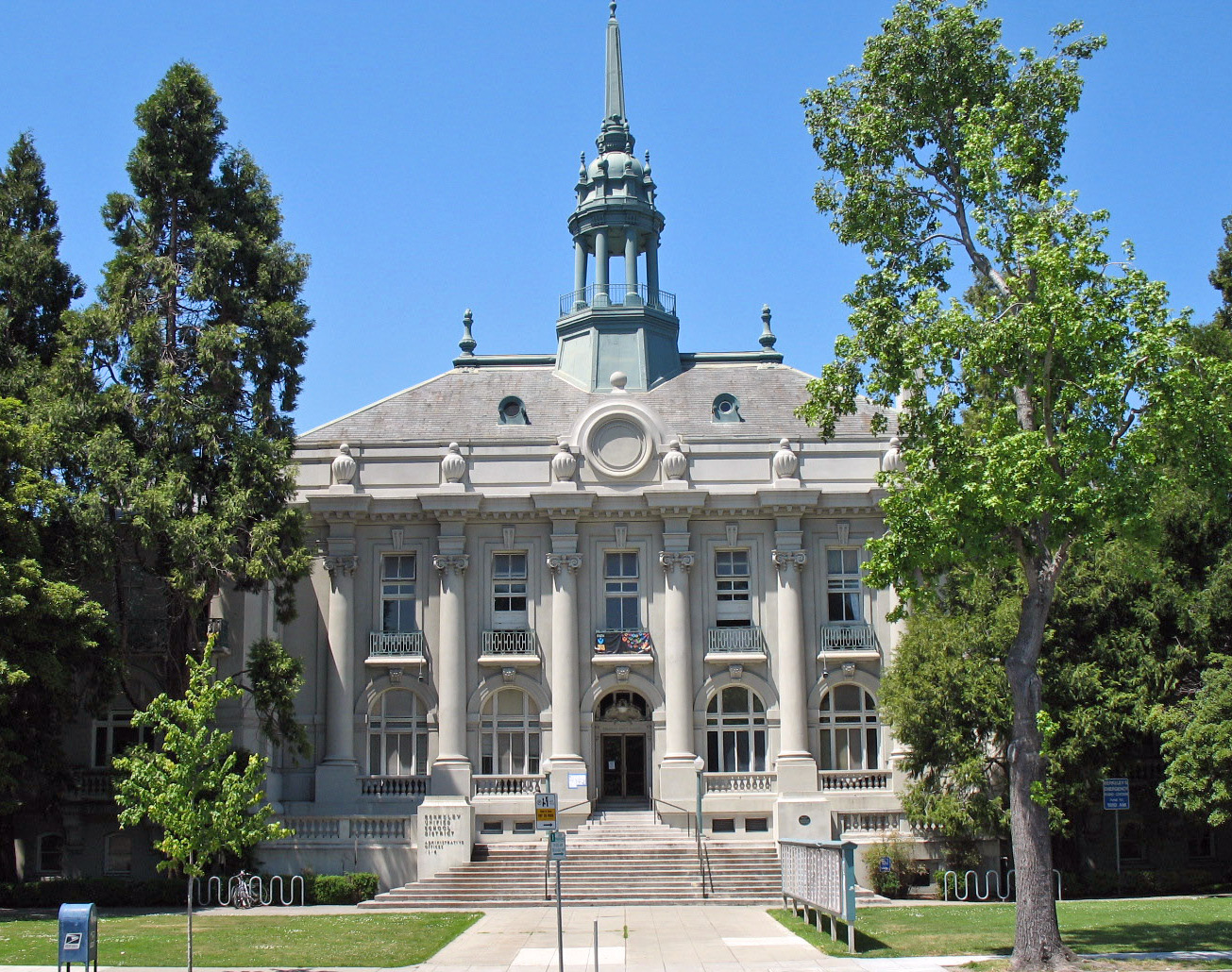
Old Berkeley City Hall (1909)

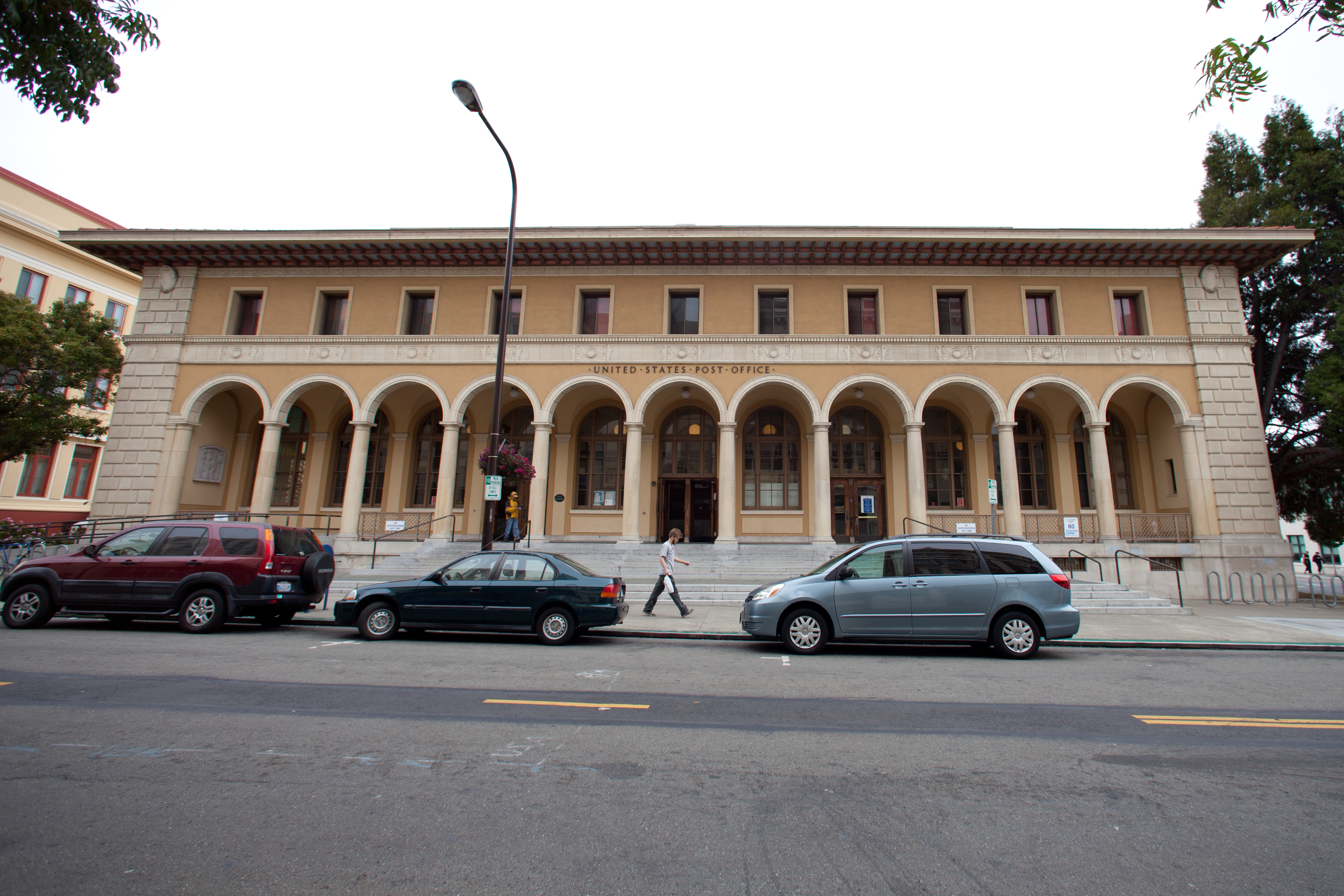
United States Post Office in Berkeley (1914)

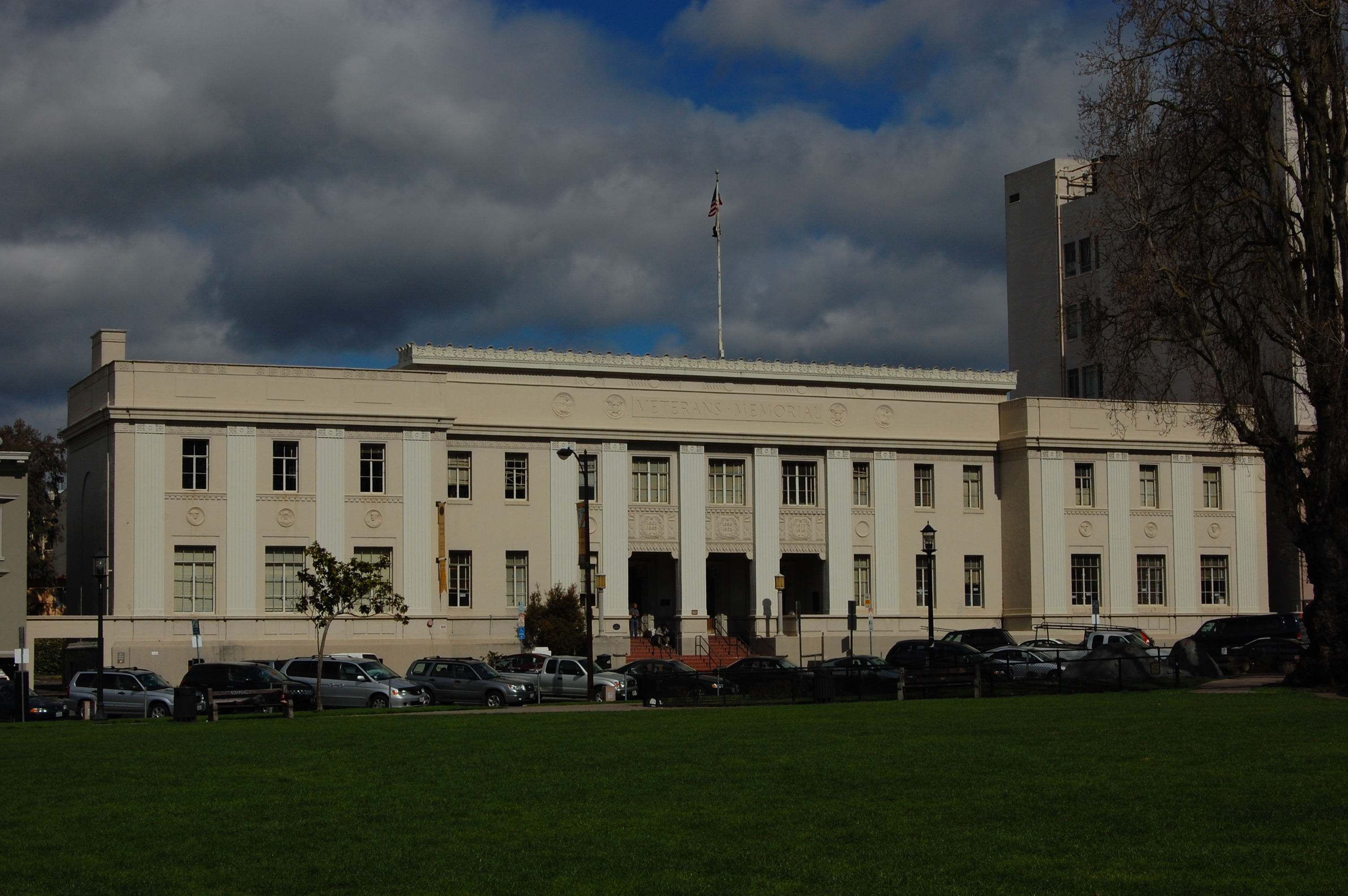
Veterans’ Memorial Building (1928)

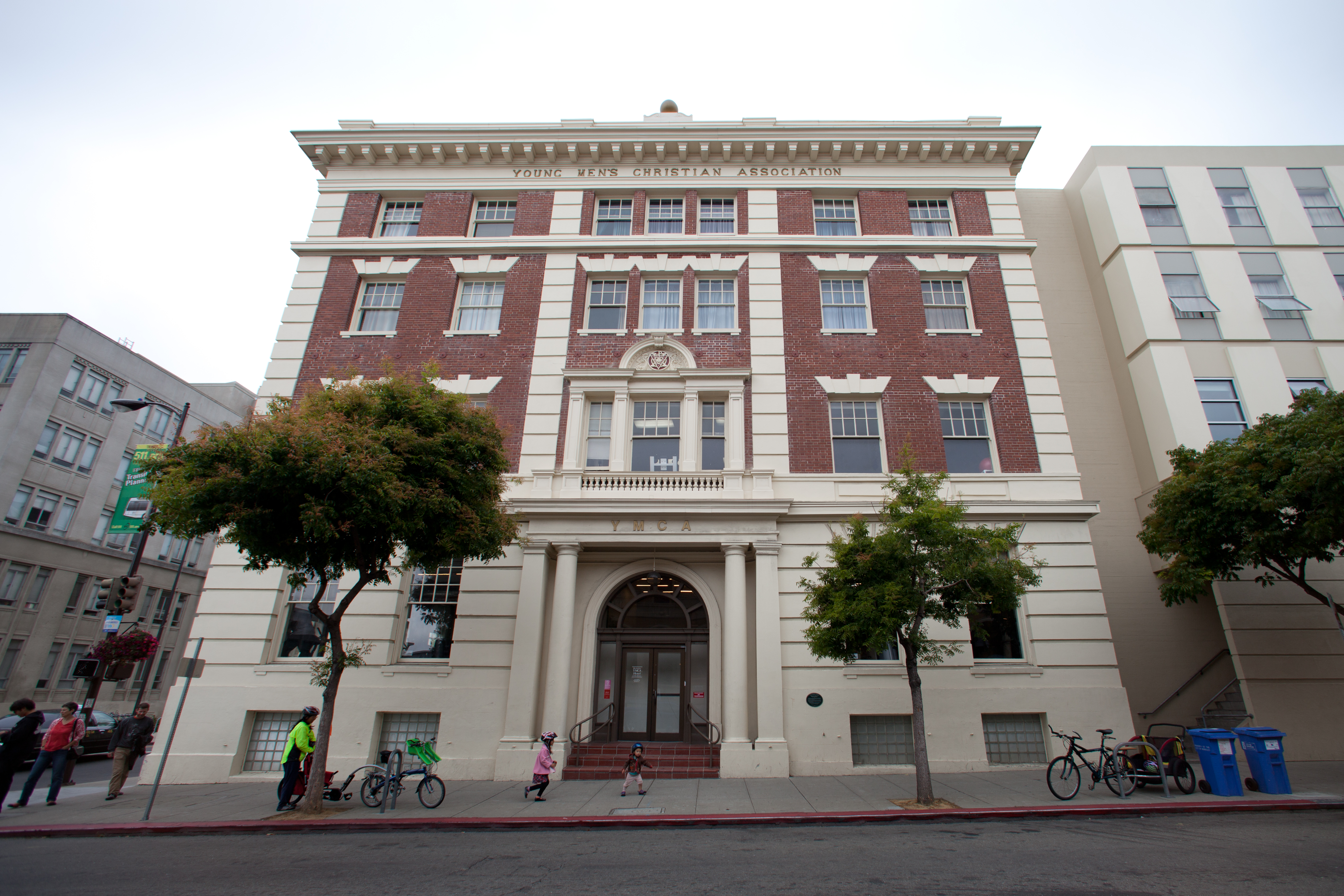
Downtown YMCA (1910)

== See also ==
- National Register of Historic Places listings in Alameda County, California
- List of Berkeley Landmarks in Berkeley, California
