= St. Augustine Civic Center =

- U.S. National Register of Historic Places
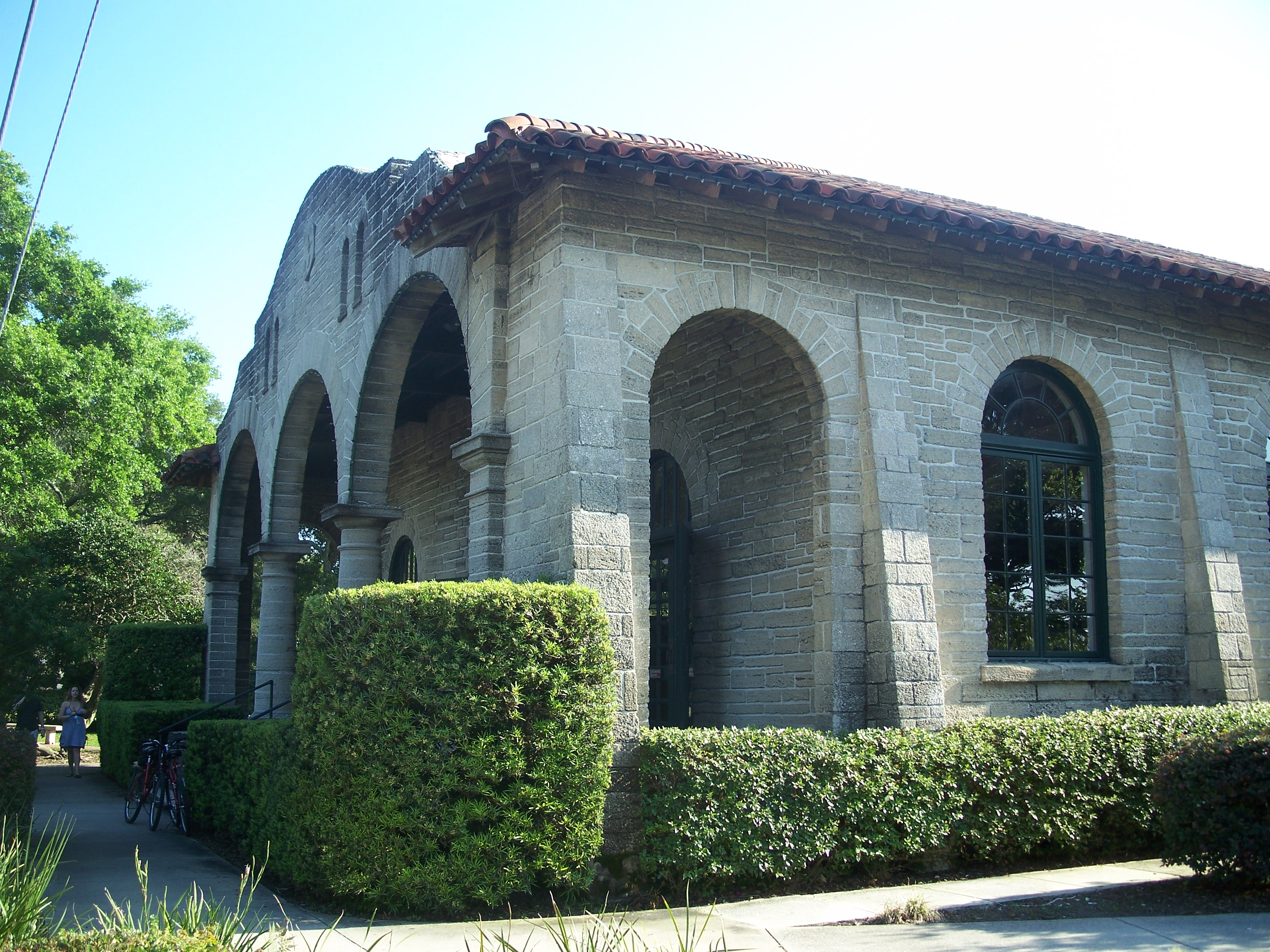
- Location: St. Augustine, Florida
- Coordinates: 29°53′55″N 81°18′53″W
- Built: 1935
- Architect: Frederick Henderich
- Architectural style: Mission Revival architecture
- NRHP reference No.: 05000316
- Added to NRHP: April 21, 2005

The St. Augustine Civic Center (also known as the Visitor's Information Center) is a historic site in St. Augustine, Florida. It is located at 10 Castillo Drive. On April 21, 2005, it was added to the U.S. National Register of Historic Places.

Though the given address is at 10 Castillo Drive, the actual location is on the southwest corner of West Castillo Drive and South Castillo Drive, the latter of which is part of an overlap of US Business Route 1 and Florida State Road A1A. The Civic Center is next door to the St. Augustine Huguenot Cemetery, and contains a mile-marker for the eastern terminus of the Old Spanish Trail. An intermodal parking garage can be found behind the civic center with a bus loop along West Castillo Drive, and another one extending north from the intersection of Orange Street and Cordova Street.

== Gallery ==
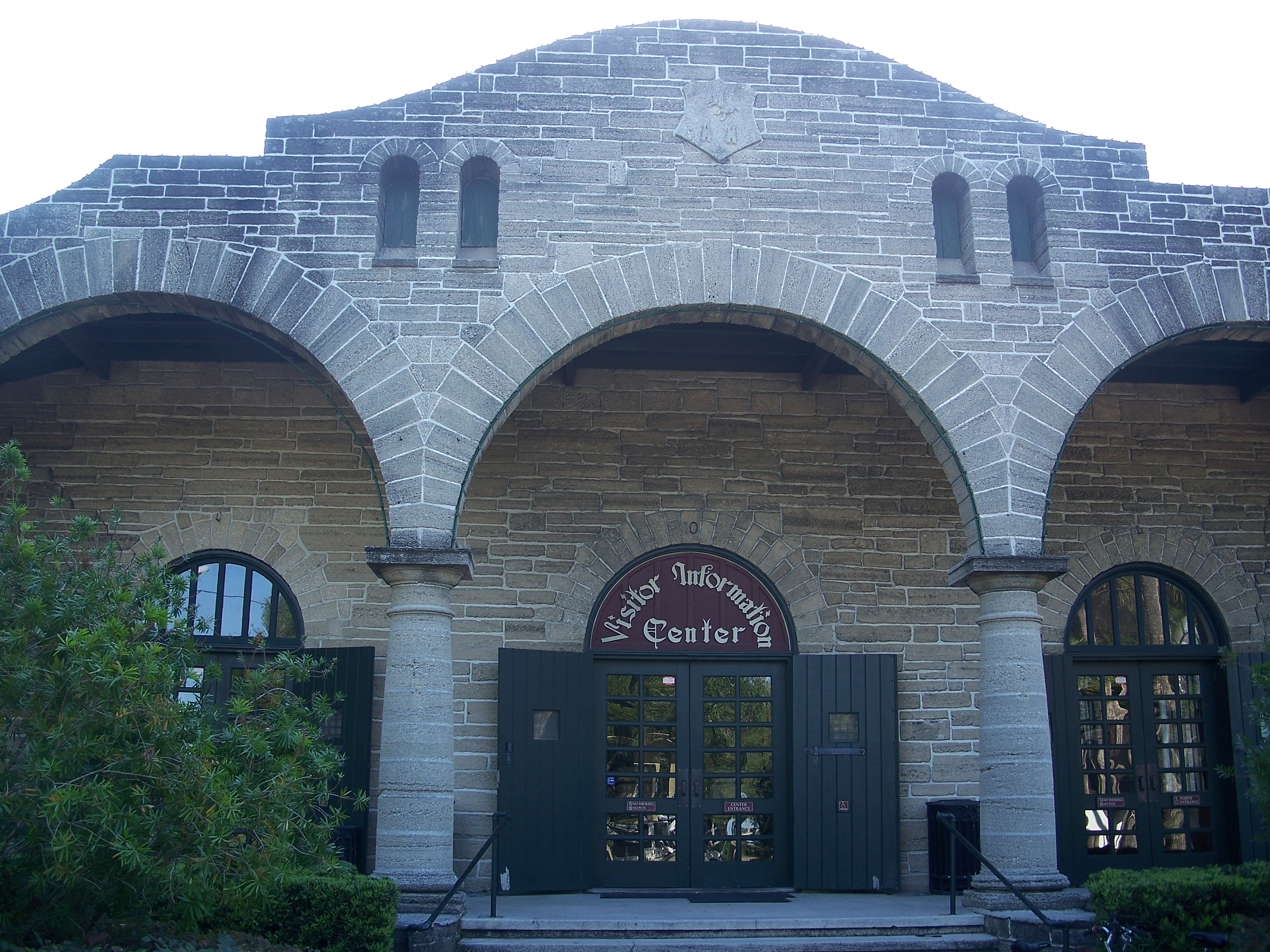

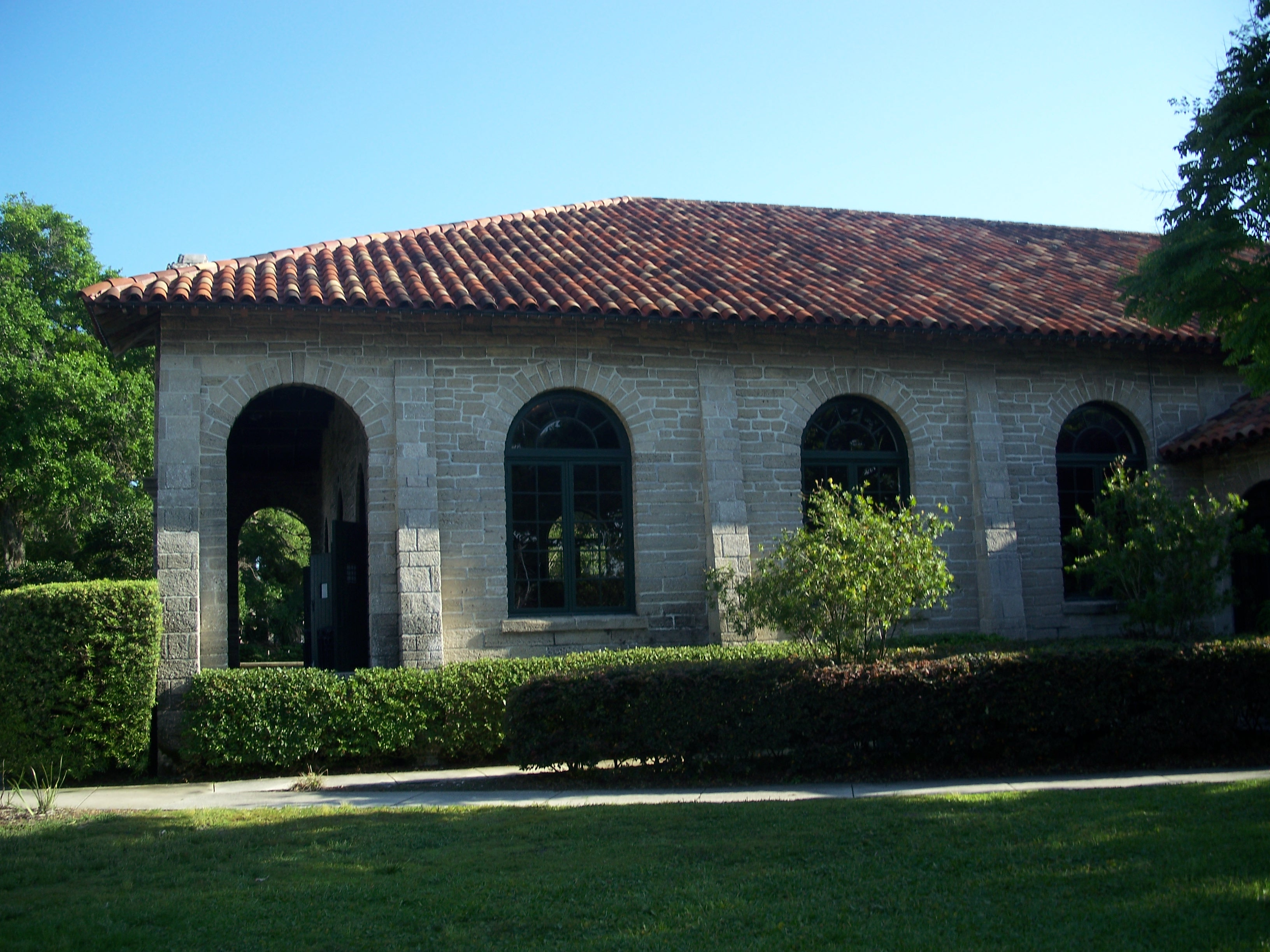

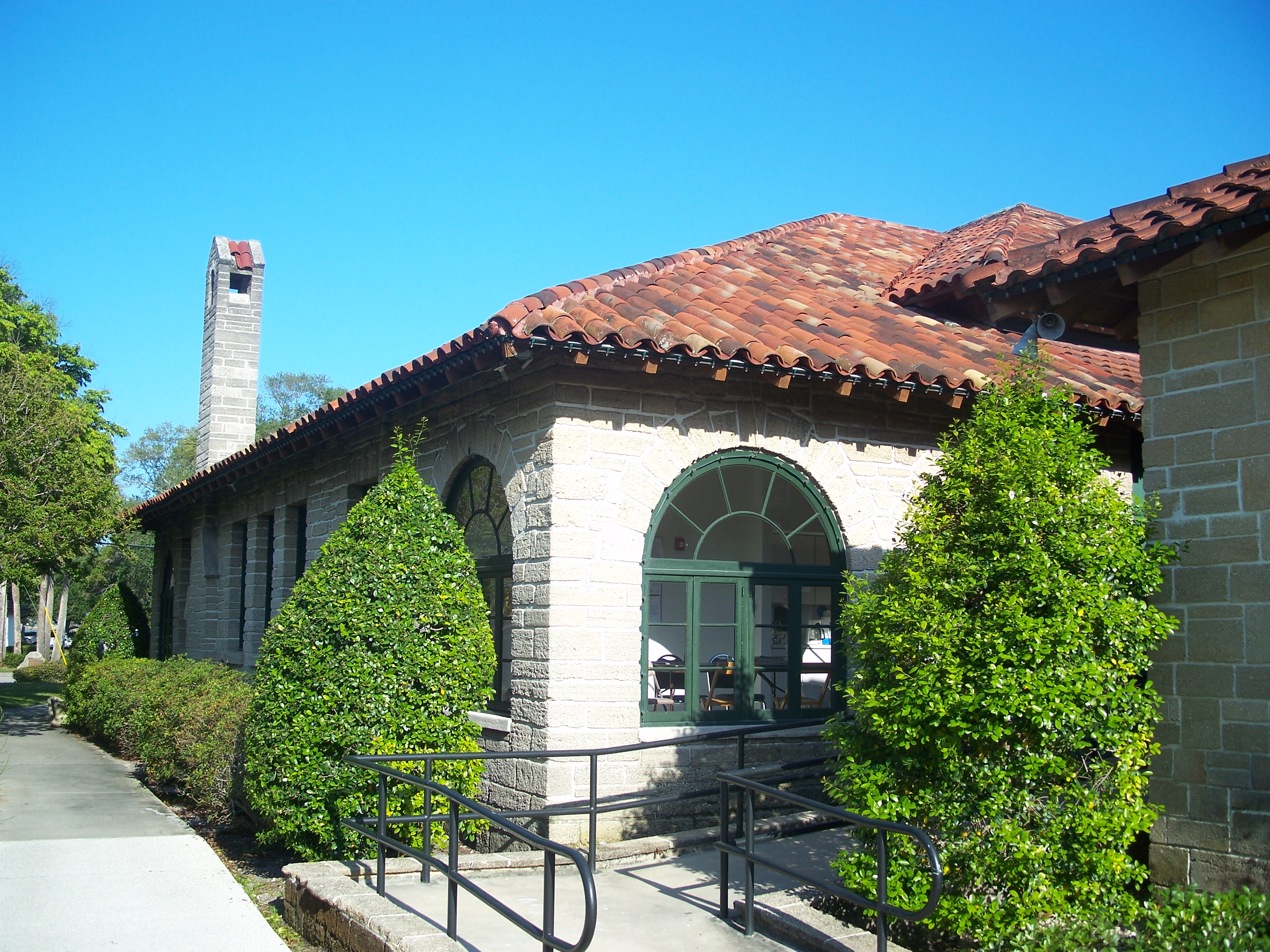

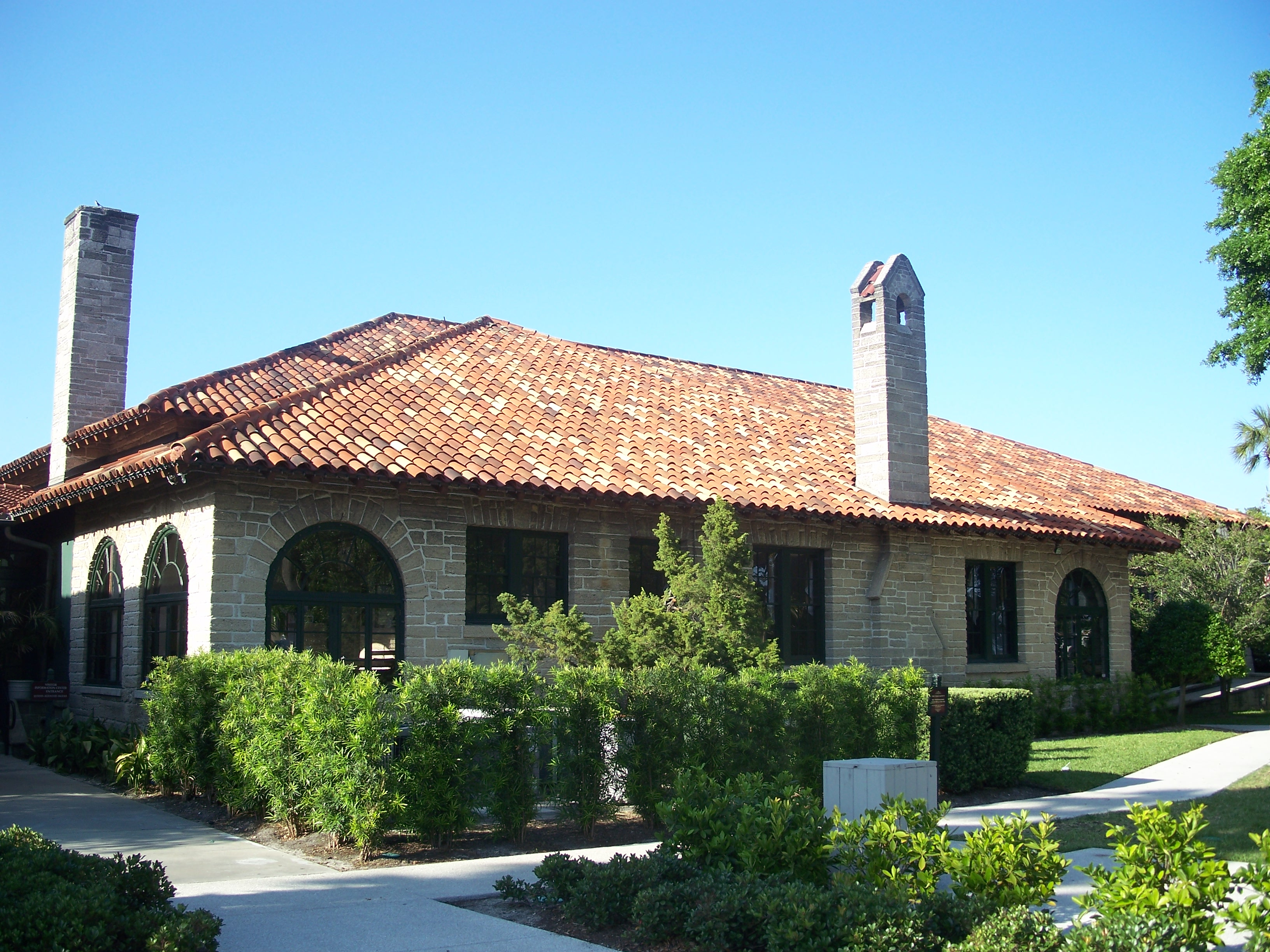
