= John Bakewell Jr. =

American architect (1872–1963)

- Born: August 28, 1872; Topeka, Kansas, U.S.
- Died: February 19, 1963; San Francisco, California, U.S.
- Education: University of California, Berkeley, École des Beaux-Arts
- Occupation: Architect
- Practice: Bakewell and Brown (1905–1927); Bakewell and Weihe (1927–1941)

John Bakewell Jr. (1872–1963) was an American architect, based in San Francisco, California, U.S.

== Biography ==
John Bakewell Jr. was born on August 28, 1872, in Topeka, Kansas, U.S. He studied architecture at University of California, Berkeley, and École des Beaux-Arts in Paris. Arthur Brown Jr. had been his classmate in at École des Beaux-Arts.

Working with Arthur Brown Jr., in 1905 they formed the architectural firm of Bakewell and Brown, which designed many San Francisco Bay Area landmarks. Following the dissolution of Bakewell and Brown in 1927, Bakewell formed the new partnership of Bakewell and Weihe with longtime employee Ernest Weihe.

== List of work ==
- Arequipa Sanatorium, Fairfax, CA, 1911
- California School of Fine Arts, San Francisco, CA, 1926–1928
- San Francisco City Hall, San Francisco, CA, 1912–1915
- Old Berkeley City Hall, now the Maudelle Shirek Building, Berkeley, CA, 1908–1909
- Pasadena City Hall, Pasadena, CA, 1925–1927
- St. Mark's Episcopal Cathedral, Seattle, Capitol Hill, Seattle, WA, 1926–1930. Incompletely constructed.
- Golden Gate International Exposition, French Indo-Chinese Pavilion, San Francisco, CA, 1937–1939. Demolished 1939.
- Pacific Gas and Electric Company (PG & E), Headquarters Building, San Francisco, CA, 1924–1926
- Panama–Pacific International Exposition, Palace of Horticulture, San Francisco, CA, 1913–1915
- Regents of the University of California Office Building, South of Market, San Francisco, CA, 1910–1911. Demolished 1983.
- Sacramento Valley Irrigation Company, Offices, 1910
- San Francisco Housing Authority, Potrero Terrace Housing Development, San Francisco, CA, 1941–1942
- San Francisco War Memorial and Performing Arts Center, War Memorial Veterans' Building, San Francisco, CA, 1922–1932
- John D. Sloat Monument, Monterey, CA, 1907
- At Stanford University:
  - John Henry Meyer House, Menlo Park, CA, 1920. Now used as the Stanford Provost's residence.
  - Branner Hall, 1922-1923
  - Encina Commons, 1923
  - Encina Gymnasium, 1915
  - Cecil H. Green Library, 1919
  - Hoover Institution of War, Revolution, and Peace, Hoover Tower, 1940–1941
  - Stanford Memorial Auditorium, 1937
  - Stanford Stadium, 1921
  - "Old Union" student union, 1915
  - Toyon Hall, 1922-1923
- Temple Emanu-El, San Francisco, CA, 1926
- 50 United Nations Plaza Federal Office Building (San Francisco), San Francisco, CA, 1936
- W.C. Van Antwerp House ("Danvers House"), Burlingame, CA
