= Old Berkeley City Hall =

Historic building in Berkeley, California

- City Hall
- U.S. National Register of Historic Places
- Berkeley Landmark
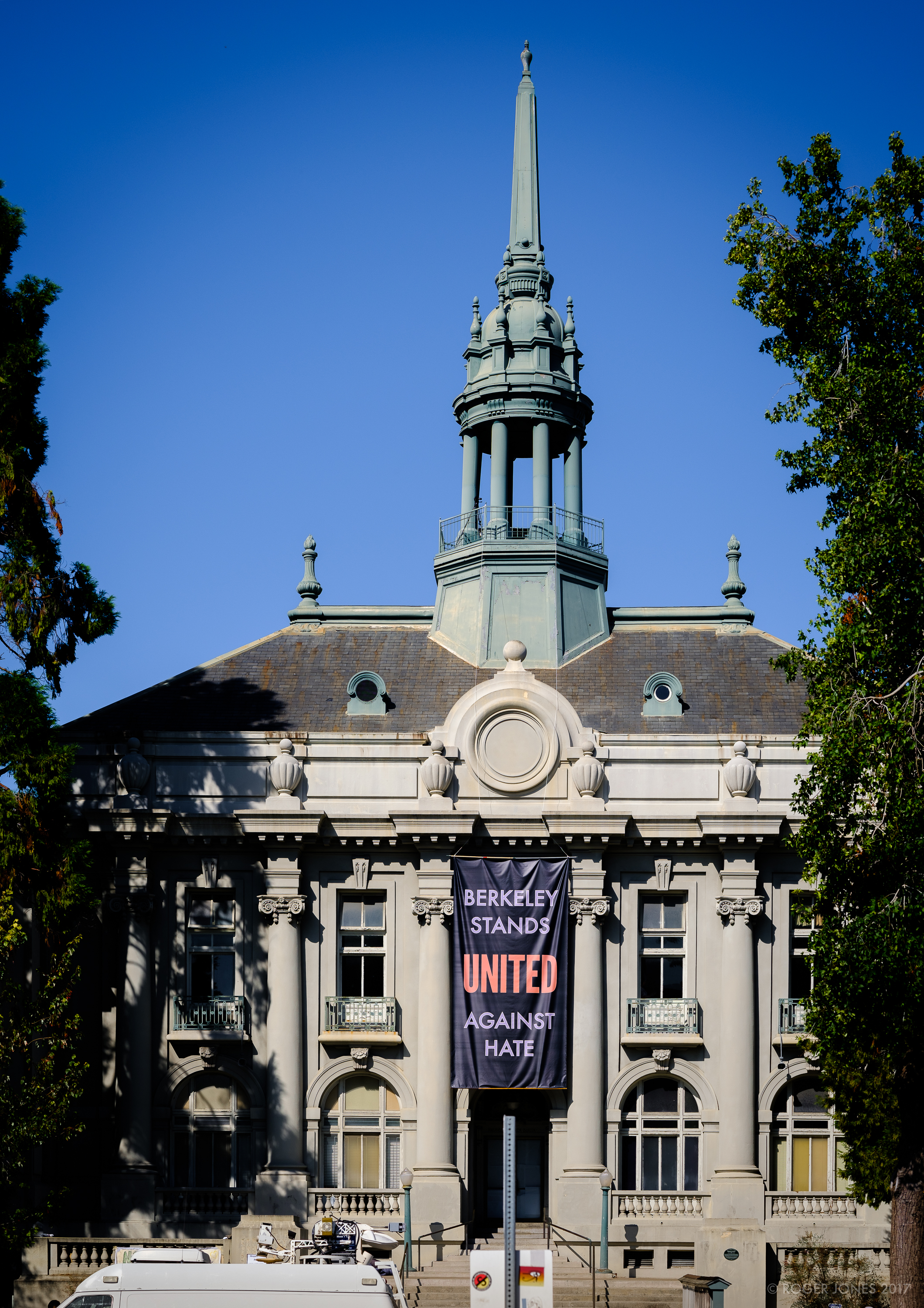

- Location within Oakland, California Location within California
- Location: 2134 Martin Luther King Jr. Way, Berkeley, California, U.S.
- Coordinates: 37.8691°N 122.2733°W
- Area: 0.4 acres (0.16 ha)
- Built: 1907
- Architects: John Bakewell Jr., Arthur Brown Jr.
- Architectural style: Beaux-Arts
- NRHP reference No.: 81000142
- BERKL No.: 1

Significant dates
- Added to NRHP: September 11, 1981
- Designated BERKL: December 15, 1975

Old Berkeley City Hall, also known as the Maudelle Shirek Building, is a historic building in the Civic Center neighborhood of Berkeley, California, U.S.. It was originally located at 2134 Grove Street (now 2134 Martin Luther King Jr. Way). It has been listed in the National Register of Historic Places under the name "City Hall" since September 11, 1981; and listed as a Berkeley Landmark by the city since December 15, 1975. It is one of the contributing buildings to the Berkeley Historic Civic Center District.

== History ==
The design of the Berkeley City Hall was derived from the Town Hall at Tours, France, designed by Victor Laloux. The building design by architects John Bakewell Jr., and Arthur Brown Jr. for the old city hall was selected as the winner of a 1907 competition to replace the original Town Hall, which had burned to the ground in 1904 (designed by Samuel and Joseph Cather Newsom, 1884). A few years later in 1915, the same two architects designed San Francisco City Hall, which has similar features. The Old City Hall is the keystone of the Berkeley Civic Center, which was inspired by the concepts of the City Beautiful movement, emphasizing broad vistas and important public buildings grouped around a central open space or park.

In 1977, the city offices were moved to 2180 Milvia Street, which resulted in the name "old city hall". The fate of the old city hall building has been in limbo since 2002, when Berkeley voters rejected a bond to repair it. In 2007, the name of the building was changed to the Maudelle Shirek Building after former Vice Mayor and eight-term City Council member Maudelle Shirek.

== See also ==
- List of Berkeley Landmarks in Berkeley, California
- National Register of Historic Places listings in Alameda County, California
