= Civic Center station =

Civic Center station may refer to:

United States

- Civic Center station (MARTA), in Atlanta, Georgia
- Civic Center station (MetroLink), in St. Louis, Missouri
- Civic Center station (Metrorail), in Miami, Florida
- Civic Center station (San Diego Trolley), in San Diego, California
- Civic Center station (VTA) in San Jose, California
- Civic Center/Grand Park station, in Los Angeles, California
- Civic Center/UN Plaza station, in San Francisco, California
- East LA Civic Center station, in East Los Angeles, California
- Kaʻākaukukui station, also known as Civic Center station, in Honolulu, Hawaiʻi

China

- Civic Center station (Dongguan Rail Transit), in Dongguan, Guangdong
- Civic Center station (Nanchang Metro), in Nanchang, Jiangxi
- Civic Center station (Shenzhen Metro), in Shenzhen, Guangdong
- Civic Center station (Wuxi Metro), in Wuxi, Jiangsu
- Civic Center station (Zhengzhou Metro), in Zhengzhou, Henan

Thailand

- Nonthaburi Civic Center MRT station, in Nonthaburi Province

== See also ==
- Citizen Center station
