= Līhuʻe Civic Center Historic District =

Historic district in Hawaii, United States

- U.S. National Register of Historic Places
- U.S. Historic district
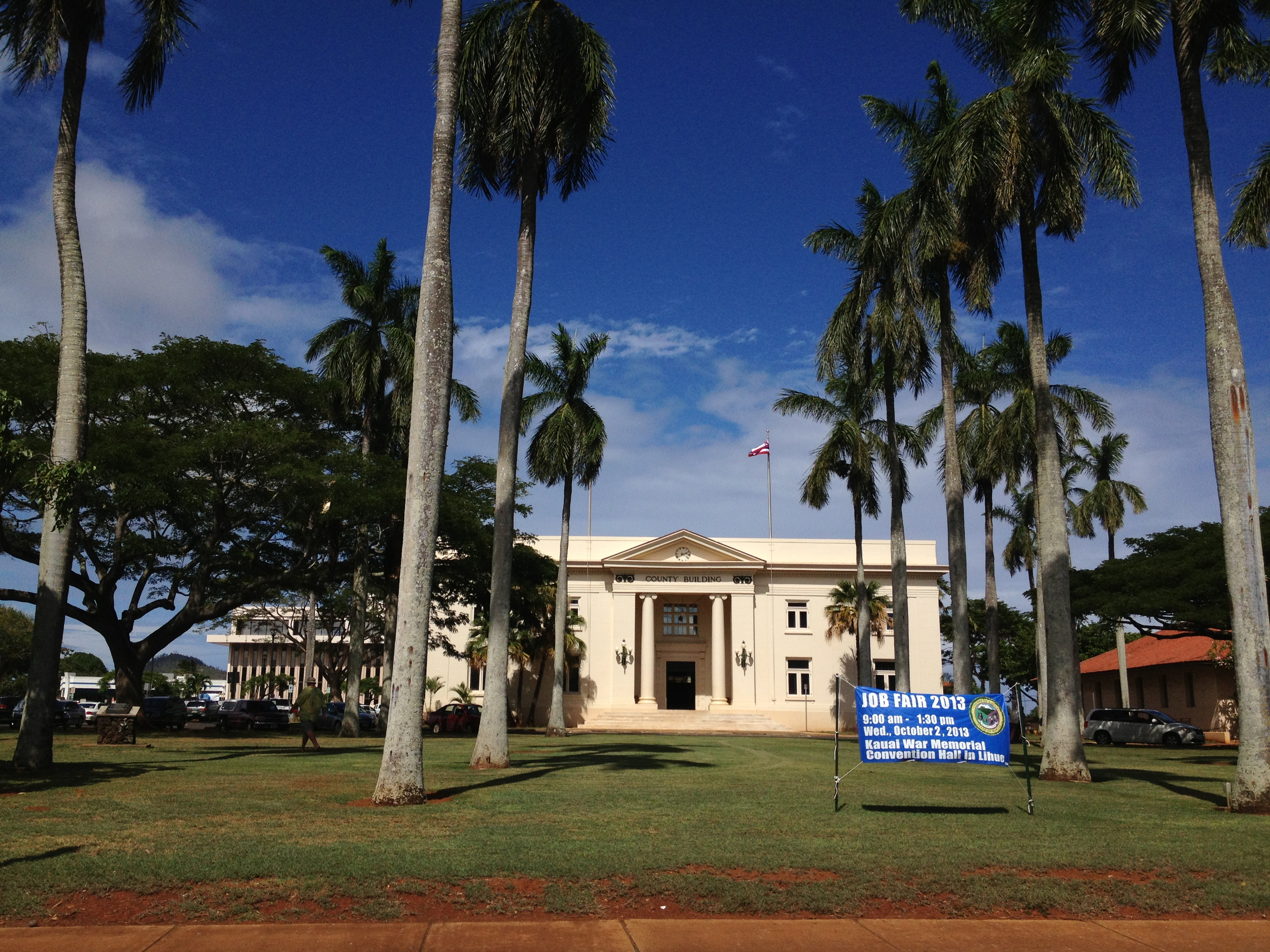
- County Building

- Location within Hawaii
- Location: Off Hawaii Route 50, Līhuʻe, Hawaii
- Coordinates: 21°58′47″N 159°22′11″W
- Area: 5 acres (2.0 ha)
- Built: 1913
- Architect: Hart Wood, others
- Architectural style: Classical Revival, Mission/spanish Revival
- NRHP reference No.: 81000204
- Added to NRHP: December 17, 1981

The Līhuʻe Civic Center Historic District, in Līhuʻe, Kauaʻi, Hawaii, is a 5-acre (2.0 ha) historic district that was listed on the National Register of Historic Places in 1981. It includes Classical Revival and Mission/spanish Revival architecture in structures dating back as far as 1913. The Kauaʻi County Courthouse, the County Building (1913), and the County Building Annex are the three contributing buildings in the district, and its one contributing site is a park; all are within one city block in the center of downtown Līhuʻe.

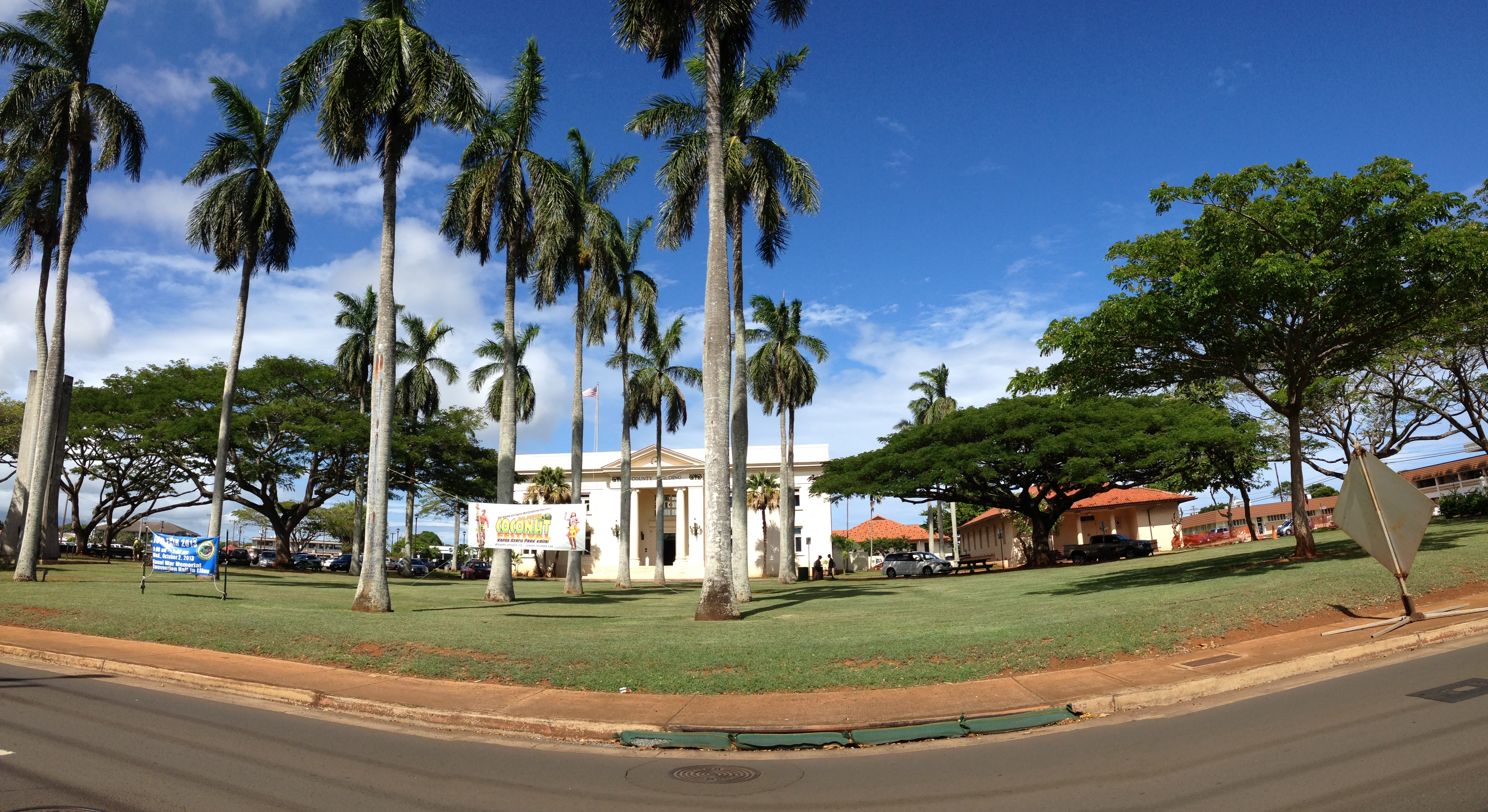
A panorama of the County Building and park
