= Griswold Civic Center Historic District =

Historic district in Michigan, United States

- U.S. National Register of Historic Places
- U.S. Historic district
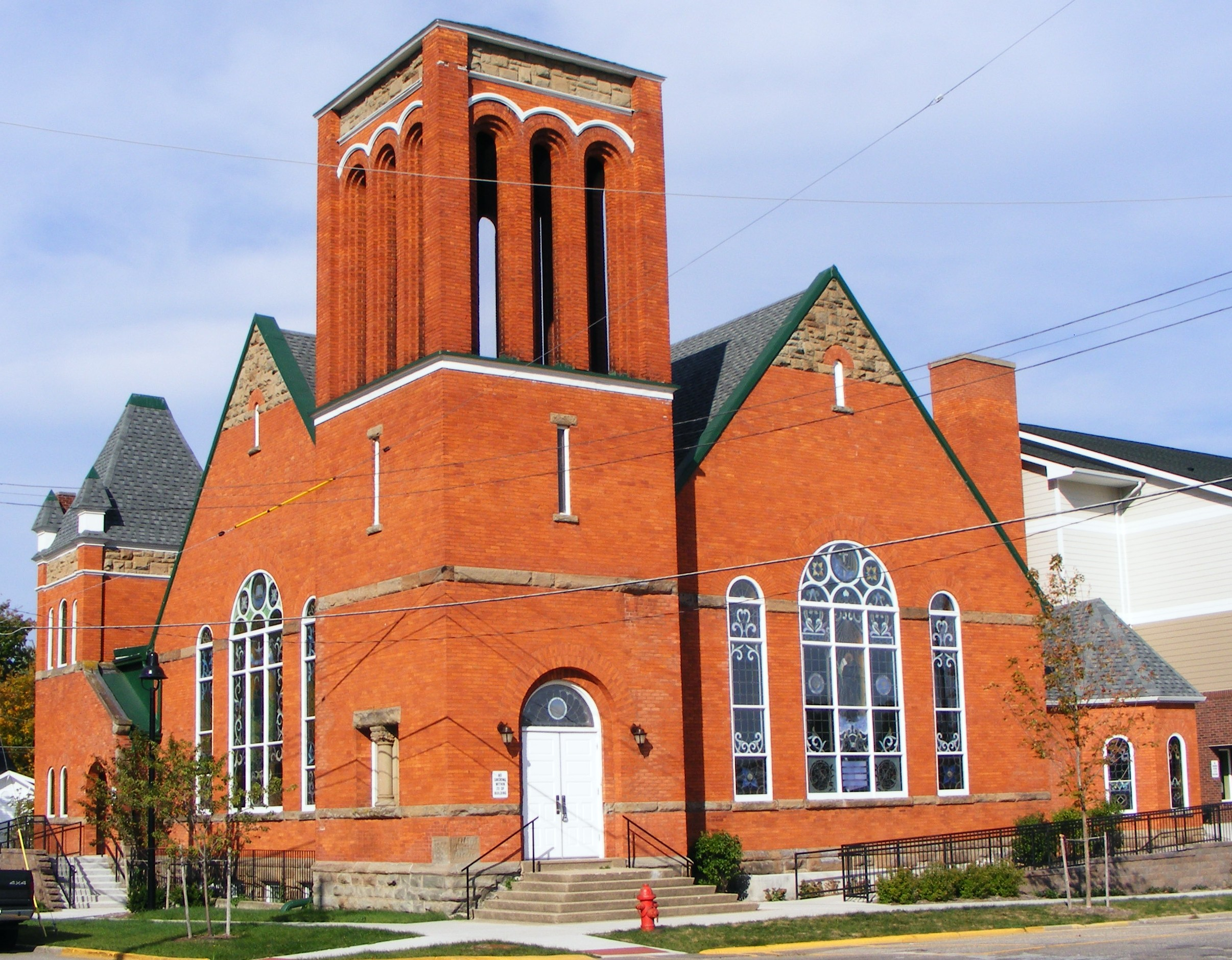

- Location within Michigan Location within the United States
- Interactive map showing the location for Griswold Civic Center Historic District
- Location: Roughly bounded by Hubbard, Walnut, and Trowbridge Sts., Allegan, Michigan
- Coordinates: 42°31′38″N 85°51′10″W
- Area: 4.3 acres (1.7 ha)
- Built: 1836
- Architect: Gordon W. Lloyd, Dillon P. Clark
- Architectural style: Late 19th And Early 20th Century American Movements, Late 19th And 20th Century Revivals, Late Victorian
- MPS: Allegan MRA
- NRHP reference No.: 87000253
- Added to NRHP: March 12, 1987

The Griswold Civic Center Historic District is a small historic district containing eight civic and religious buildings, roughly bounded by Hubbard, Walnut, and Trowbridge Streets, in Allegan, Michigan. It was added to the National Register of Historic Places in 1987.

== History ==
The original 1837 Allegan Company platting of the community provided a large plat of land as a public square. In 1839–41, the county constructed a jail and associated residence on the square, and added a brick county office building in 1847. A larger jail was built in 1861, and larger office building in 1871. In 1889, the county built a large courthouse in the center of the square. The jail was replaced one more time in 1905–06 with the present structure.

In the meantime, three church congregations constructed their churches surrounding the square. The United Methodist Church was founded in 1836, and in 1905 constructed the present building, the third on the same site. The First Baptist Church was established in 1841 and built the current structure in 1892–93. The Church of the Good Shepherd was founded in 1859 and still uses their original church building, constructed in 1867–69.

In the early twentieth century, Allegan's population increased, growing 20% between 1911 and 1917. IN 1913, community leaders obtained a $10,000 grant from the Carnegie Foundation to construct a new library. Plans were prepared by Grant Miller, a Chicago architect, and the library was constructed in 1914. Later, in 1981, local philanthropist Marilla Griswold left $100,000 to the city to build an auditorium and general meeting place. Despite delays, the Griswold Memorial Auditorium was completed until 1929.

The county replaced the courthouse with a modern structure in 1960–61. In 1962, a new jail was built, and the old jail used for other things.

== Description ==
The small Griswold Civic Center Historic District contains eight structures situated around the courthouse square. These include:

=== Old School ===
This building, constructed in 1836, is located at 325-27 Hubbard Street. It is a two-story structure with flank gables. The school was originally located a block from the square but was moved to its present location in the late 19th century. It served later as a boarding house, and has been converted to offices.

=== Carnegie Library ===
This building, constructed in 1914, is located at 331 Hubbard Street. It was designed by Chicago architect Grant Miller. It is a single-story brick Craftsman building with a tile-covered hipped roof and fieldstone foundation. A larger 1975 addition is located to the rear.

=== Griswold Memorial Auditorium ===
This building, constructed in 1929, is located at 401 Hubbard Street. It is a two-story asymmetrical brick building with limestone trim.

=== Church of the Good Shepherd ===
This building, constructed in 1867–69, is located at 101 Walnut Street. The building was designed by Gordon W. Lloyd. It is a frame, Gothic Revival church with a steeply pitched gable roof and a tall, pyramid-roof belfry. It is clad with vertical, board-and-batten siding and narrow lancet windows. A 1902 brick parish house is located next door.

=== Old Allegan County Sheriff's Residence and Jail ===
This building, constructed in 1905–1906, is located at 113 Walnut Street. It is a large red brick, Queen Anne/Colonial Revival structure with an octagonal corner tower and a Tuscan-column front porch. The building now serves as the county historical museum.

=== United Methodist Church ===
This building, constructed in 1905, is located at 401 Trowbridge Street. It is a Romanesque Revival building faced with random ashlar with a square corner tower.

=== First Baptist Church ===
This building, constructed in 1892, is located at 330 Trowbridge Street. It was designed by Bay City architect Dillon P. Clark. It is square orange brick Romanesque Revival structure with a tower at the street corner. A modern parish house addition is connected to one side.

=== Gallery ===
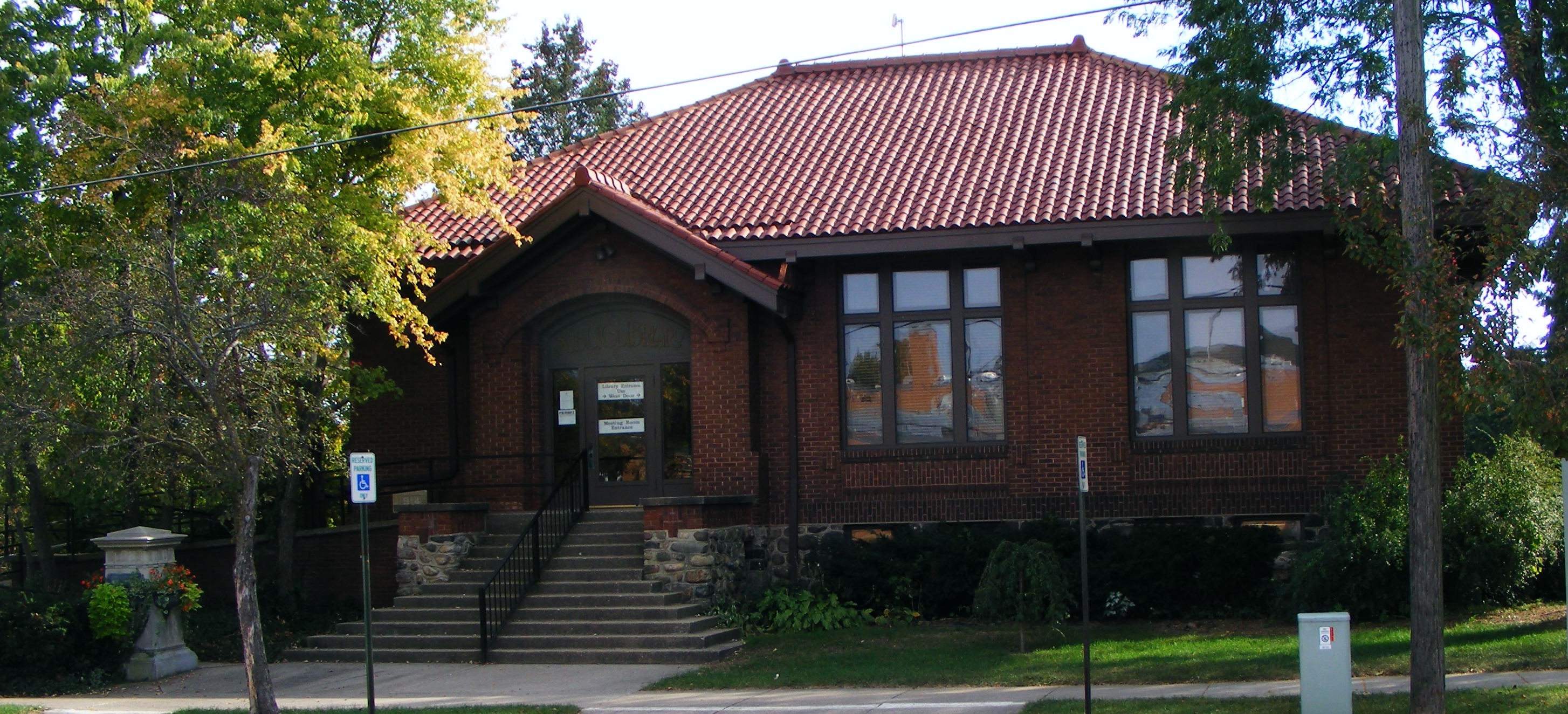
Carnegie Library

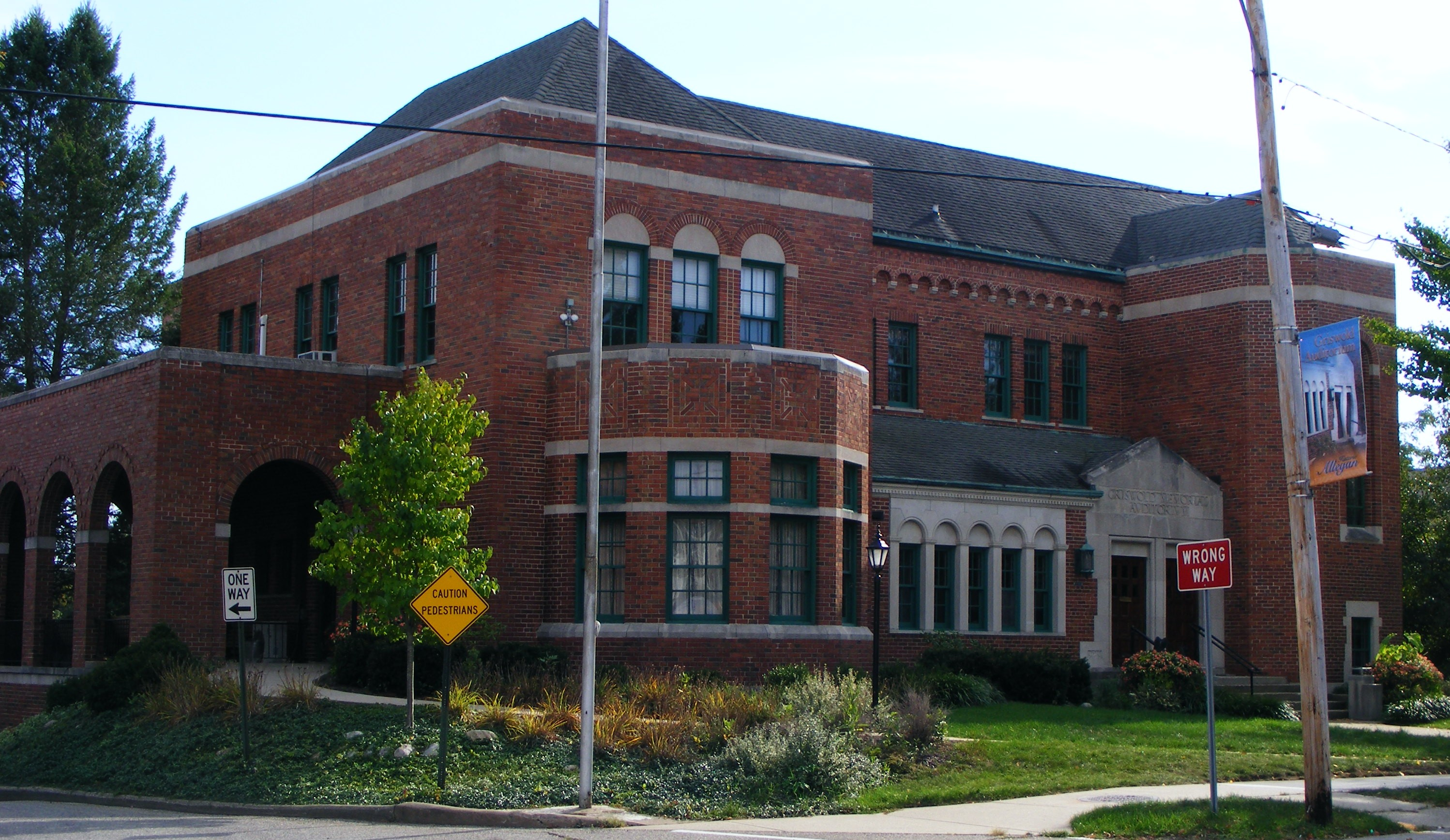
Griswold Memorial Auditorium

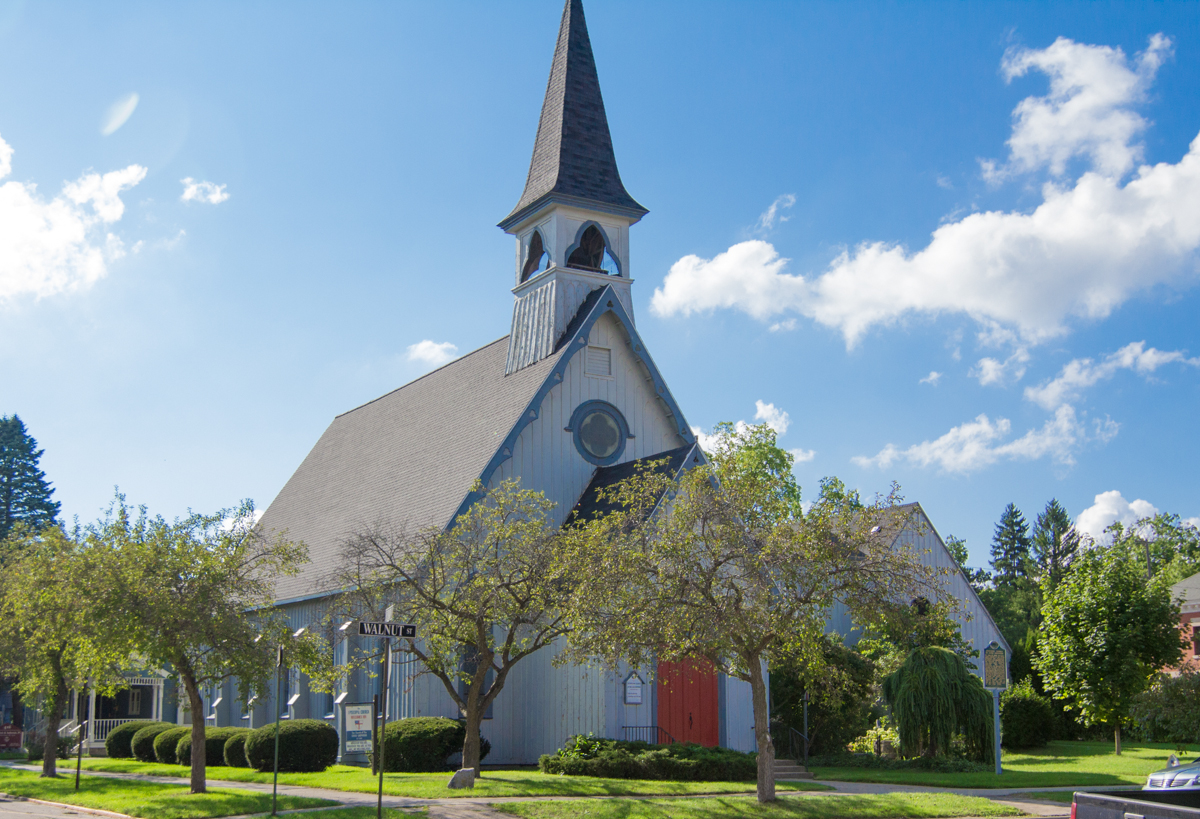
Church of the Good Shepherd

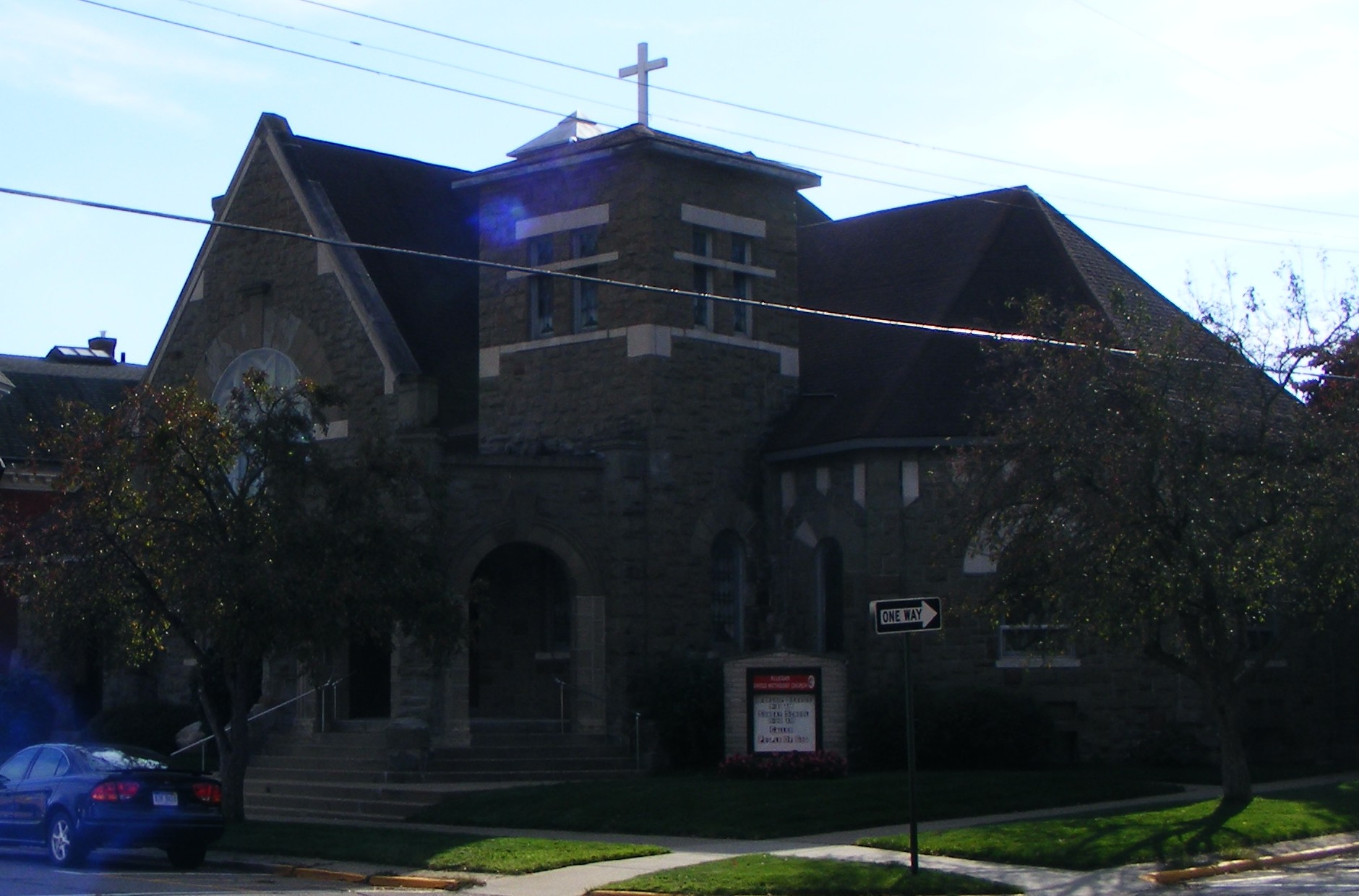
United Methodist Church

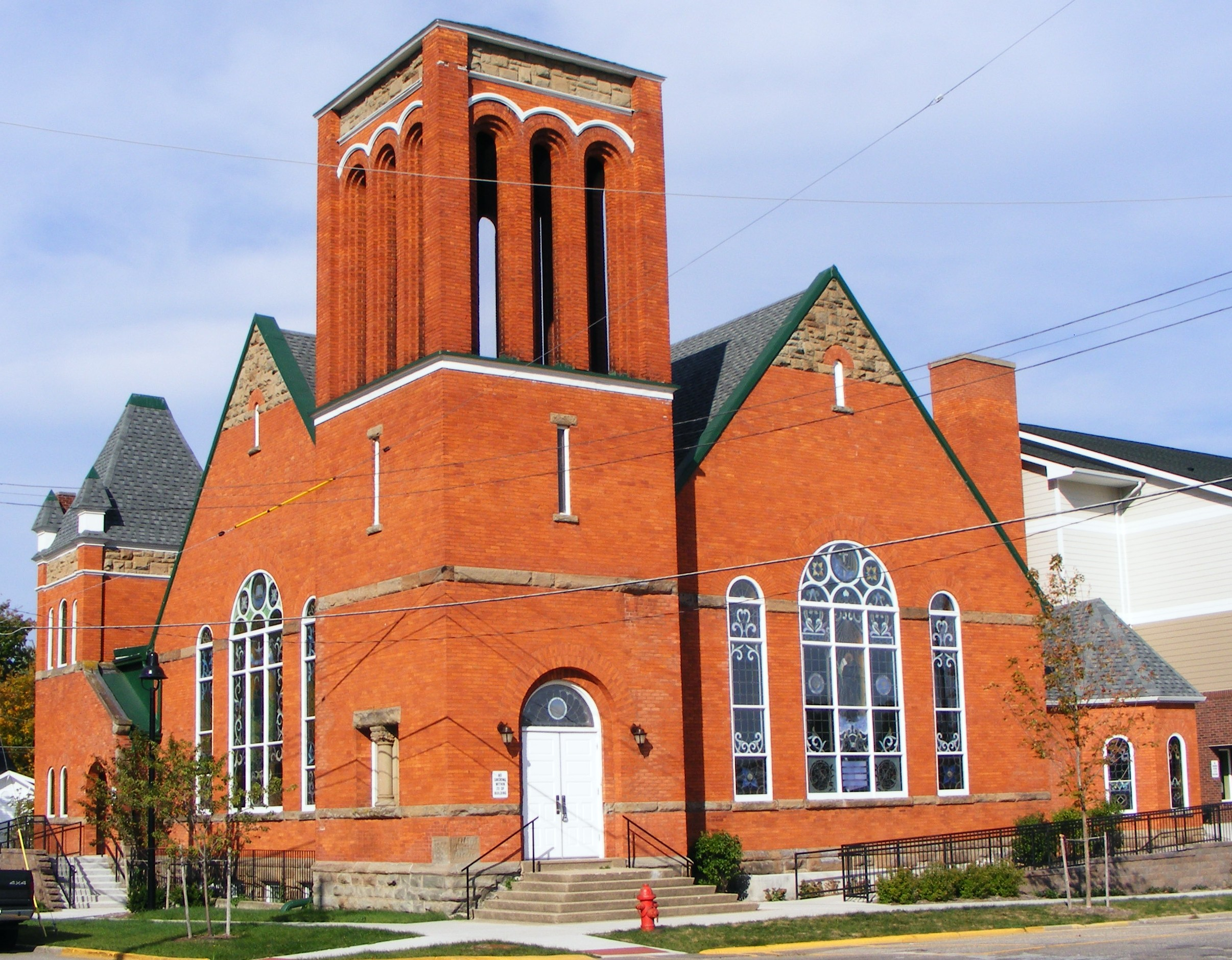
First Baptist Church
