= Giannini Hall =

Historic place in Berkeley, California

- U.S. National Register of Historic Places
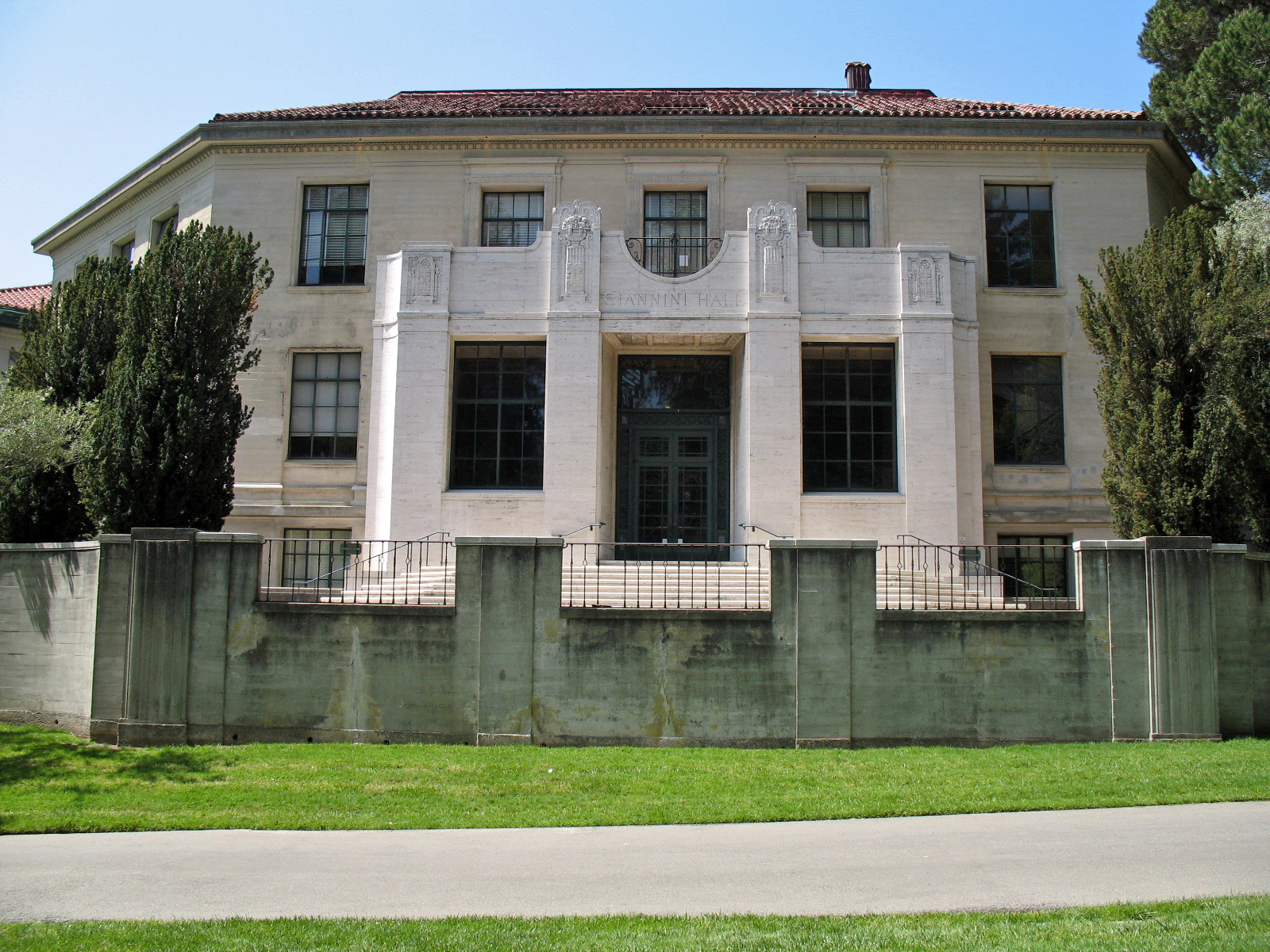
- Main entrance

- Location within Oakland, California Location within California Location within the United States
- Location: University House Way, Berkeley, California
- Coordinates: 37.873544°N 122.262361°W
- Built: 1930; 96 years ago
- Architect: William Charles Hays
- Architectural style: Neo-classical with Art Deco influences
- NRHP reference No.: 82004643
- Added to NRHP: March 25, 1982

Giannini Hall is a historic building in Berkeley, California, on the campus of the University of California, Berkeley. It was built in 1930 and is listed on the National Register of Historic Places.

== History ==
Giannini Hall was built in 1930, the gift of Amadeo Giannini, founder of the Bank of Italy (later Bank of America), who endowed the Giannini Foundation of Agricultural Economics at the university in 1928. The building was designed by William Charles Hays, a faculty member, and was dedicated on October 21, 1930. It was listed on the National Register of Historic Places on March 25, 1982, along with 16 other sites on the Berkeley campus.

== Building ==
Giannini Hall is a C-shaped reinforced concrete building in modernized Classical style. The entrance on the west facade, facing the courtyard, is at the top of a flight of steps and has an ornamental iron gateway; the entrances on the two wings are surmounted by balconies with ornamental iron railings. On the east facade, the windows on the top floor are flanked by cast concrete figures raising symbols of agriculture such as bags of grain, designed by the architect's wife, Ellah Hays. The main entrance has Regency detailing and an Art Deco wrought iron door; the two-level lobby, more ornate than was usual on the campus, has a polychrome beamed ceiling and metal chandeliers, also Art Deco in style, and a memorial to Giannini.

With the older Hilgard Hall and Wellman Hall, Giannini Hall completed the Agricultural Complex on the central campus, which was envisaged by the architect of Hilgard Hall, John Galen Howard, as a group of buildings around a courtyard in the manner of a Tuscan farm. The area was landscaped with stone pines (for which Howard brought seeds from Italy), cypresses, and olives.

In addition to the Giannini Foundation Library, Giannini Hall houses classrooms used by Rausser College of Natural Resources.

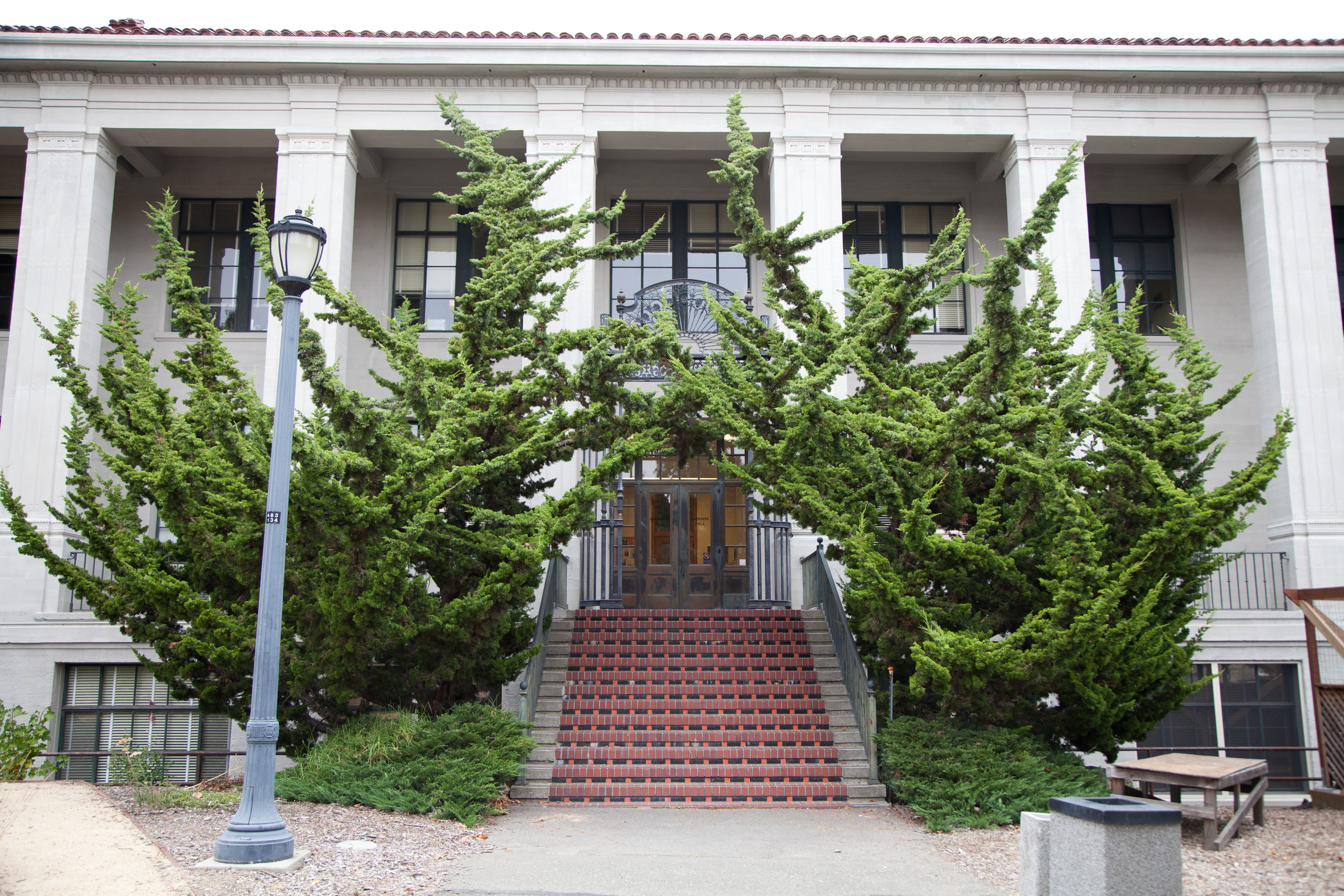
Courtyard entrance

== See also ==
- National Register of Historic Places listings in Alameda County, California
- List of Berkeley Landmarks in Berkeley, California
