= Durant Hall =

Historic place in Berkeley, California

- U.S. National Register of Historic Places
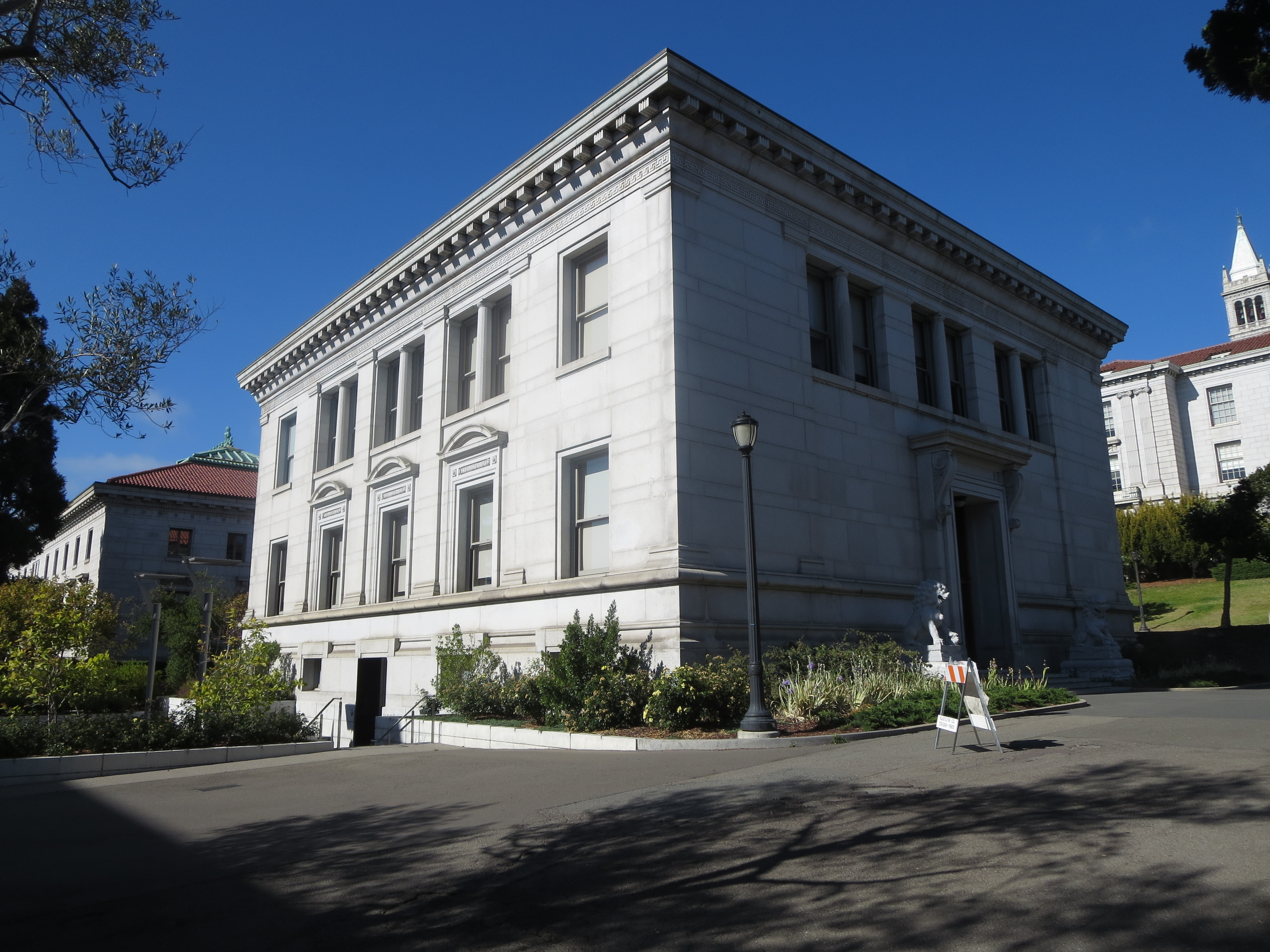
- Durant Hall

- Location within Oakland, California Location within California Location within the United States
- Location: University of California, Berkeley, Berkeley, California
- Coordinates: 37.871258°N 122.260128°W
- Built: 1911; 115 years ago
- Architect: John Galen Howard
- NRHP reference No.: 82004640
- Added to NRHP: March 25, 1982

Durant Hall is a historical building in Berkeley, California. It was originally dedicated in 1911 as the Boalt Memorial Hall of Law, and was named in the memory of Judge John H. Boalt (1837–1901) because his wife, Mrs. Elizabeth J. Boalt, gave $100,000 towards its construction. A group of California lawyers gave $50,000. The four-story building was designed by architect John Galen Howard (1864-1931) in the Beaux-Arts style, like much of the core campus of the University of California, Berkeley.

From 1911 to 1951, the building was the home of the UC Berkeley School of Jurisprudence, which later became the School of Law. By 1921, enrollment had reached 285, which was clearly too much for a building of that size and resulted in severe overcrowding. The building's tiny size was one of the primary constraints on the growth of the law school at Berkeley for over three decades.

In 1951, the law school finally moved to a newly-constructed law building in the southeastern corner of campus, which was dedicated as the new Boalt Hall. The old Boalt Hall was renamed Durant Hall in honor of the first president of the University of California Berkeley, Henry Durant (1802-1875), president from 1870 to 1872.

Durant Hall was then home to UC Berkeley's East Asian Library from 1951 to 2007. That library also grew too big for Durant Hall, and like the law school, was suffering from severe overcrowding by the time it moved to the new C.V. Starr East Asian Library building in 2008.

The building was listed on the National Register of Historic Places on March 25, 1982.

In 2010, after a renovation, Durant Hall reopened as the new home for the offices of the deans of the UC Berkeley College of Letters and Science.

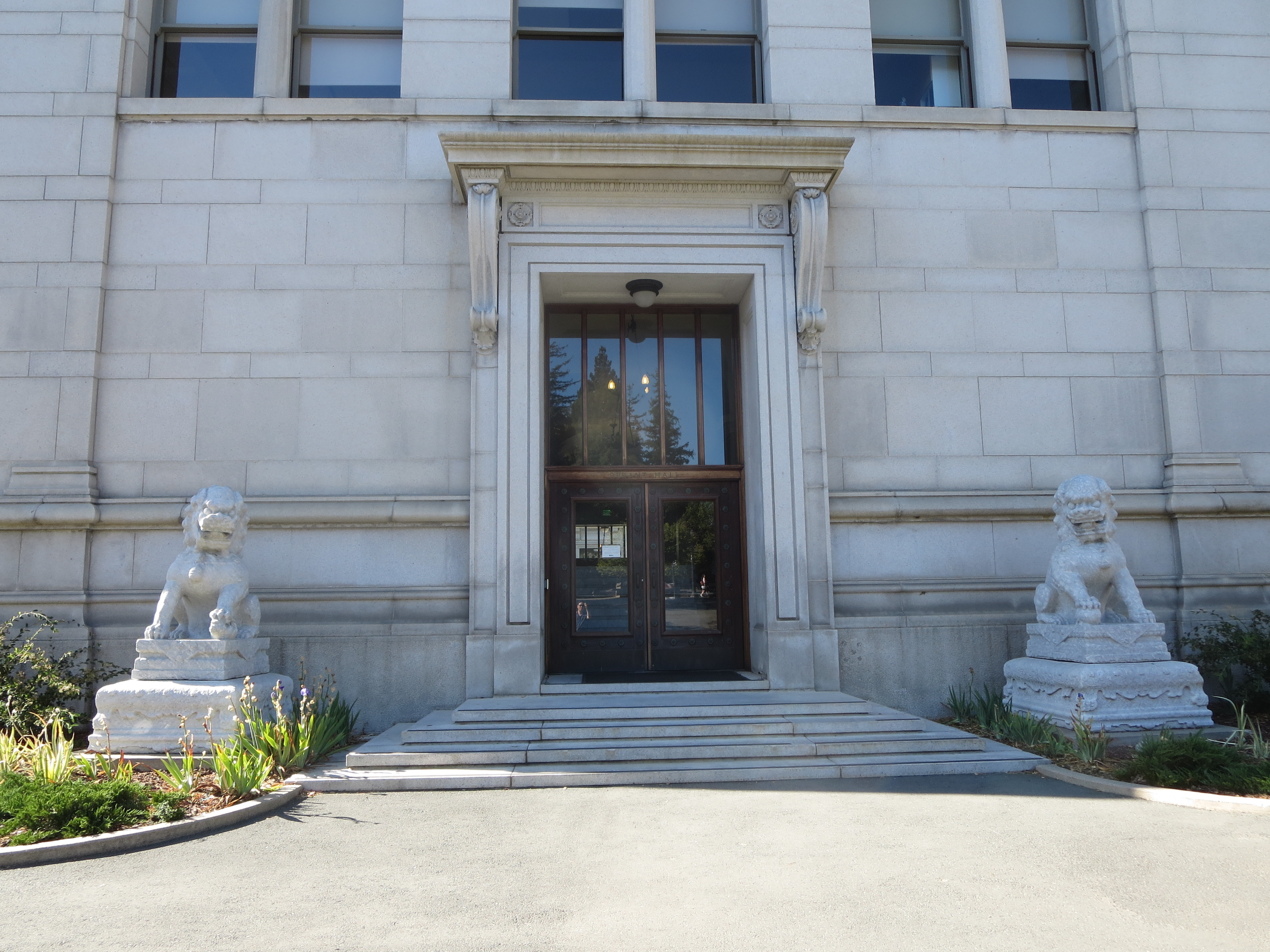
Durant Hall lion statues

== See also ==
- National Register of Historic Places listings in Alameda County, California
- List of Berkeley Landmarks in Berkeley, California
