= John W. Reid Jr. =

American architect (1879–1968)

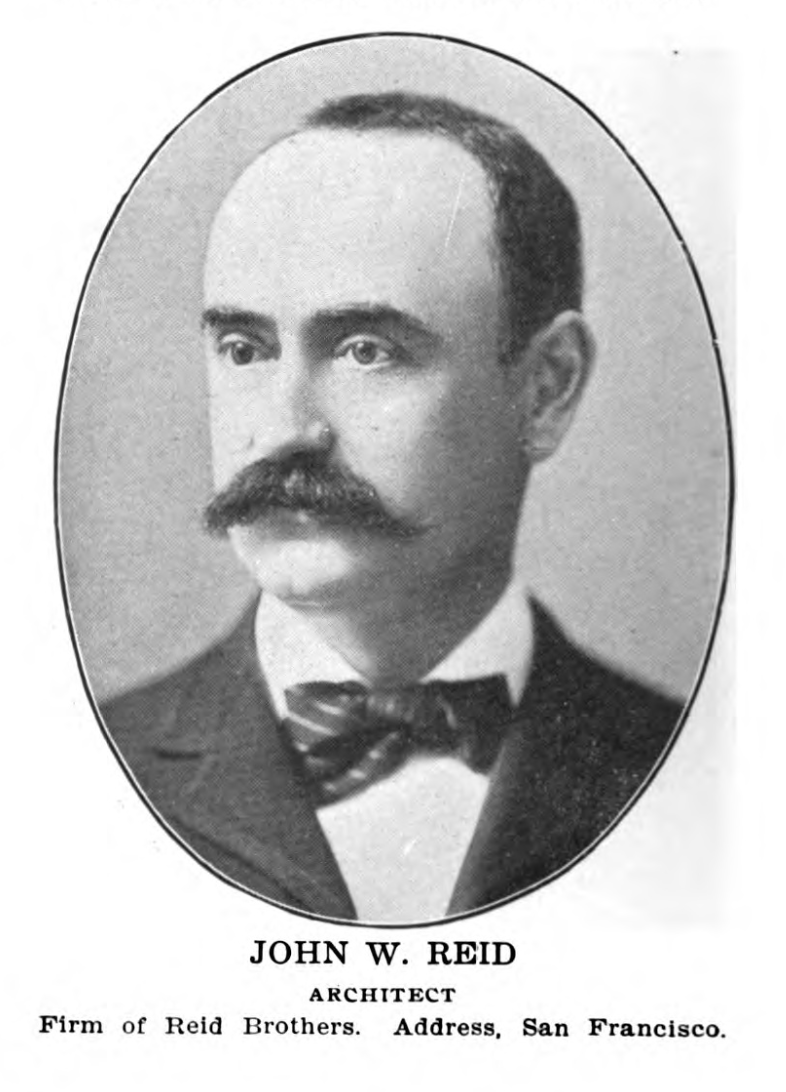
Reid, c. 1901

John W. Reid Jr. (December 26, 1879 – December 15, 1968) was an American architect. He served as the San Francisco city architect from 1918 until 1930.

== Biography ==
John W. Reid Jr. was born on December 26, 1879, in San Francisco, California. He studied architecture at the University of California, Berkeley under John Galen Howard, and then continued at the École Nationale Supérieure des Beaux-Arts in Paris.

Upon his return, he joined Daniel Burnham's firm, where he worked as a draftsman for architect Willis Polk. In 1911, he established his own office, which designed a number of city buildings. He served as city architect during the tenure of mayor (later governor) James Rolph, who was married to Reid's sister. As city architect, he drew up designs for buildings as directed by the board of public works, and supervised their construction, for which he was paid a fee of 6% of the total construction cost. Reid was a consulting architect for the San Francisco Civic Center, including the San Francisco City Hall, and best known for his designs of city schools and libraries, the San Francisco Fire Chief's House, and the Union Iron Works Turbine Machine Shop.
