= Hilgard Hall =

Historic place in Berkeley, California

- U.S. National Register of Historic Places
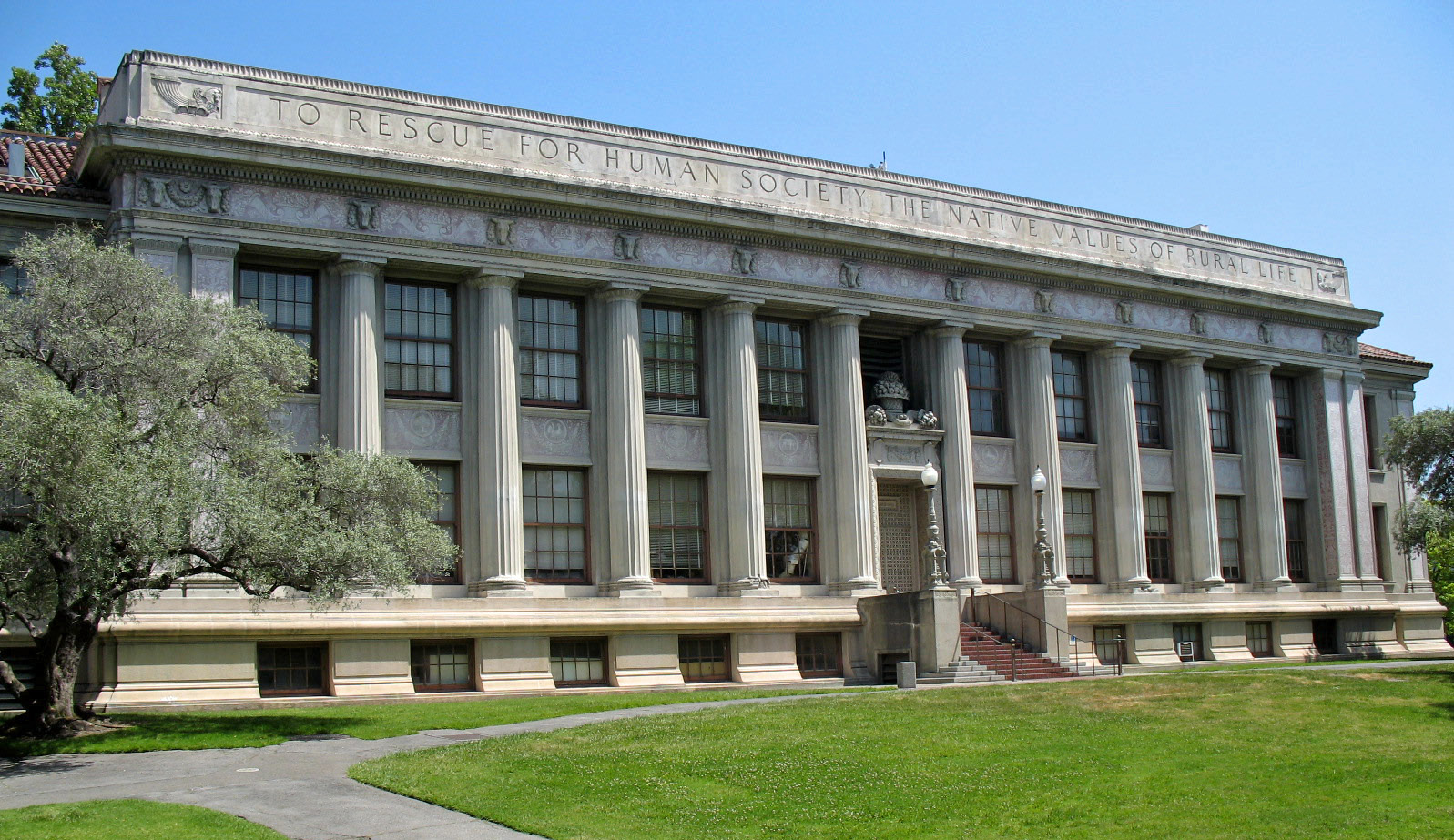
- Hilgard Hall

- Location within Oakland, California Location within California Location within the United States
- Location: Oxford Street, Berkeley, California
- Coordinates: 37.873300°N 122.263400°W
- Built: 1917; 109 years ago
- Architect: John Galen Howard
- Architectural style: Neo-classical design
- NRHP reference No.: 82004647
- Added to NRHP: March 25, 1982

Hilgard Hall is a historical building in Berkeley, California. The Hilgard Hall was built in 1917. The building and its site was listed on the National Register of Historic Places on March 25, 1982. Hilgard Hall is named for pedologist, Eugene W. Hilgard. Hilgard was the first dean of the University of California College of Agriculture from 1874 to 1904 at the University of California Berkeley. Eugene Hilgard also founded the University Agricultural Experimental Station. Hilgard Hall was designed by John Galen Howard in a Neo-classical design and Northern Italian Renaissance style. The Agricultural Complex has three buildings, Hilgard Hall, Wellman Hall, and Giannini Hall.

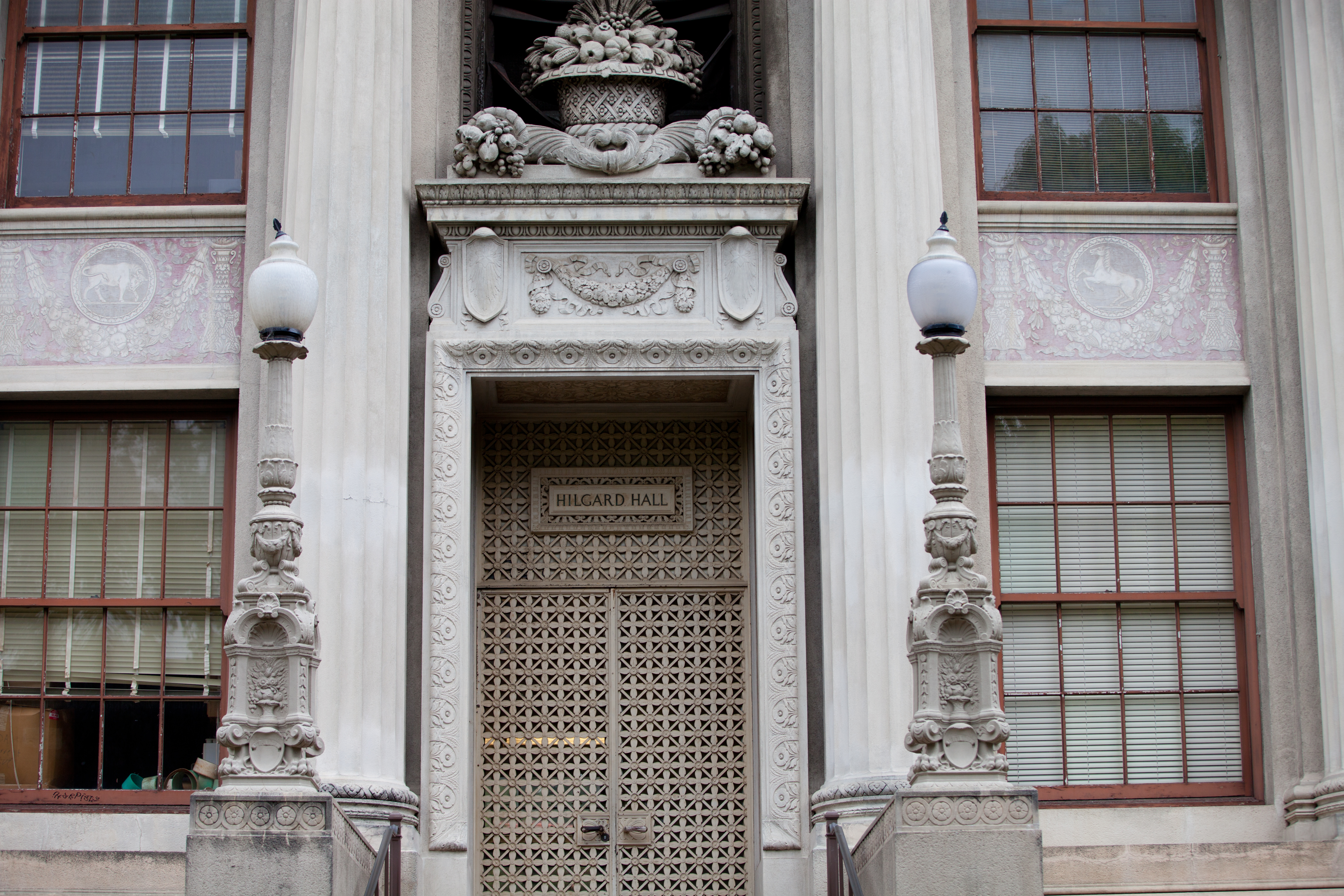
Hilgard Hall

== See also ==
- National Register of Historic Places listings in Alameda County, California
- List of Berkeley Landmarks in Berkeley, California
