= John Galen Howard =

American architect (1864–1931)

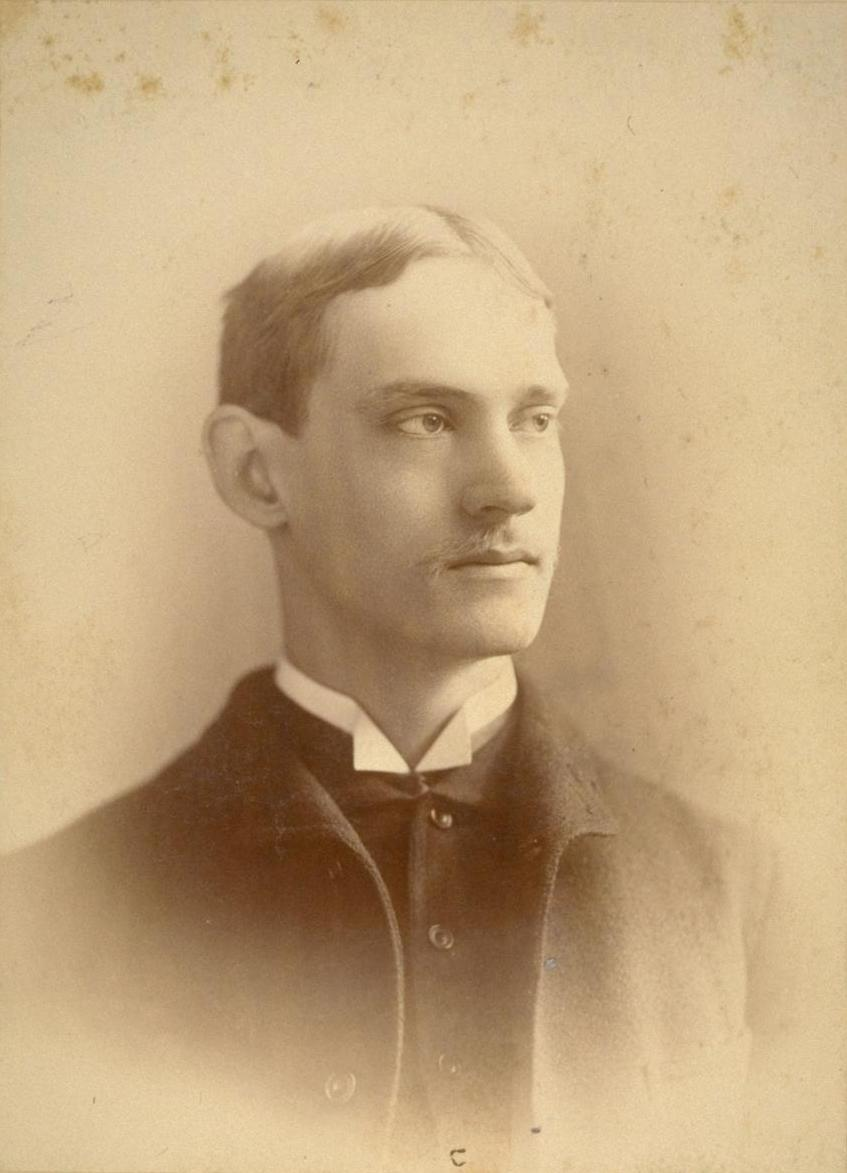
- Howard in 1886
- Born: May 8, 1864; Chelmsford, Massachusetts, US
- Died: July 18, 1931 (aged 67); San Francisco, California, US
- Education: Massachusetts Institute of Technology
- Occupation: Architect
- Children: 6, including Robert Boardman Howard, John Langley Howard
- Awards: Fellow of the American Institute of Architects (1901)
- Practice: Howard & Cauldwell (1893-99); Howard, Cauldwell & Morgan (1899-1901); John Galen Howard (1902-06 and 1908-23); Howard & Galloway (1906-08); John Galen Howard & Associates (1923-27)
- Projects: University of California, Berkeley, School of Architecture

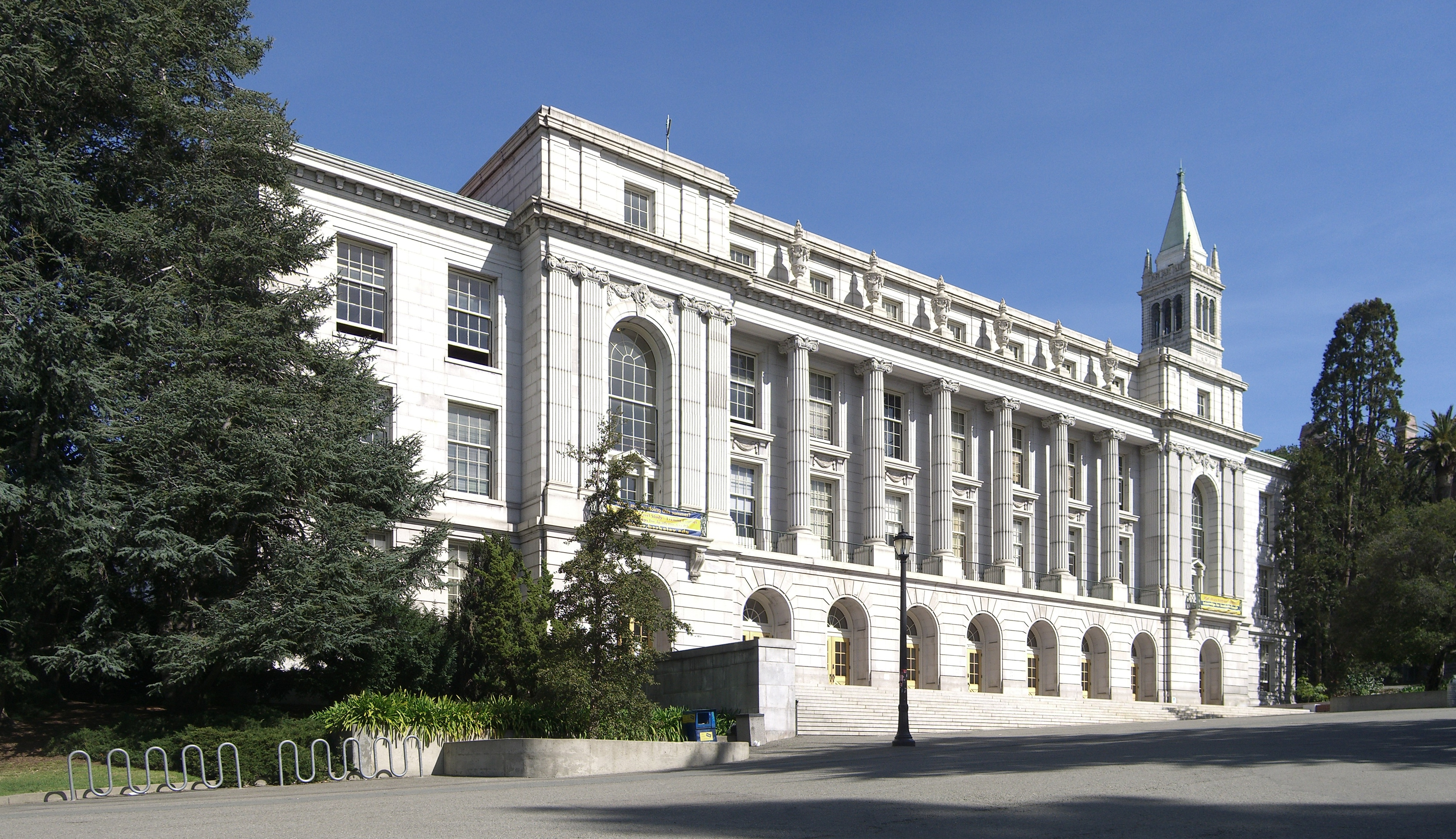
Wheeler Hall at the University of California, Berkeley, designed by Howard and completed in 1917. In the background is Sather Tower, completed by Howard in 1915.

John Galen Howard (May 8, 1864 – July 18, 1931) was an American architect and educator who began his career in New York before moving to California. He was the principal architect at several firms in both states and employed Julia Morgan early in her architectural career.

== Early life and education ==
John Galen Howard was born May 8, 1864, in Chelmsford, Massachusetts. Howard was son of physician, Levi Howard and Lydia Jane Hapgood, a homemaker and he had four brothers. Howard was educated at the Massachusetts Institute of Technology (1882 to 1885) and the École des Beaux-Arts (1891 to 1893).

== Career ==
He worked for H. H. Richardson in Brookline, for his successors Shepley, Rutan & Coolidge in Boston and for McKim, Mead & White in New York City.

Howard began professional practice in 1893, when he formed the firm of Howard & Cauldwell with engineer Samuel M. Cauldwell. In 1899, they were joined by Lewis Henry Morgan, and the firm became known as Howard, Cauldwell & Morgan. Works in the east included the Electric Tower, the centerpiece of the 1901 Pan-American Exposition. They also submitted an unsuccessful entry in the competition to design the Master Plan for the University of California, Berkeley. Despite not winning the commission outright, in 1901 Howard dissolved his partnership when he was chosen by the Regents of the university to execute the accepted plan, known as the Hearst Plan. In 1902, he reestablished his practice at Berkeley, and in 1903 formally established the School of Architecture, now part of the College of Environmental Design. As supervising architect of the University of California, Howard built extensively. His most famous buildings are the Campanile, California Memorial Stadium, Sather Gate and the Hearst Greek Theatre.

In 1904, Howard relocated his office to San Francisco, and after the 1906 San Francisco earthquake formed the firm of Howard & Galloway with engineer John D. Galloway. This partnership was dissolved in 1908. After fifteen more years of private practice he formed the firm of John Galen Howard & Associates, with associates Henry Temple Howard, E. Geoffrey Bangs, Henry C. Collins and Charles F. B. Roeth. Howard's projects during these years include several buildings at the Alaska–Yukon–Pacific Exposition in Seattle, three of which were designed to be reused by the University of Washington, (Note: The reused buildings were: Fine Arts became Architecture Hall, the Auditorium became Meany Hall and Machinery Hall became Engineering Hall.) and the San Francisco Civic Auditorium. Howard's influence at the university began to wane after the retirement of president Benjamin Ide Wheeler in 1919, and he was seen as uncooperative by the Board of Regents. In 1922, the commission for the new Hearst Memorial Gymnasium was awarded to Julia Morgan and Bernard Maybeck without his input, and in 1924 his contract as supervising architect was not renewed. In 1927, he resigned as director of the School of Architecture and retired from his architecture practice, though he continued to teach at the university until his death in 1931.

== Personal life ==
He married Mary Robertson Bradbury on August 1, 1893. They had five children; Henry Temple Howard (1894–1967) was an architect who worked with his father; Robert Boardman Howard (1896–1983), became a sculptor and married another noted Bay Area sculptor, Adaline Kent (1900–1957); other children included Charles Houghton Howard (1899–1978), John Langley Howard (1902–1999) both were known artists of the time, and Jeanette Howard Wallace (1905–1998).

== Legacy ==
Howard's primary legacy is as the founder of the formal School of Architecture at the University of California, Berkeley, and as a designer of buildings on the university campus. He is also noted as the first American employer of Julia Morgan from 1902 to 1904, though she did not look on her experience with him fondly.

Howard completed many notable projects and was elected a Fellow in the American Institute of Architects in 1901. In 1910, he was elected into the National Academy of Design as an Associate Academician.

Many of Howard's works are listed on the United States National Register of Historic Places (NRHP).

== Works ==
=== Buildings for the University of California, Berkeley ===
- Hearst Memorial Mining Building, University of California, Berkeley, Berkeley, California (1902–07, NRHP 1982)
- Hearst Greek Theatre, University of California, Berkeley, Berkeley, California (1903, NRHP 1982)
- Senior Hall, University of California, Berkeley, Berkeley, California (1903–06, NRHP 1982)
- Doe Memorial Library, University of California, Berkeley, Berkeley, California (1904–11, NRHP 1982)
- California Hall, University of California, Berkeley, Berkeley, California (1905, NRHP 1982)
- North Gate Hall, University of California, Berkeley, Berkeley, California (1906, NRHP 1982)
- Sather Gate, University of California, Berkeley, Berkeley, California (1910, NRHP 1982)
- Durant Hall, University of California, Berkeley, Berkeley, California (1911, NRHP 1982)
- Wellman Hall, University of California, Berkeley, Berkeley, California (1912, NRHP 1982)
- Drawing Building, University of California, Berkeley, Berkeley, California (1914, NRHP 1976)
- Sather Tower, University of California, Berkeley, Berkeley, California (1914–15, NRHP 1982)
- Gilman Hall, University of California, Berkeley, Berkeley, California (1916–17)
- Hilgard Hall, University of California, Berkeley, Berkeley, California (1917, NRHP 1982)
- Wheeler Hall, University of California, Berkeley, Berkeley, California (1917, NRHP 1982)
- Dwinelle Hall Annex, University of California, Berkeley, Berkeley, California (1920)
- California Memorial Stadium, University of California, Berkeley, Berkeley, California (1922–23, NRHP 2006, rebuilt 2010–12)
- Haviland Hall, University of California, Berkeley, Berkeley, California (1924, NRHP 1982)
- LeConte Hall, University of California, Berkeley, Berkeley, California (1924, NRHP 1982)

=== Buildings elsewhere ===
- Hotel Renaissance annex, Fifth Ave and W 43rd St, New York City (1896, demolished)
- Barringer High School (former), 90 Parker St, Newark, New Jersey (1898–99, demolished)
- Cutler Majestic Theatre, 219 Tremont St, Boston, Massachusetts (1901–03)
- Electric Tower, Pan-American Exposition, Buffalo, New York (1901, temporary structure)
- Carnegie Library (former), 73 Church St, Montclair, New Jersey (1902–04, NRHP 1988)
- Cloyne Court Hotel, 2600 Ridge Rd, Berkeley, California (1904, NRHP 1982)
- Berkeley Public Library, 2090 Kittredge St, Berkeley, California (1905, demolished 1929)
- House for Adolph C. Miller, (Note: Now Ridge House of the Berkeley Student Cooperative.) 2420 Ridge Rd, Berkeley, California (1907)
- Auditorium (later Meany Hall), University of Washington, Seattle, Washington (1907–09, demolished 1965)
- Chemistry Hall (now Architecture Hall), University of Washington, Seattle, Washington (1907–09)
- Engineering Hall, University of Washington, Seattle, Washington (1907–09, demolished)
- Italian American Bank Building, (Note: The facades of this building survive as part of 456 Montgomery Plaza, completed in 1985.) 460 Montgomery St, San Francisco, California (1907, modified)
- Empire Building, 37 Old Courthouse Sq, Santa Rosa, California (1908–10)
- Adam Grant Building, 114 Sansome St, San Francisco, California (1908)
- United States Government Building and exhibition halls, Alaska–Yukon–Pacific Exposition, Seattle, Washington (1908–09, temporary structures)
- John Galen Howard House (also known as the Gregory/Howard House), 1401 Le Roy Ave along Rose Walk, Berkeley, California (1912); a Berkeley Landmark;
- Pierce-Arrow Building, 1001 Polk St, San Francisco, California (1912-13)
- San Francisco Civic Auditorium, (Note: Designed in association with Frederick Herman Meyer and John W. Reid Jr.) 99 Grove St, San Francisco, California (1913–15)
- Berkeley National Bank Building, Center St and Shattuck Ave, Berkeley, California (1914, demolished)
- First Congregational Church, 2501 Harris St, Berkeley, California (1923–25)

== Gallery of works ==
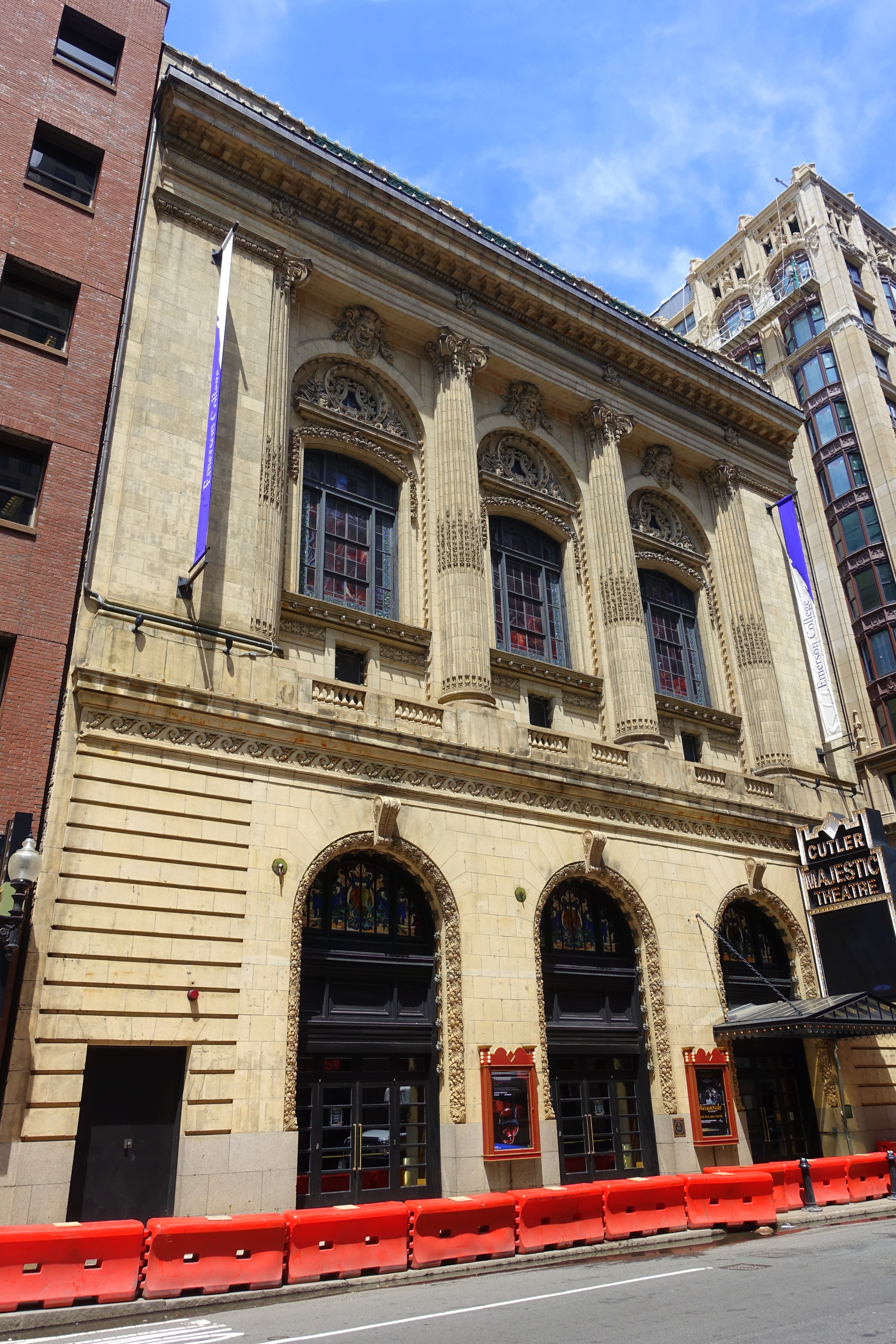
Cutler Majestic Theatre, Boston, Massachusetts, 1901-03.

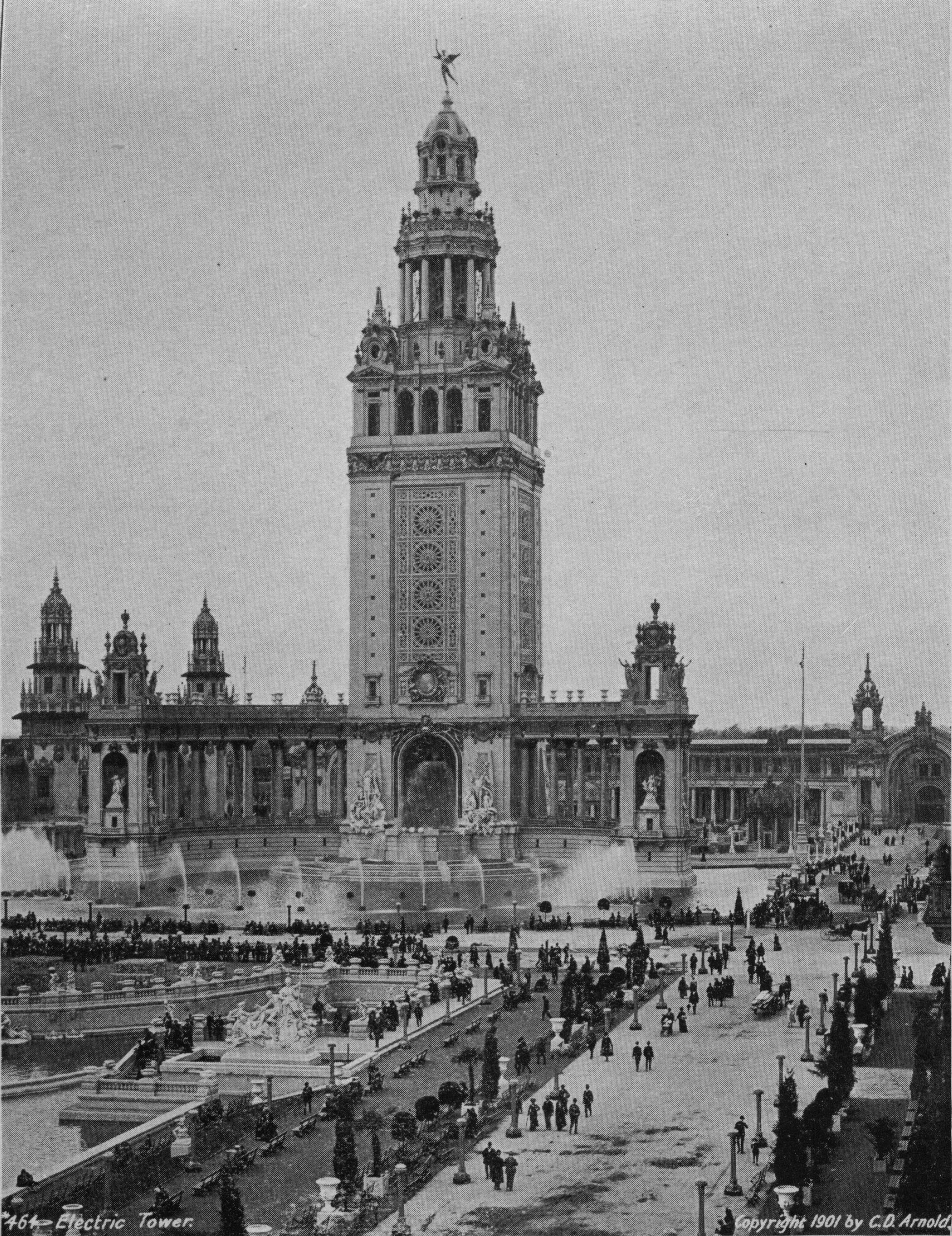
Electric Tower, Pan-American Exposition, Buffalo, New York, 1901.

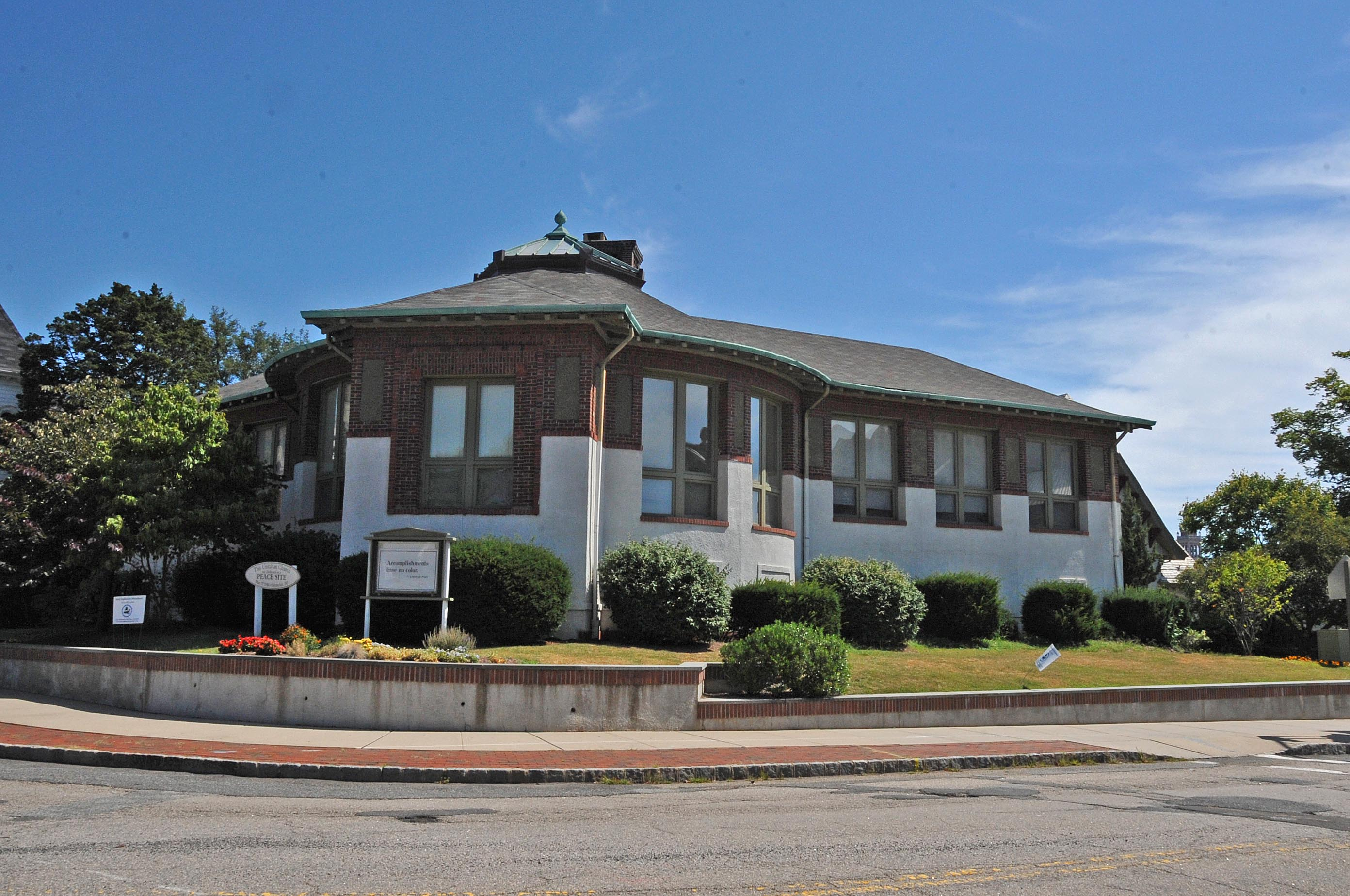
Carnegie Library, Montclair, New Jersey, 1902-04.

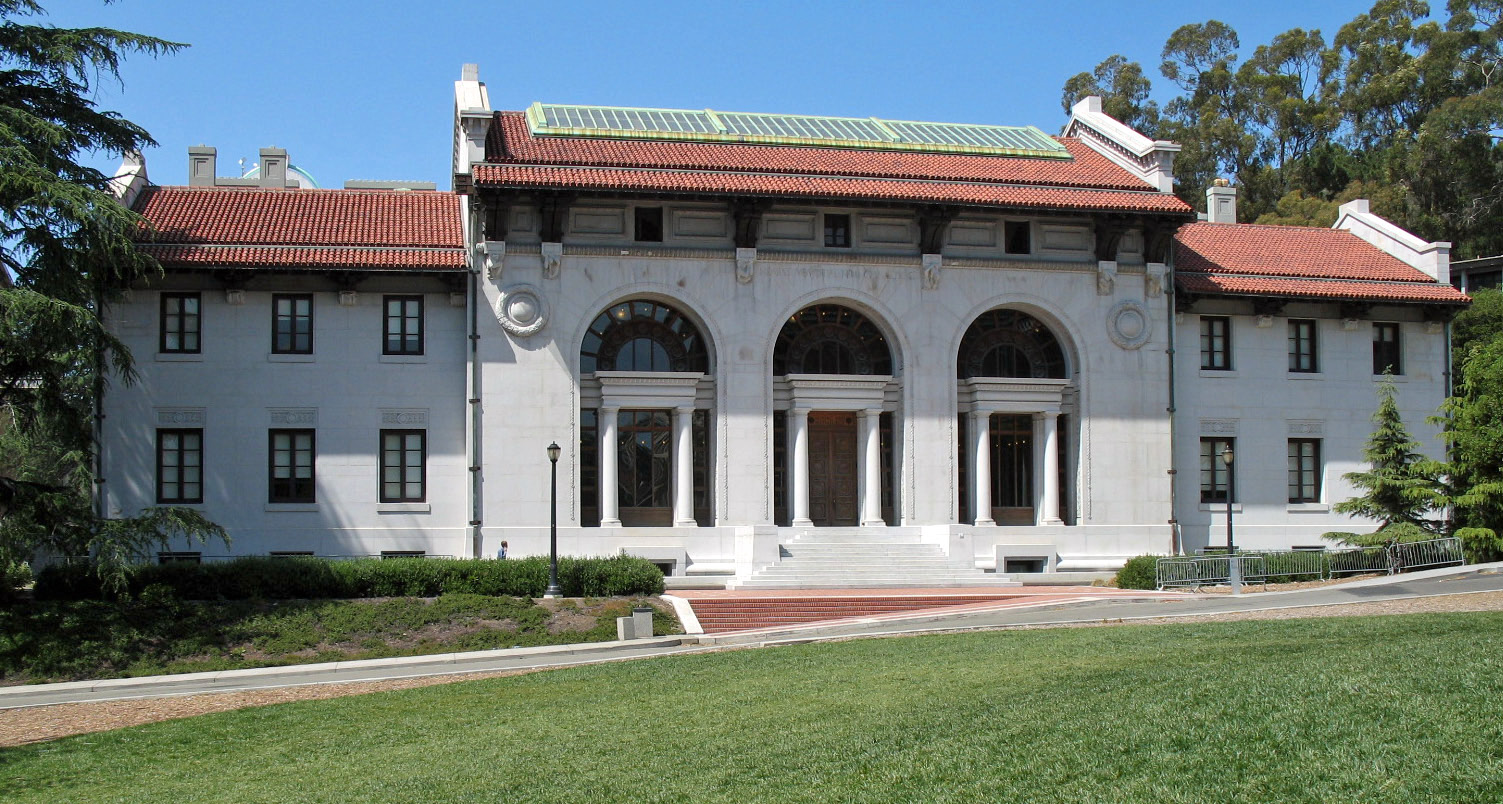
Hearst Memorial Mining Building, University of California, Berkeley, Berkeley, California, 1902-07.

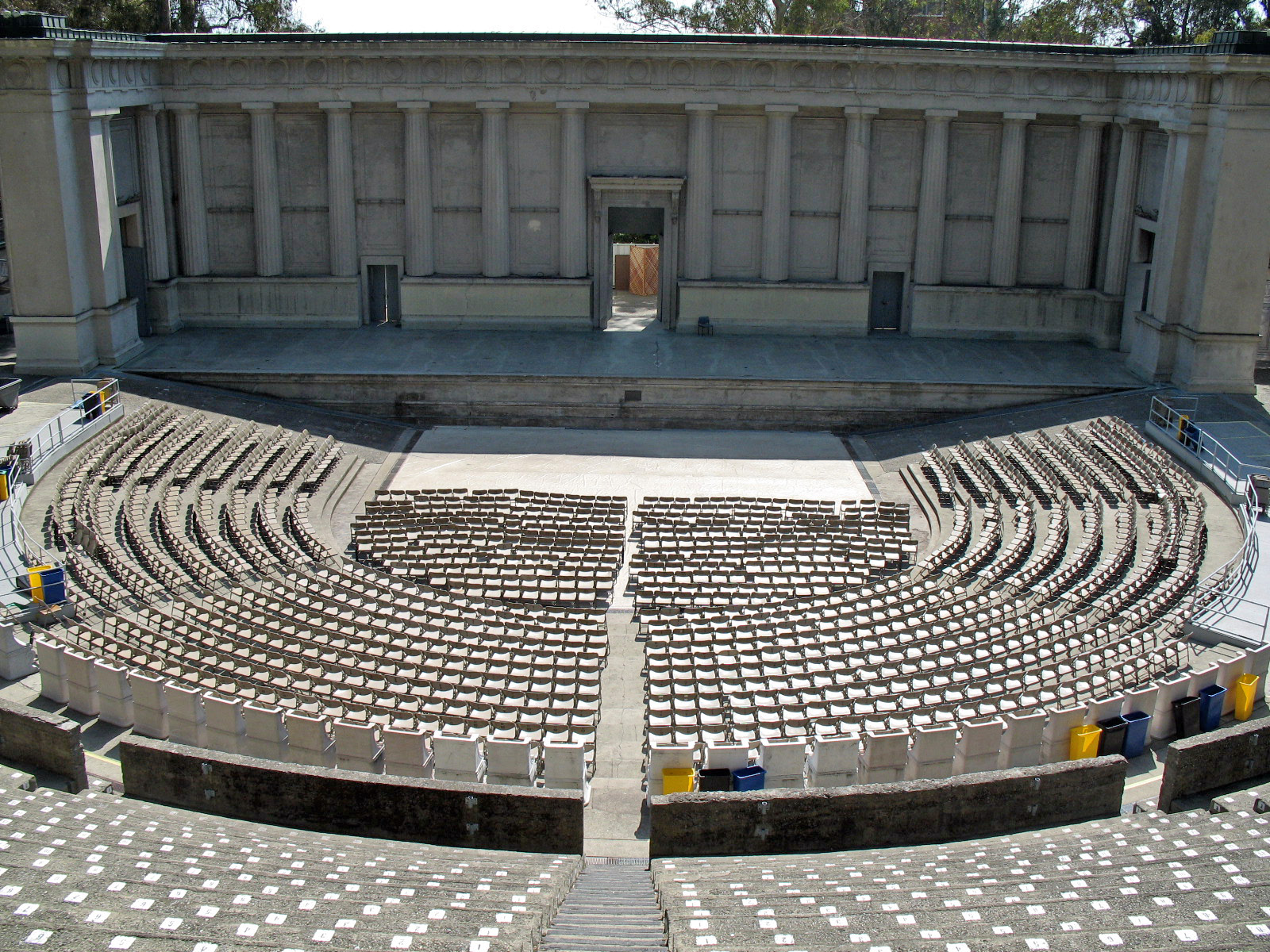
Hearst Greek Theatre, University of California, Berkeley, Berkeley, California, 1903.

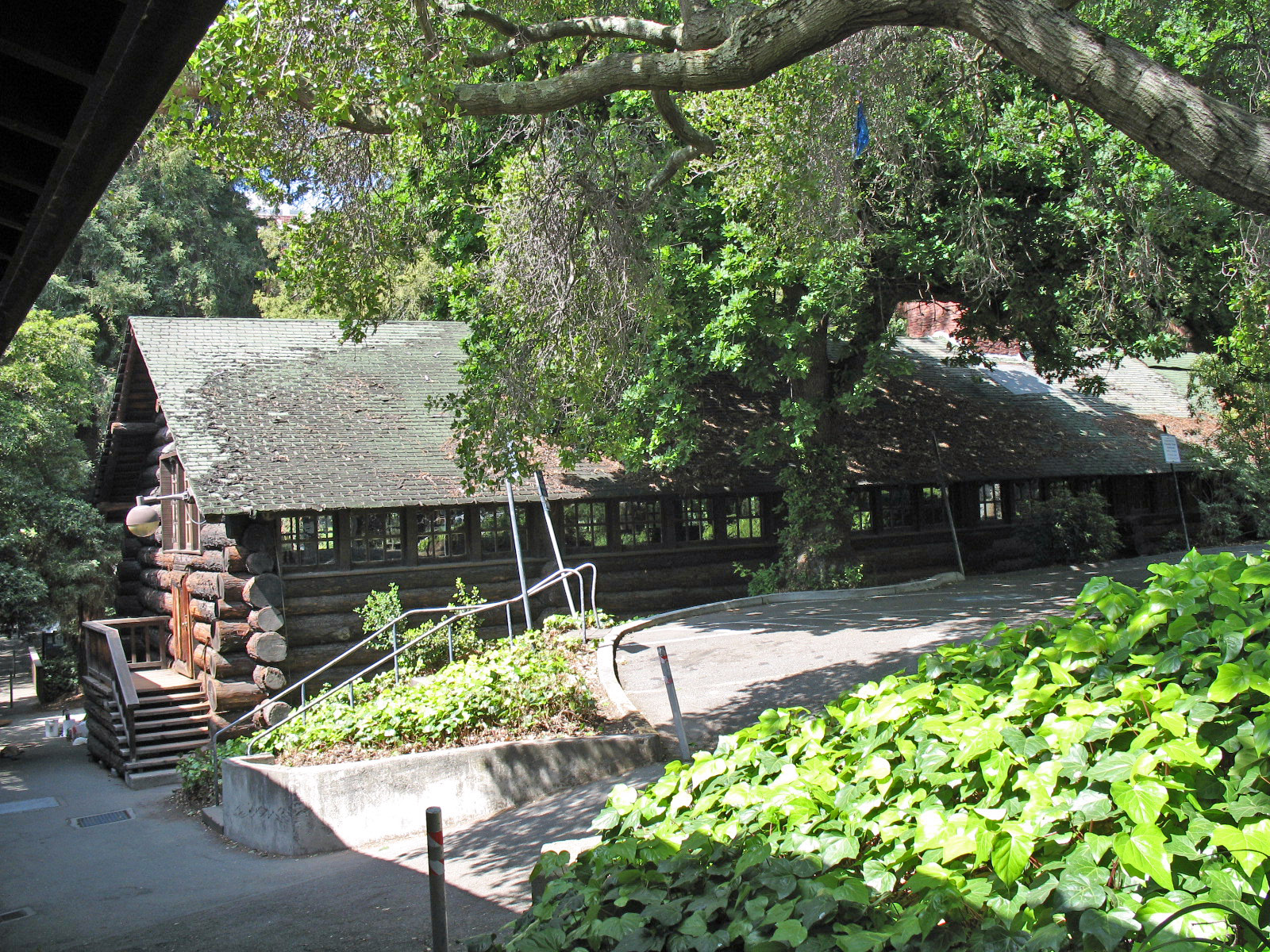
Senior Hall, University of California, Berkeley, Berkeley, California, 1903-06.

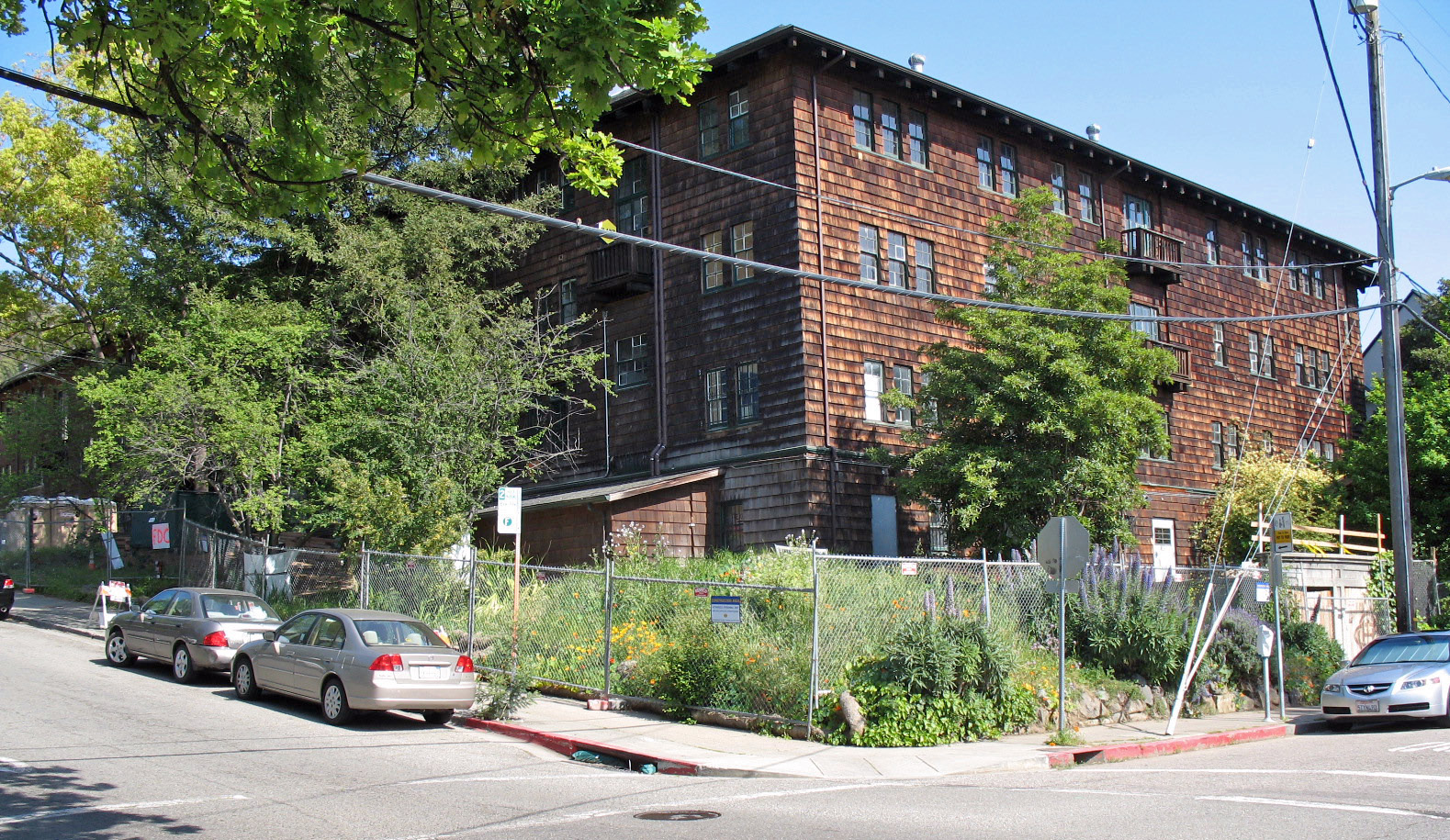
Cloyne Court Hotel, Berkeley, California, 1904.

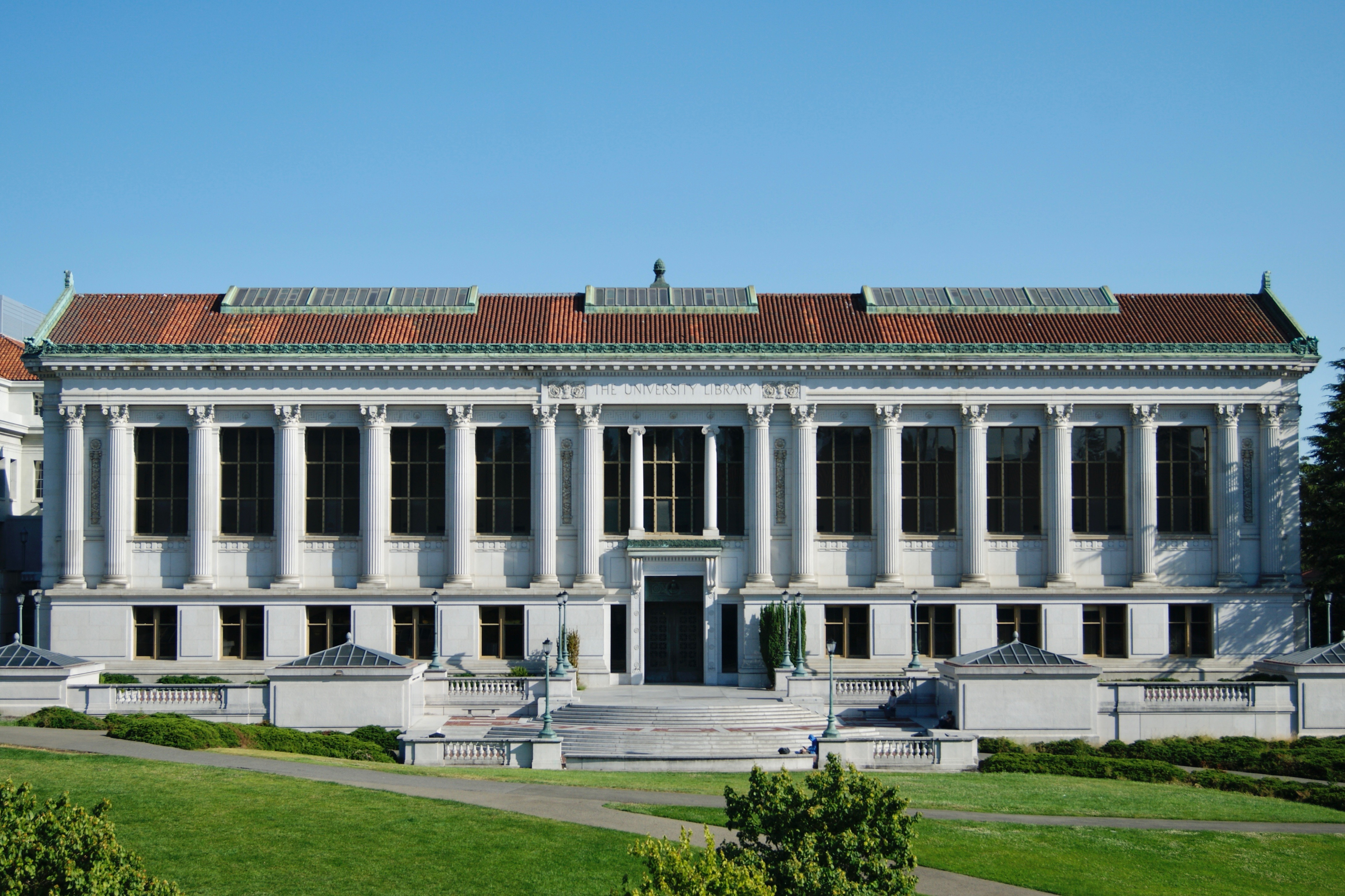
Doe Memorial Library, University of California, Berkeley, Berkeley, California, 1904-11.

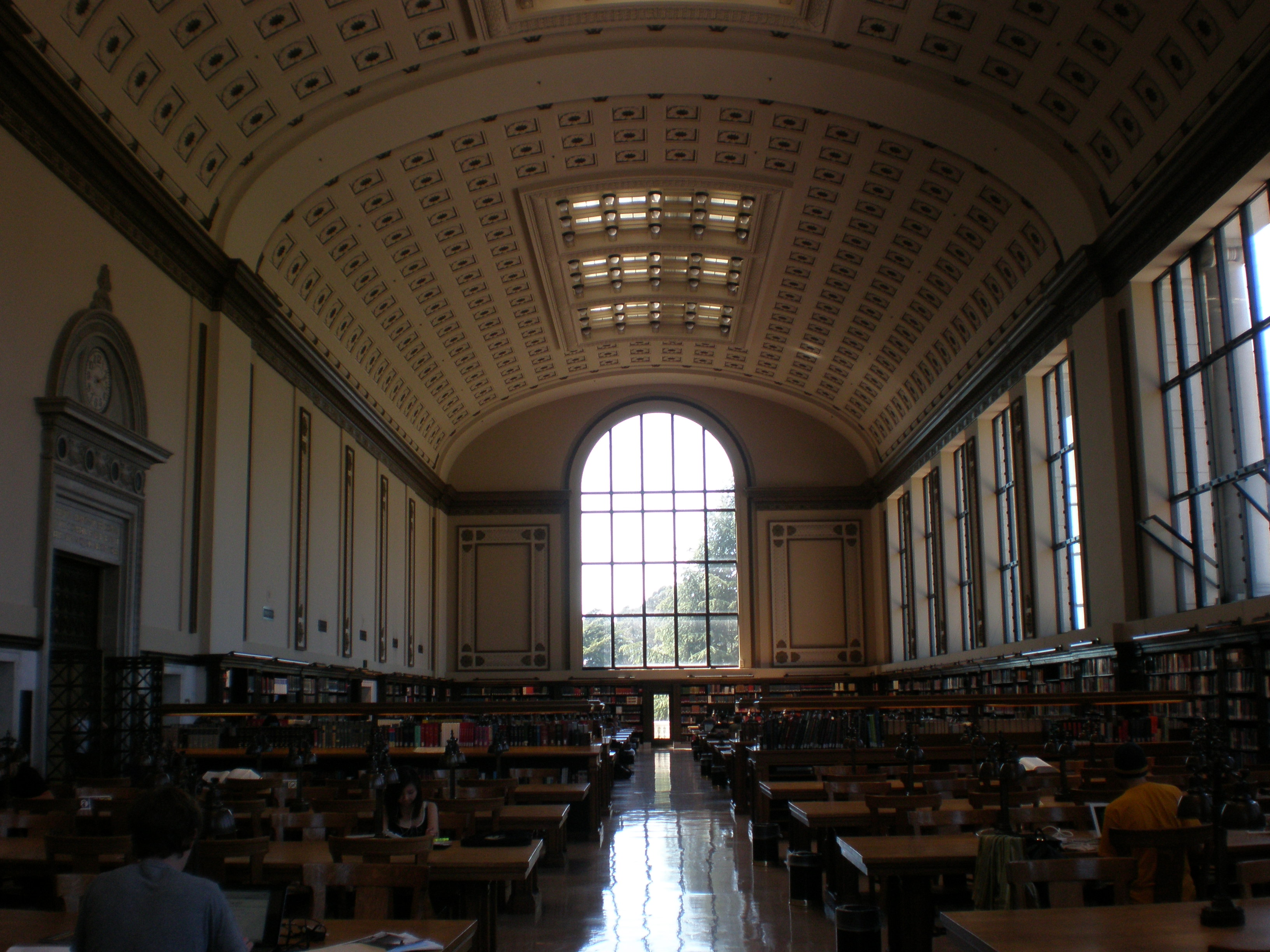
North Reading Room of the Doe Memorial Library, University of California, Berkeley, Berkeley, California, 1904-11.

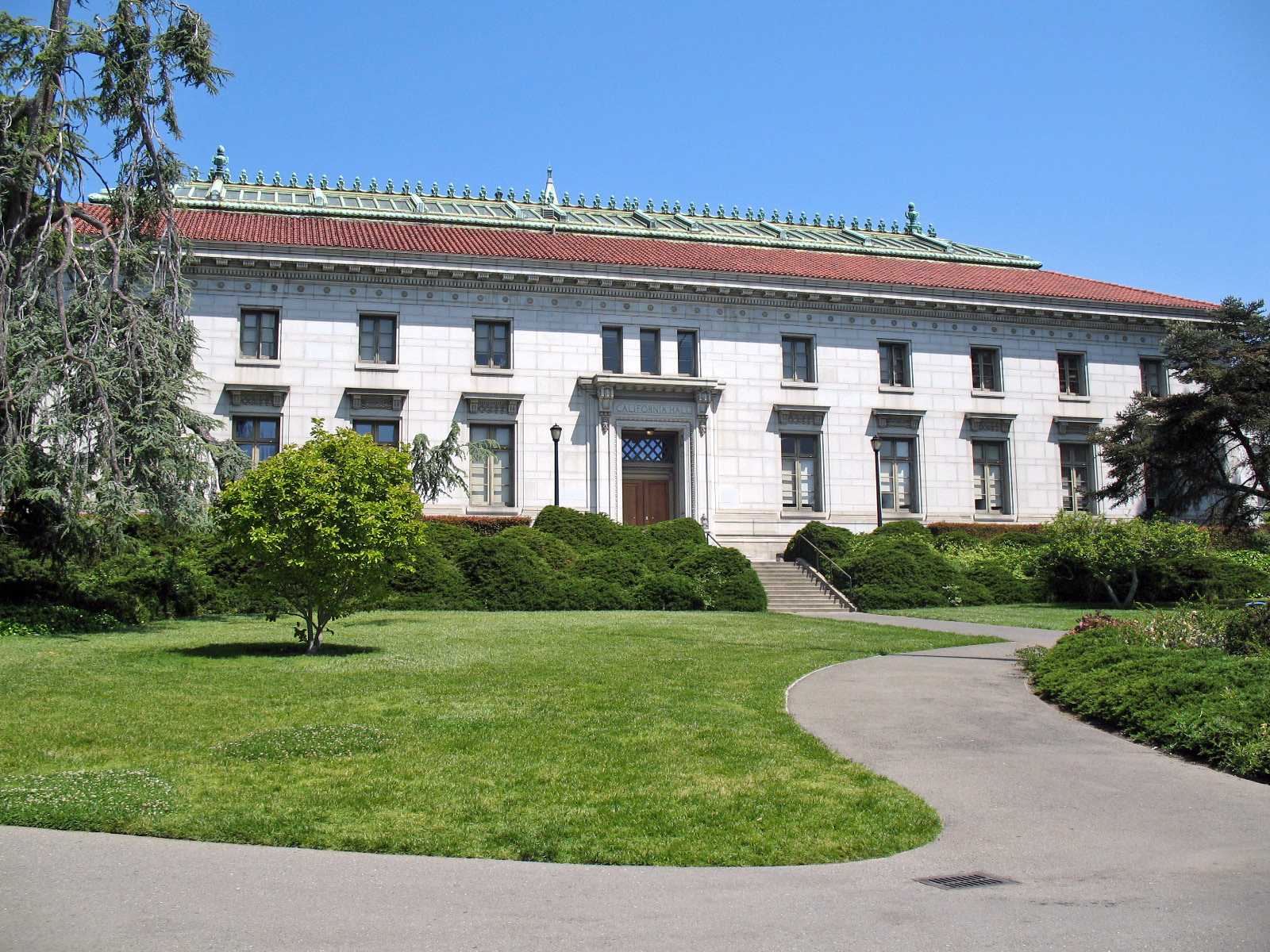
California Hall, University of California, Berkeley, Berkeley, California, 1905.

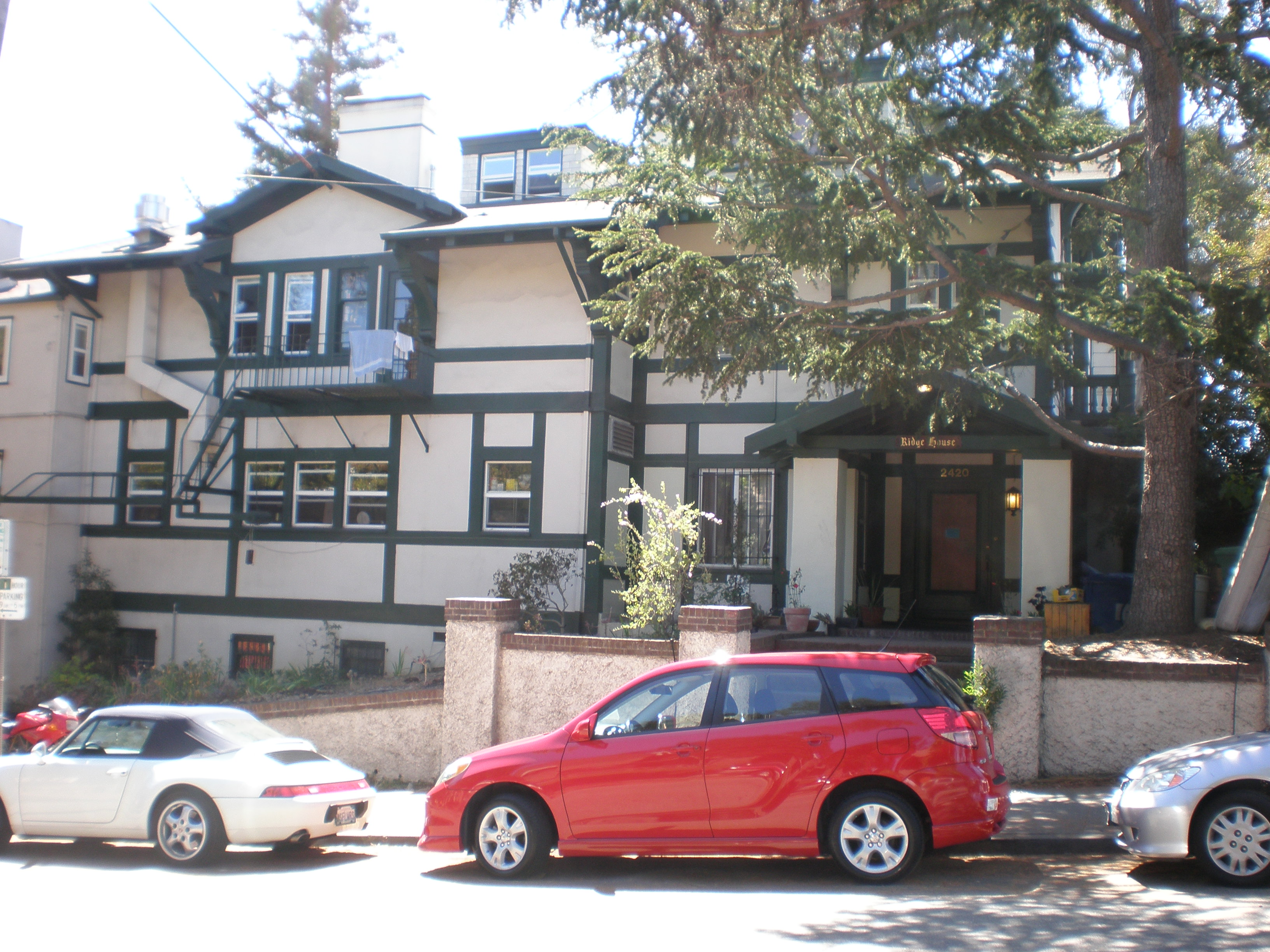
House for Adolph C. Miller, Berkeley, California, 1906.

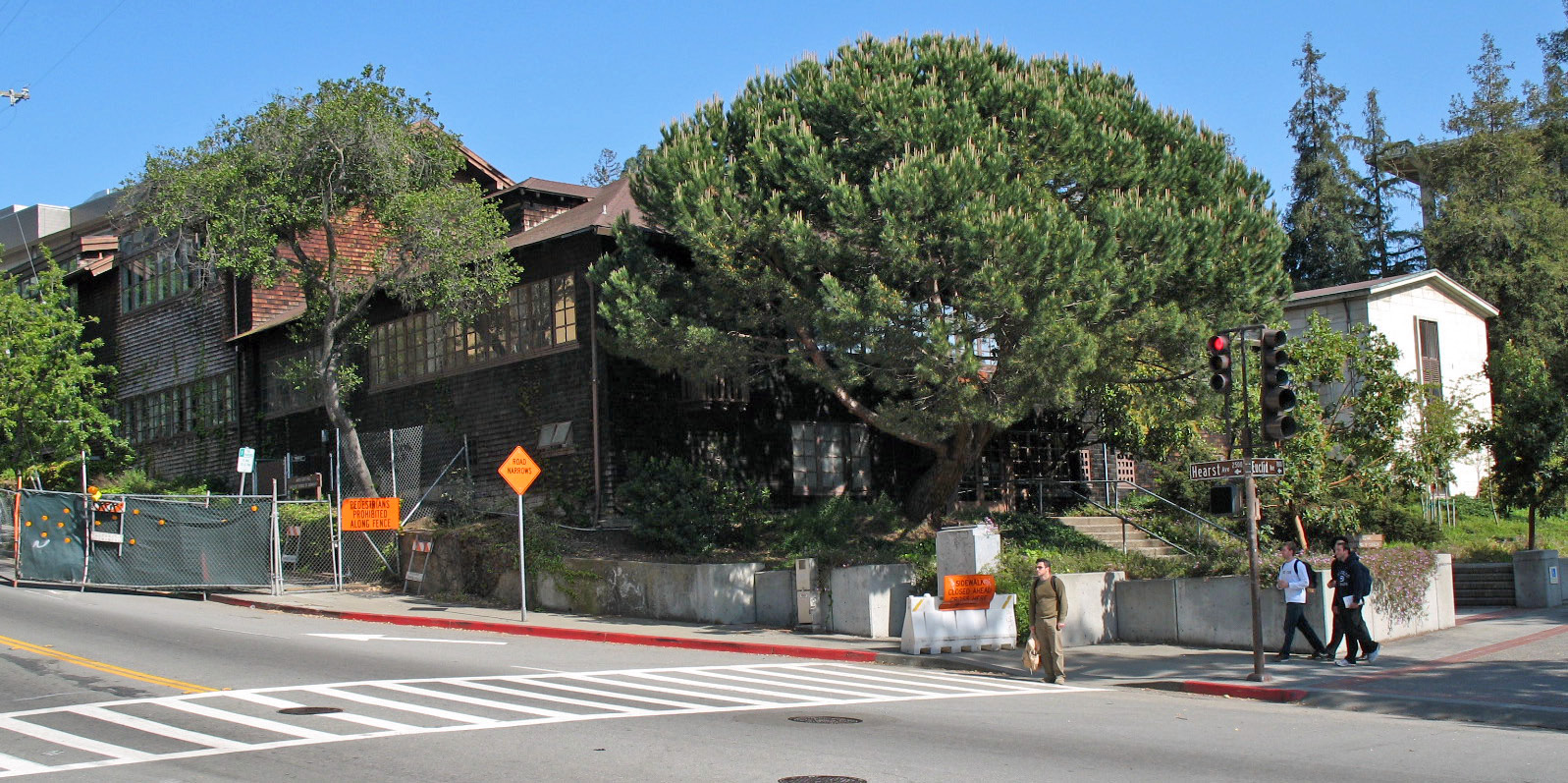
North Gate Hall, University of California, Berkeley, Berkeley, California, 1906.

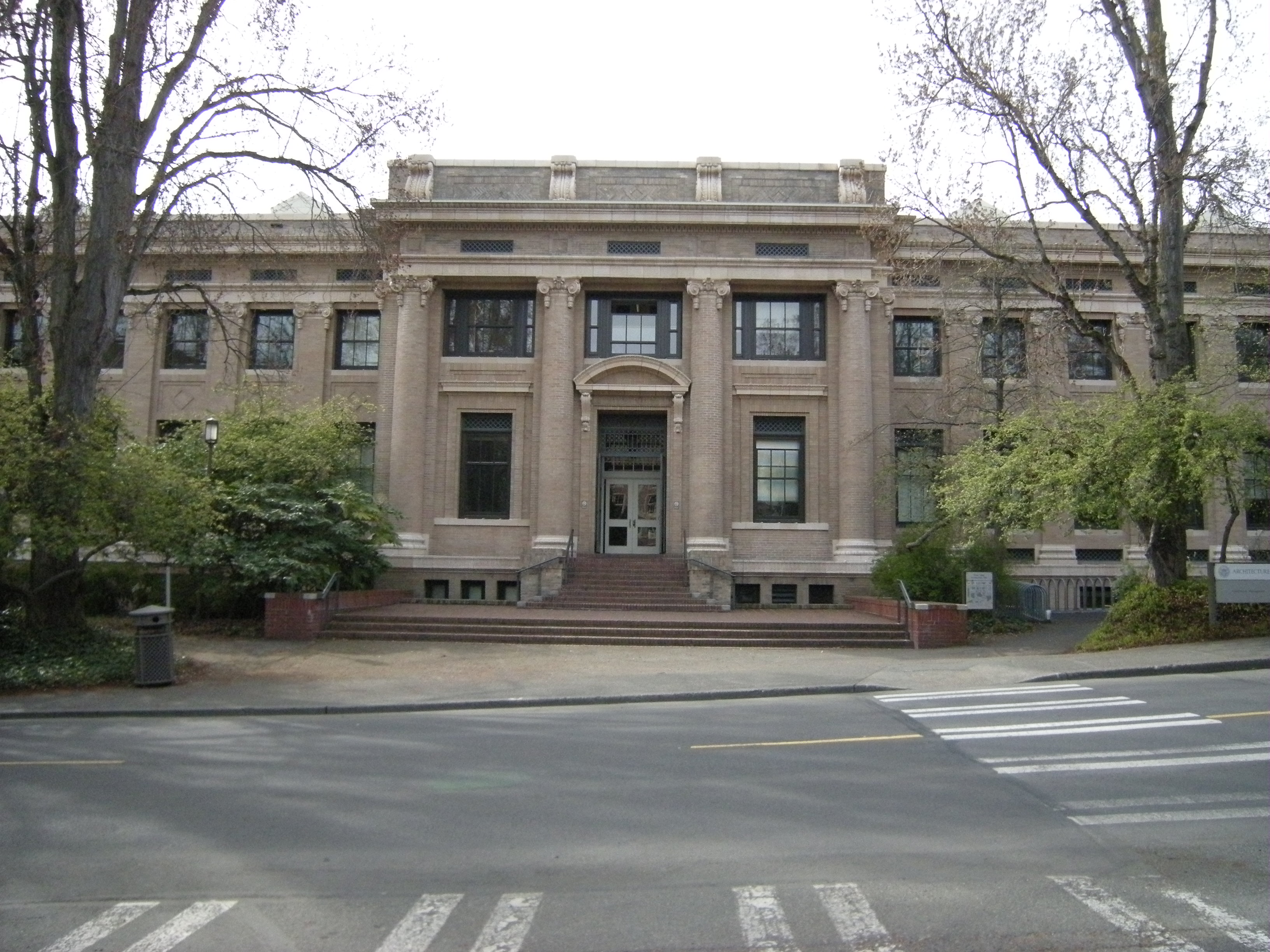
Chemistry (Architecture) Hall, University of Washington, Seattle, Washington, 1907-09.

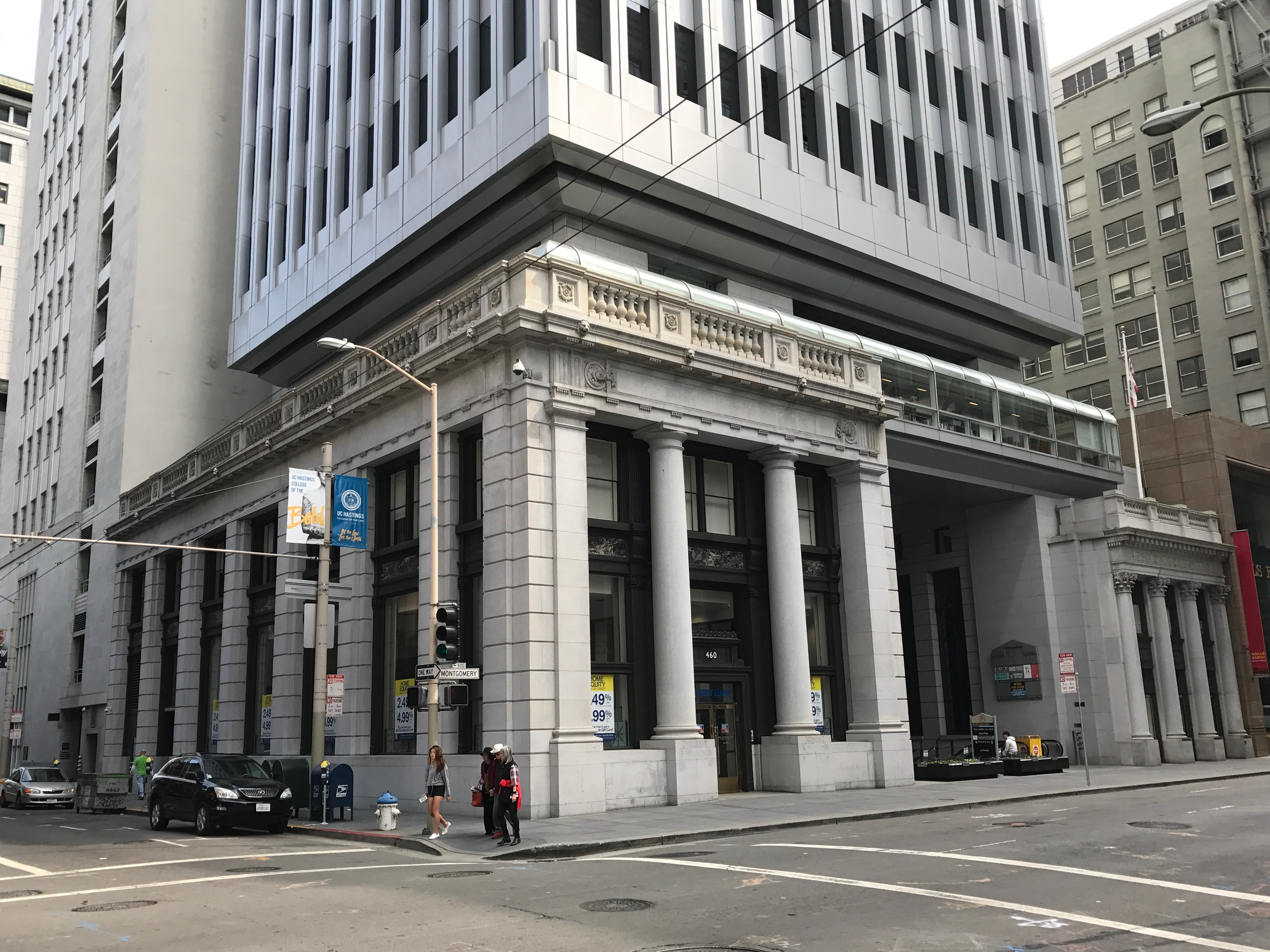
Italian American Bank Building, San Francisco, California, 1907.

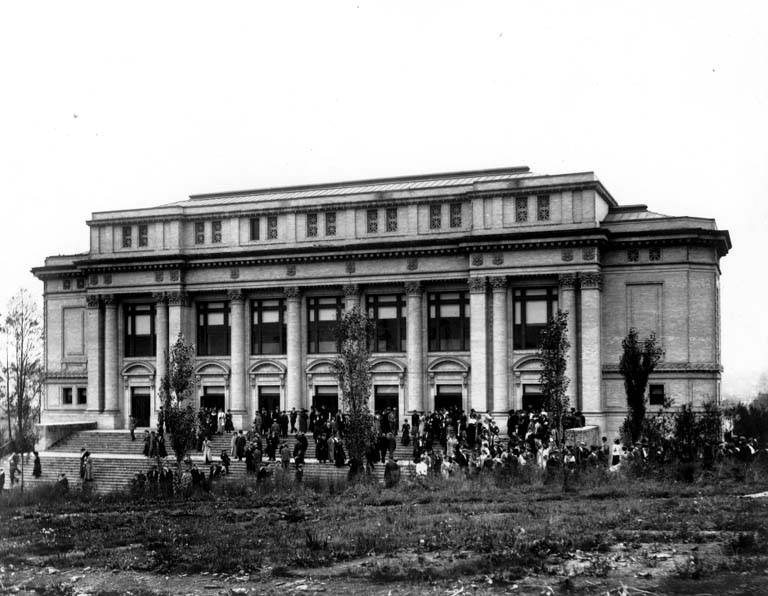
Meany Hall, University of Washington, Seattle, Washington, 1907-09.

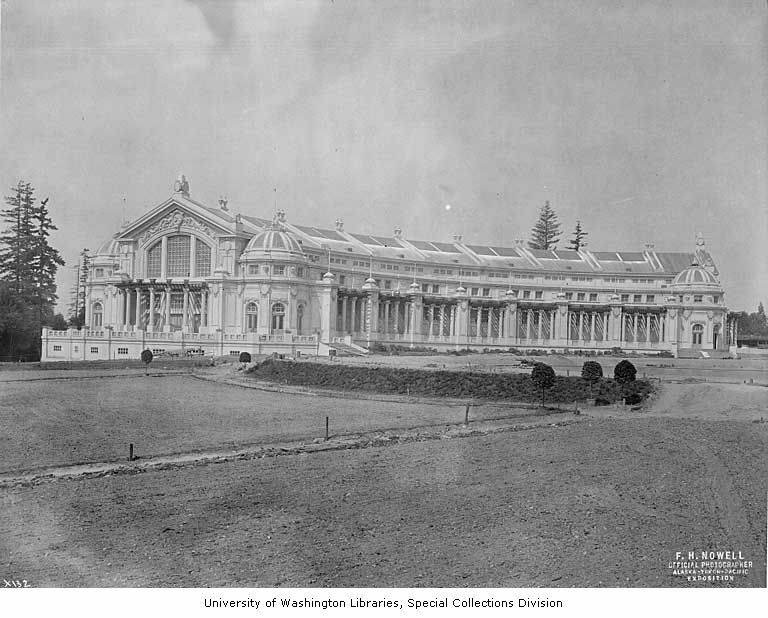
Agriculture Building, Alaska–Yukon–Pacific Exposition, Seattle, Washington, 1908-09.

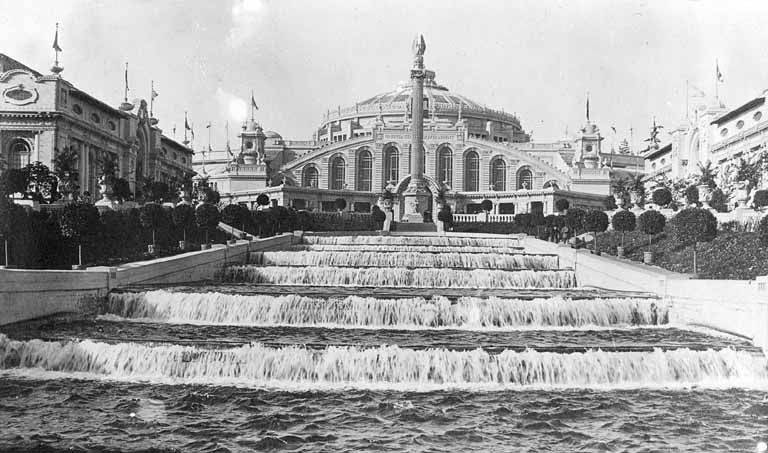
United States Government Building, Alaska–Yukon–Pacific Exposition, Seattle, Washington, 1908-09.

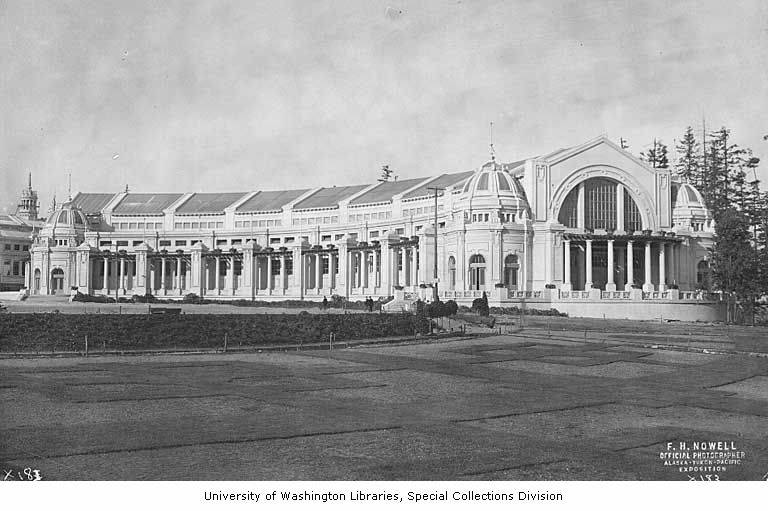
Manufactures Building, Alaska–Yukon–Pacific Exposition, Seattle, Washington, 1908-09.

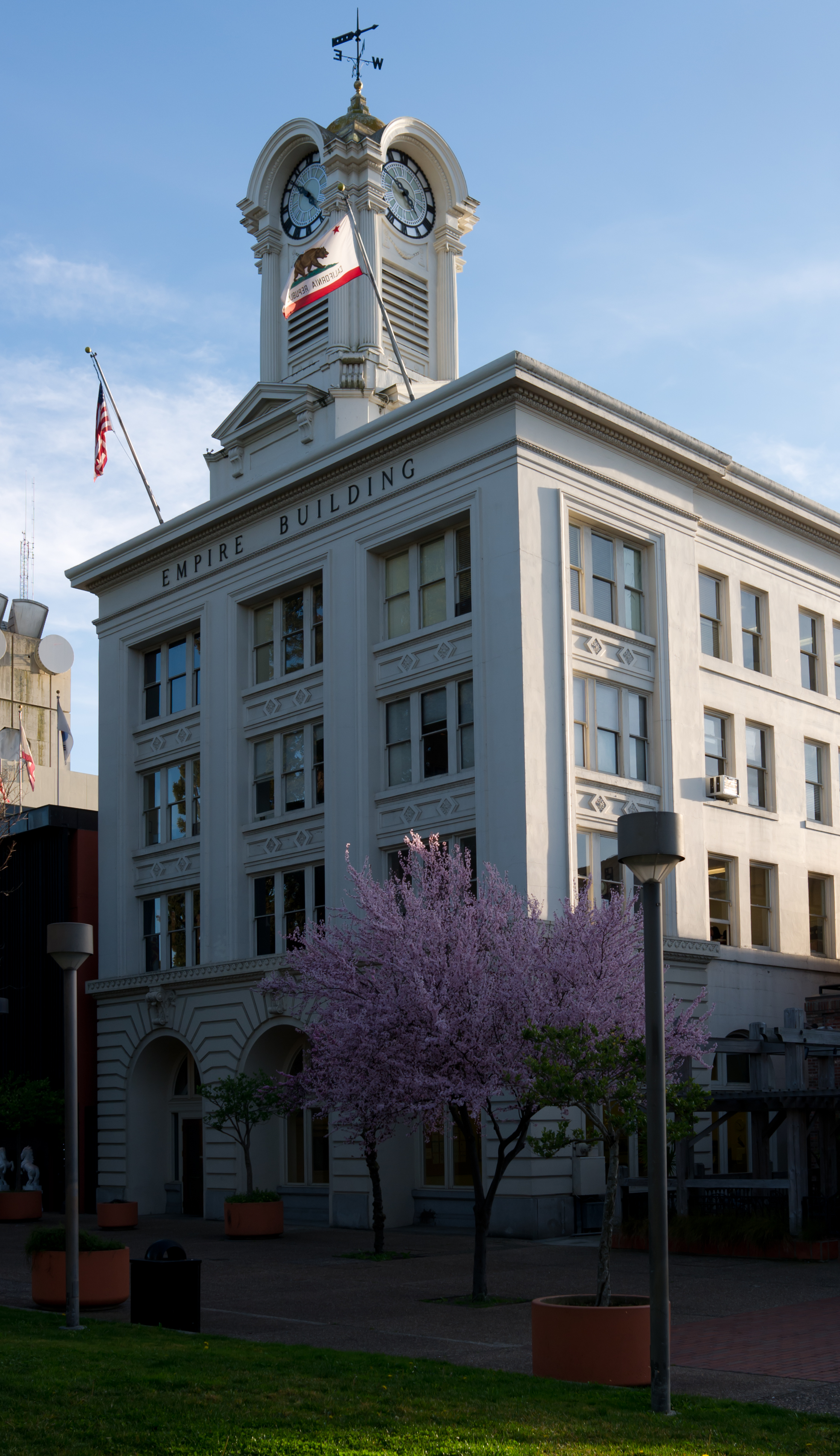
Empire Building, Santa Rosa, California, 1908-10.

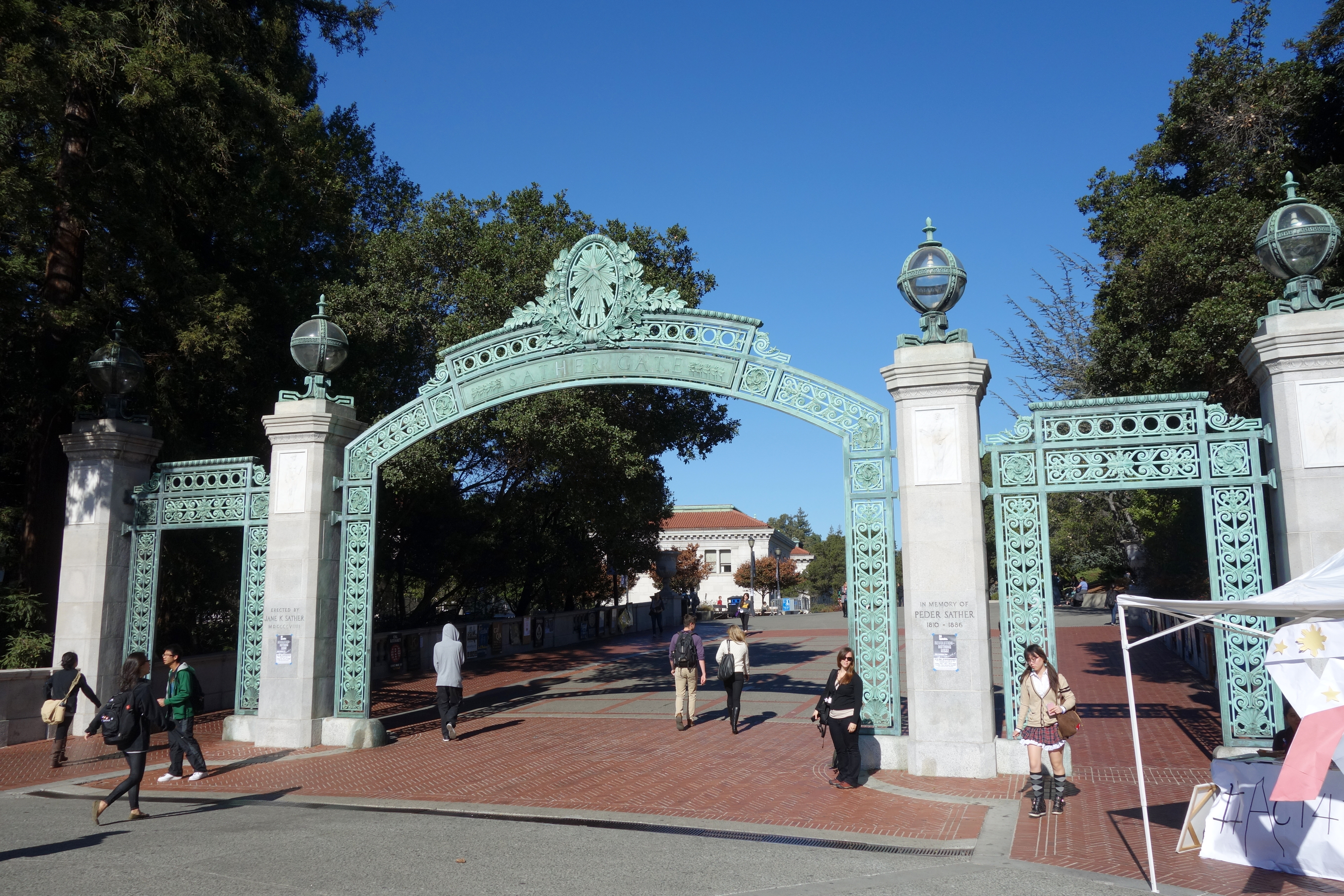
Sather Gate, University of California, Berkeley, Berkeley, California, 1910.

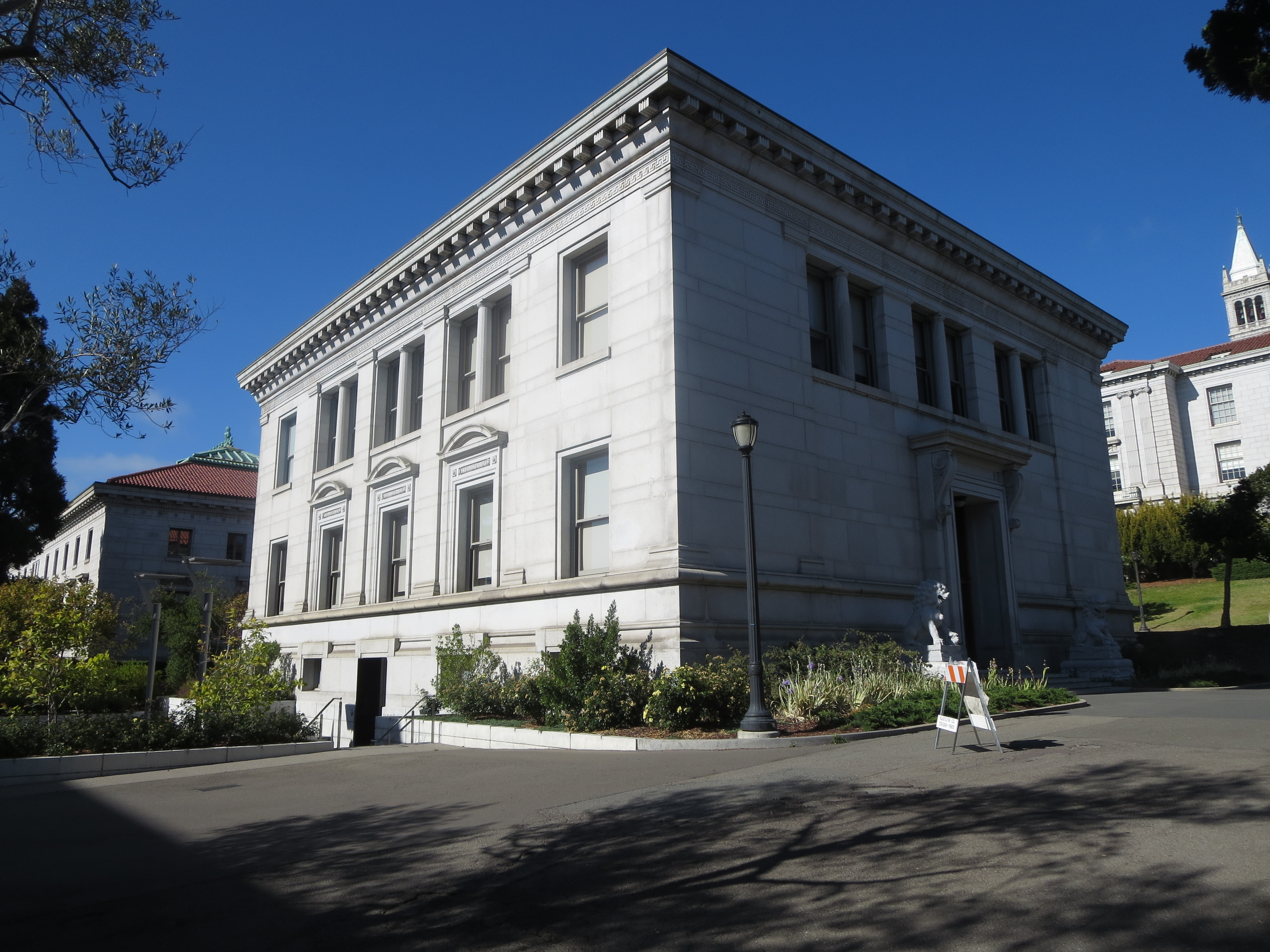
Durant Hall, University of California, Berkeley, Berkeley, California, 1911.

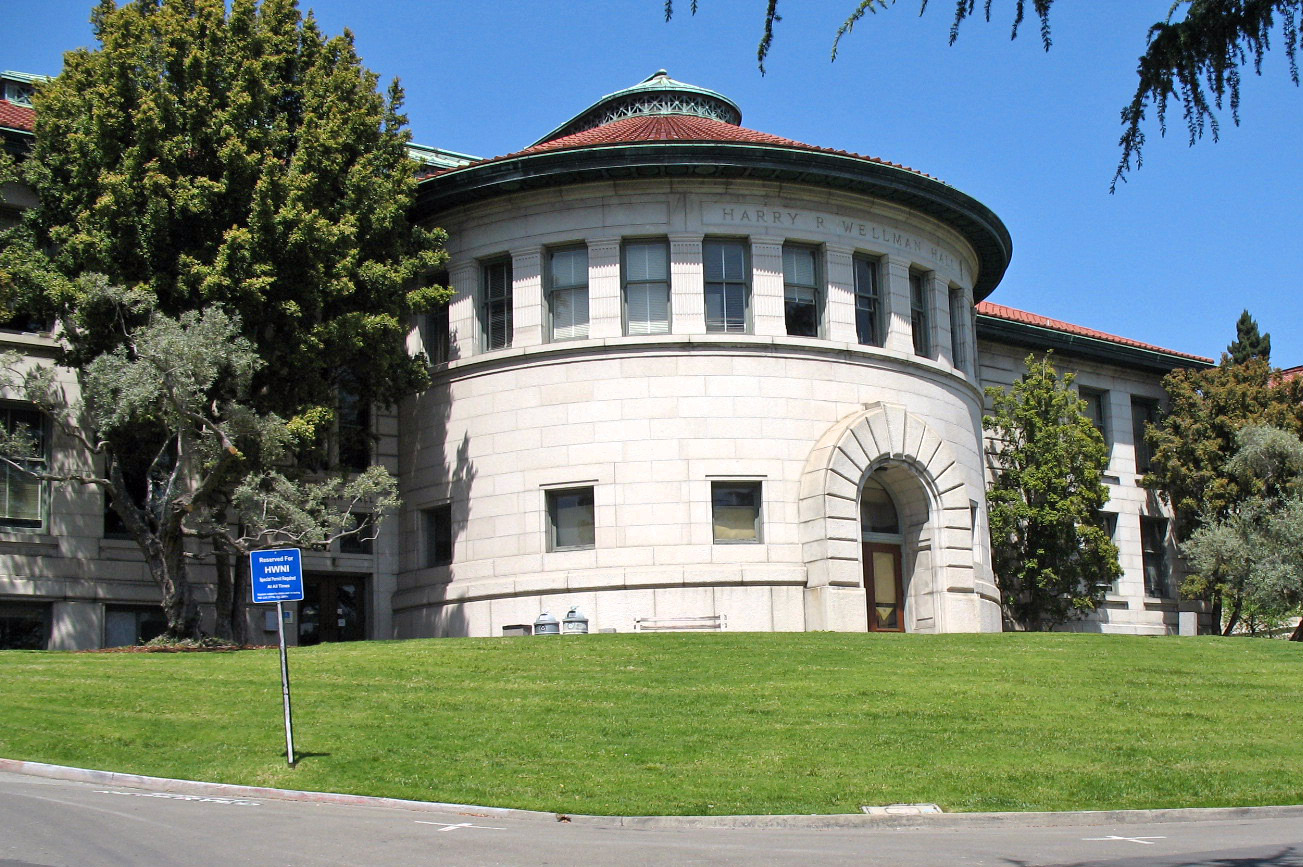
Wellman Hall, University of California, Berkeley, Berkeley, California, 1912.

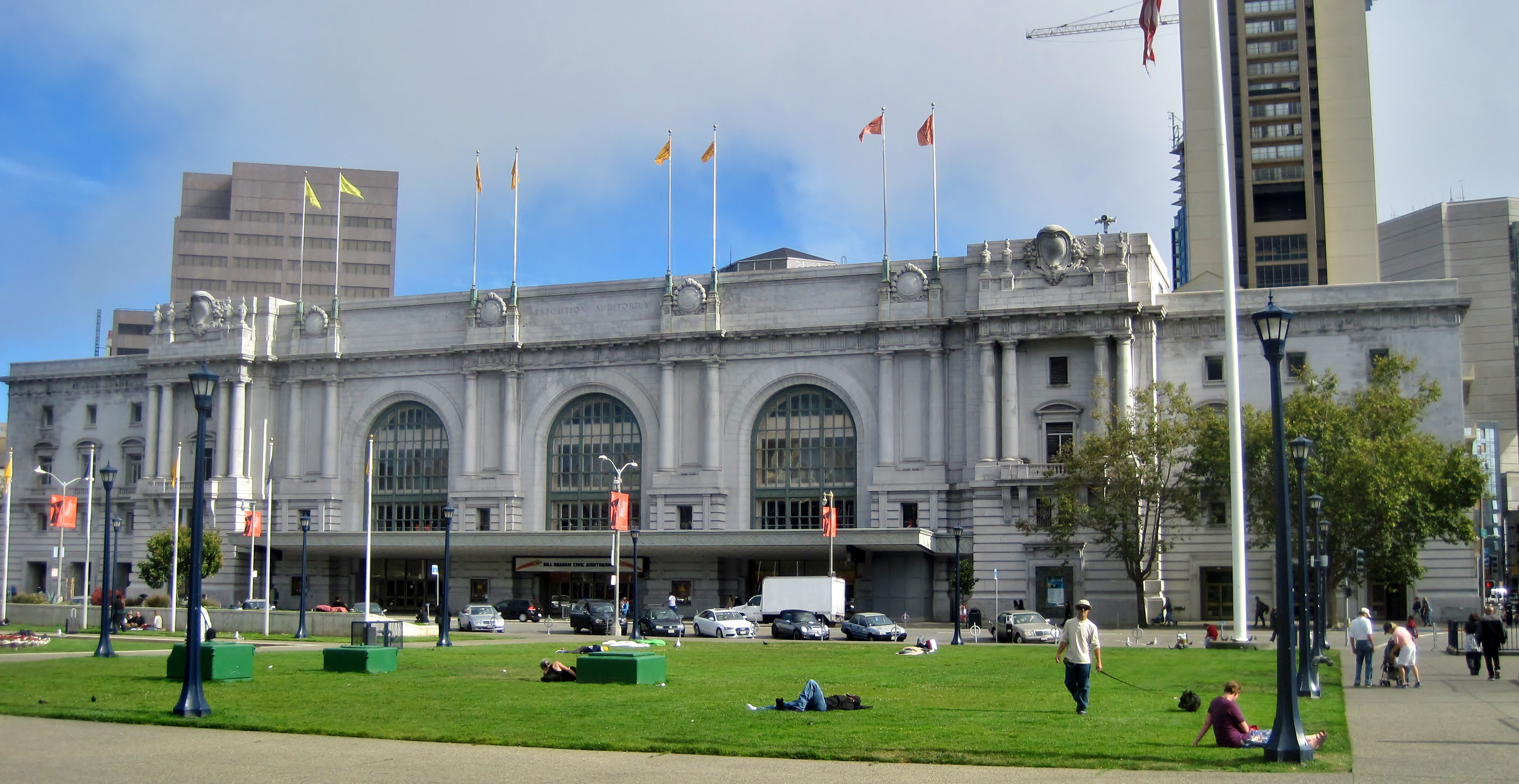
San Francisco Civic Auditorium, San Francisco, California, 1913-15.

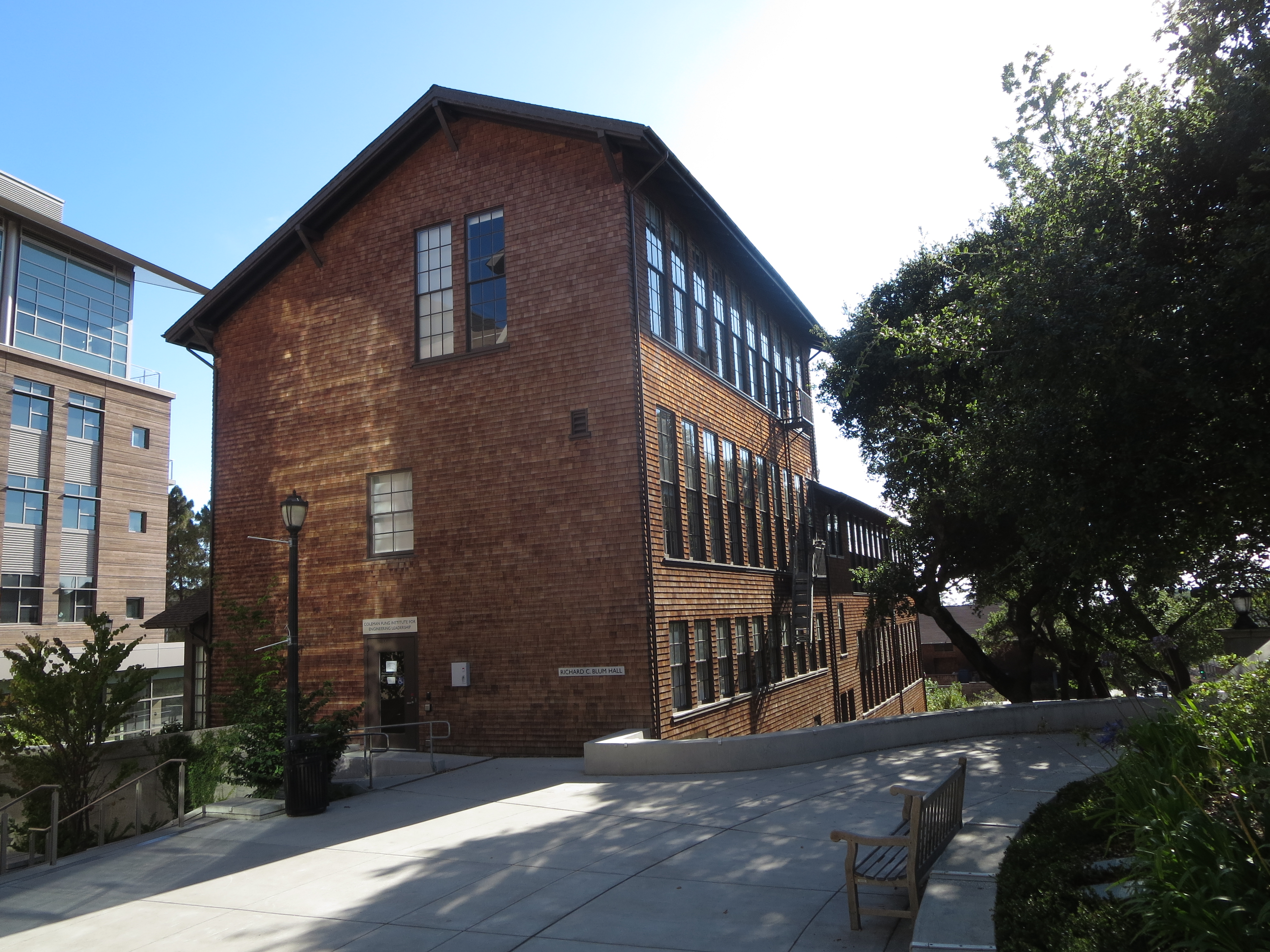
Drawing Building, University of California, Berkeley, Berkeley, California, 1914.

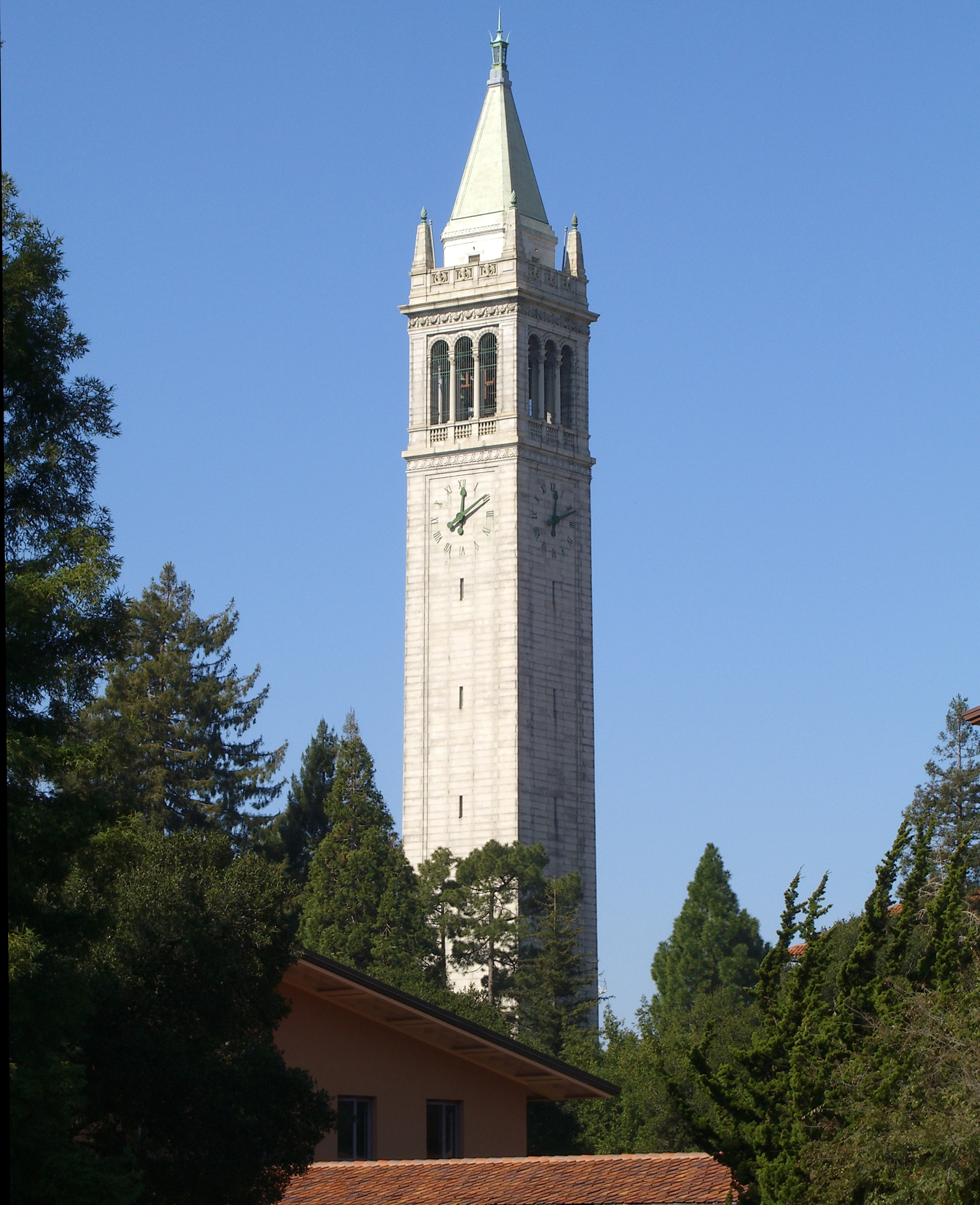
Sather Tower, University of California, Berkeley, Berkeley, California, 1914-15.

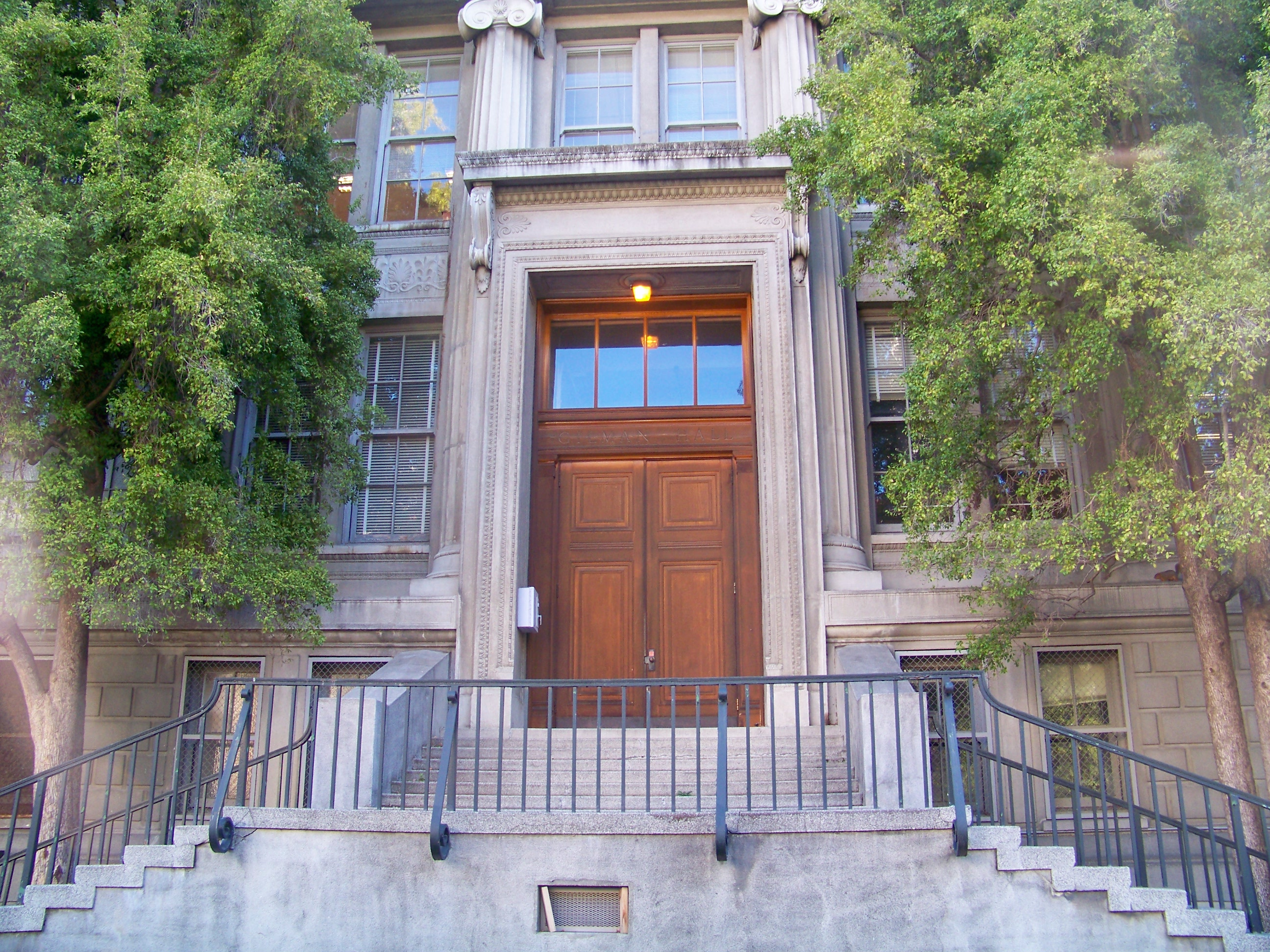
Gilman Hall, University of California, Berkeley, Berkeley, California, 1916-17.

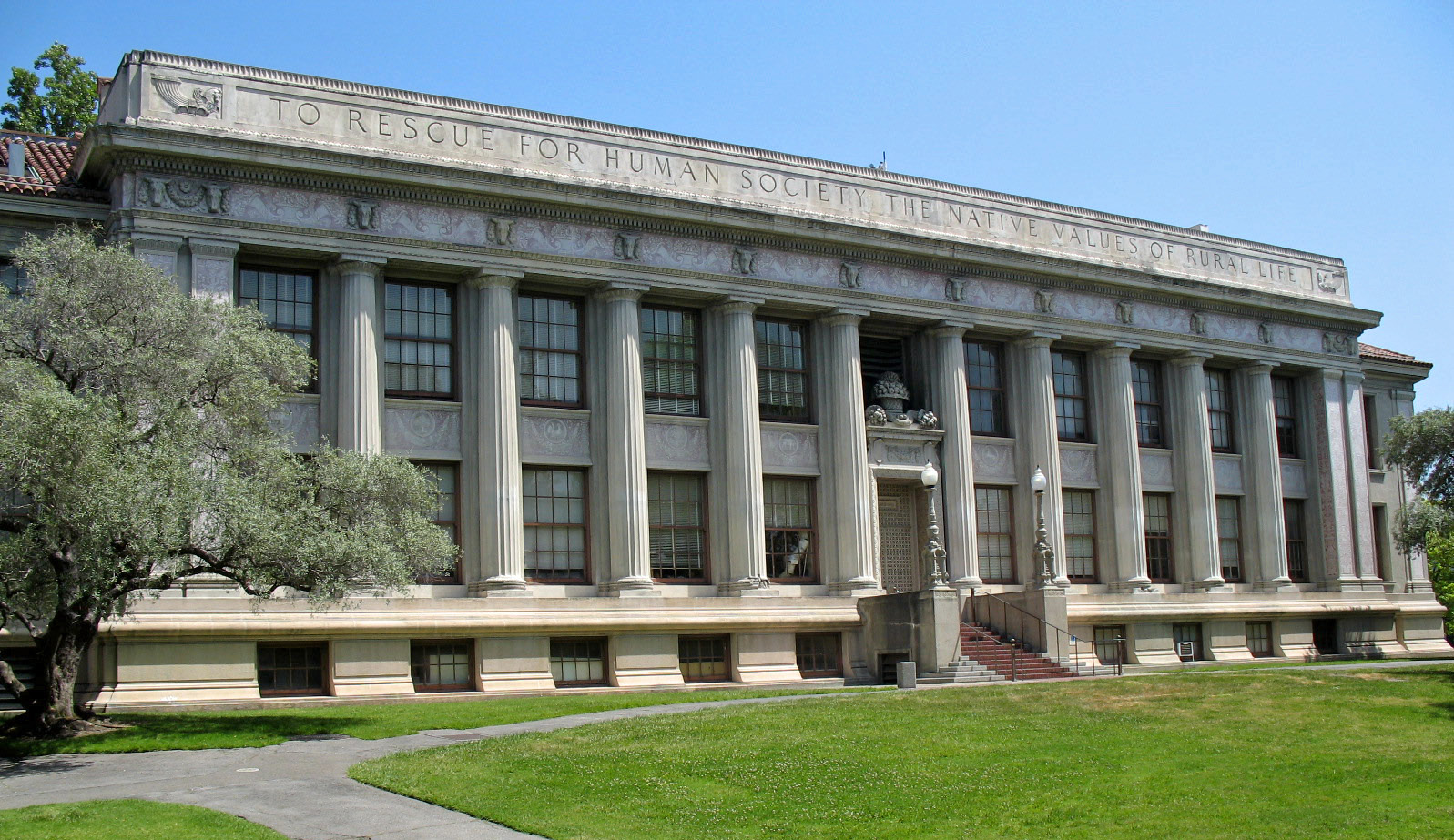
Hilgard Hall, University of California, Berkeley, Berkeley, California, 1917.

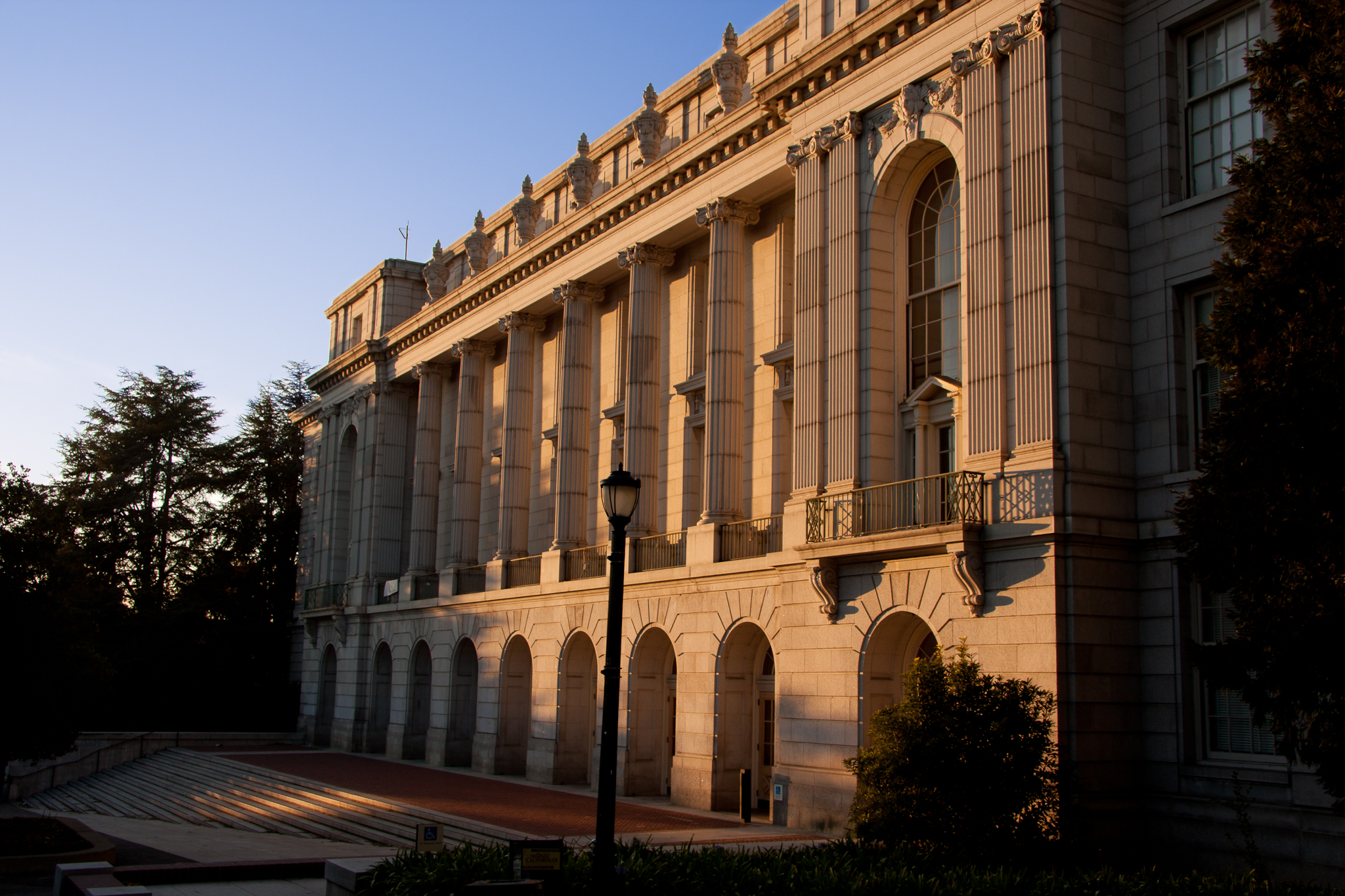
Wheeler Hall, University of California, Berkeley, Berkeley, California, 1917.

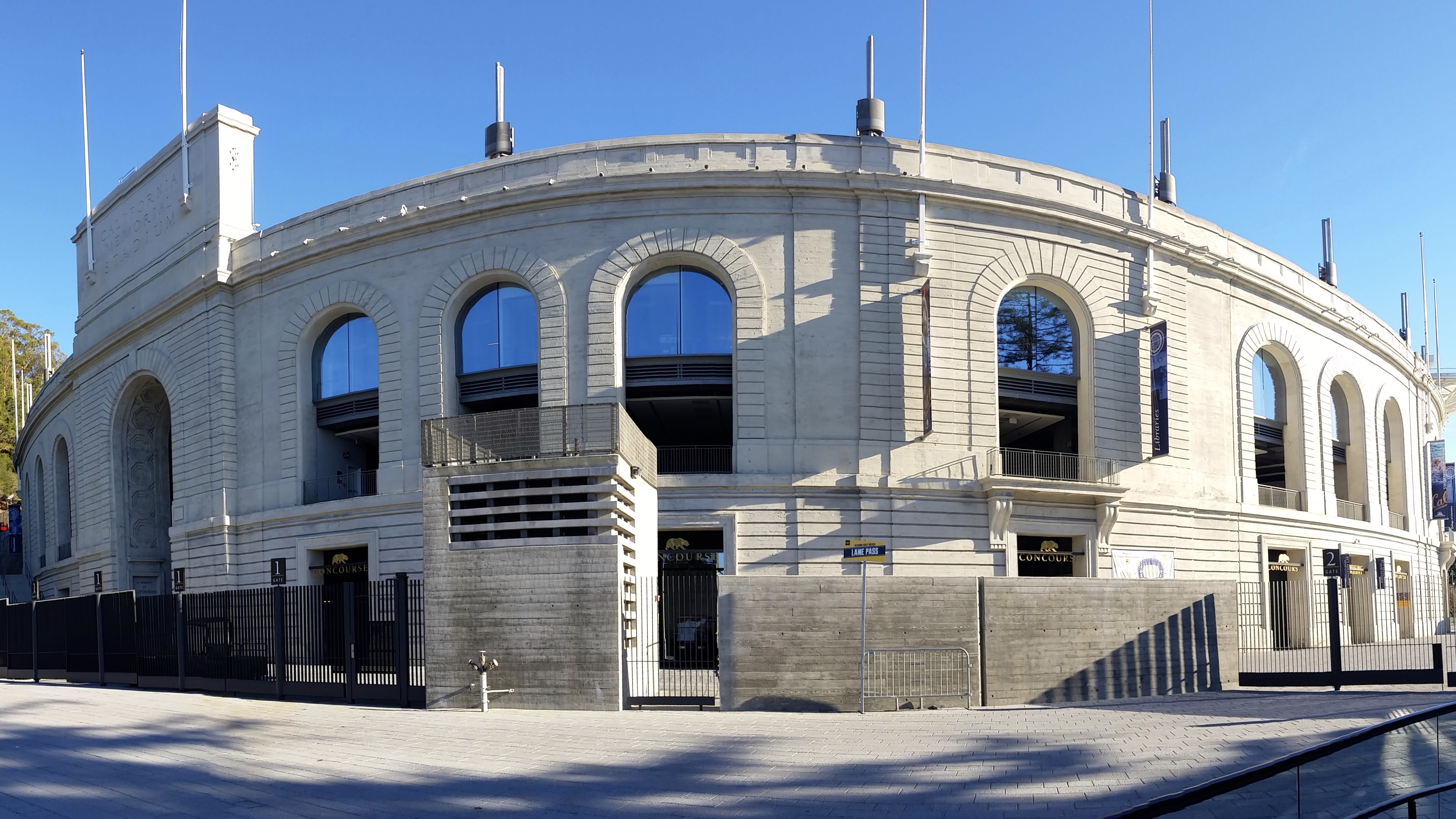
California Memorial Stadium, University of California, Berkeley, Berkeley, California, 1922-23.

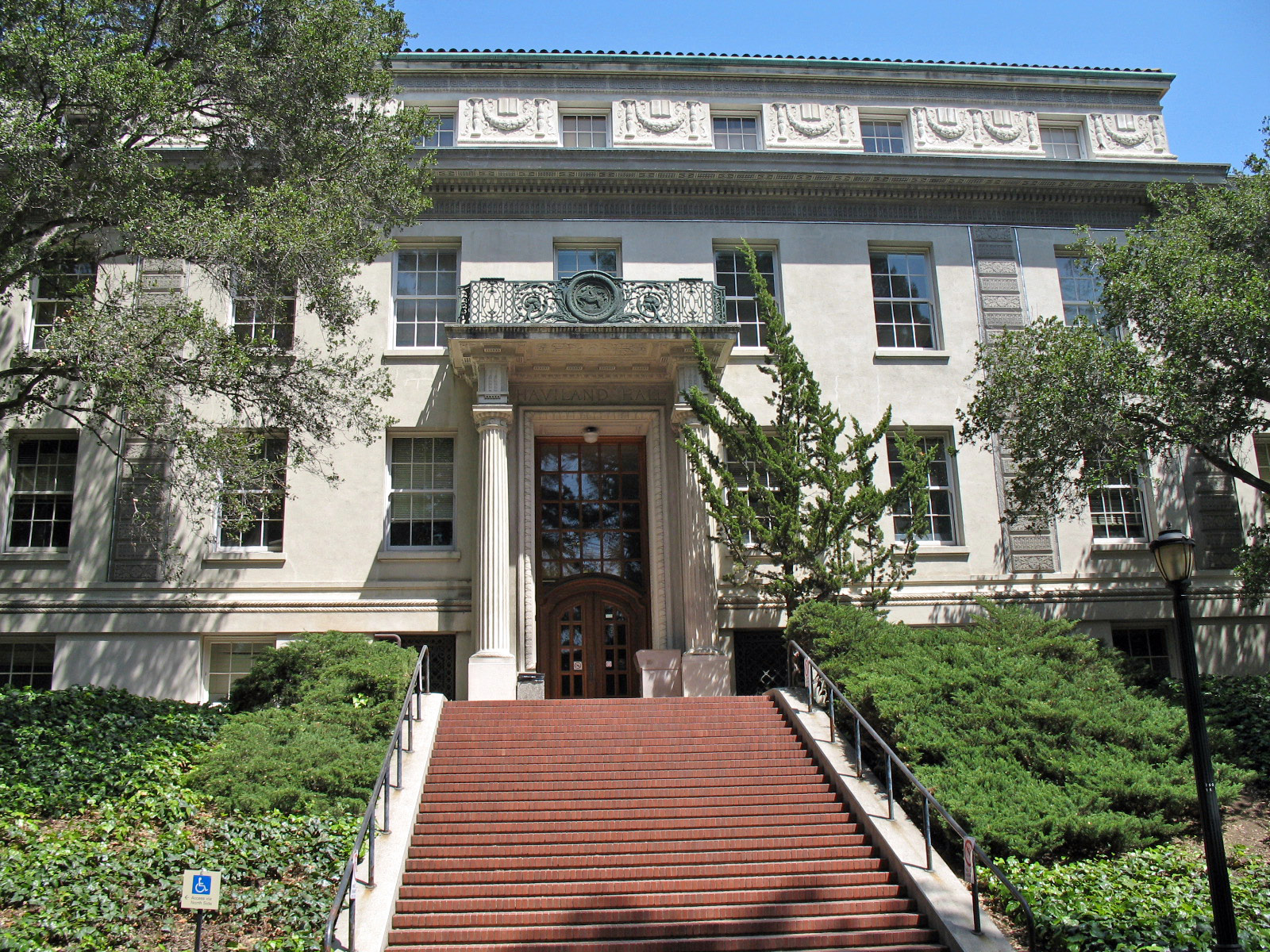
Haviland Hall, University of California, Berkeley, Berkeley, California, 1924.

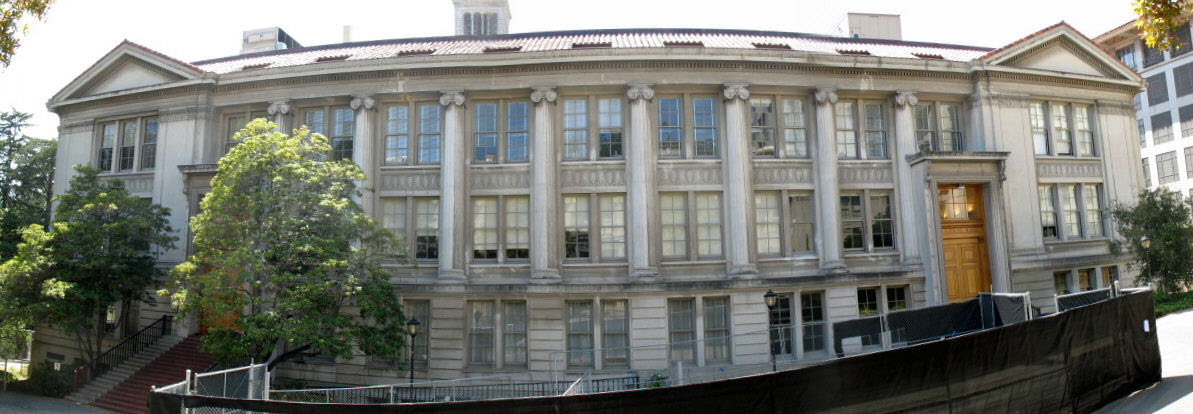
LeConte Hall, University of California, Berkeley, Berkeley, California, 1924.

== See also ==
- Draper, Joan, “The Ecole des Beaux-Arts and the Architectural Profession in the United States: The Case of John Galen Howard,” in The Architect: Chapters in the History of the Profession, Spiro Kostof, ed., Oxford University Press, NY 1977, pages 209-237
- Draper, Joan, “John Galen Howard,” in Toward a Simpler Way of Life: The Arts & Crafts Architects of California, Rober Winter, ed., Norfleet Press of University of California Press, Berkeley Los Angeles London 1997, pages 31–40
- Partridge, Loren W. John Galen Howard and the Berkeley Campus: Beaux-Arts Architecture in the “Athens of the West”, Berkeley Architectural Heritage, Berkeley CA 1988
