= Bridging Communities, Connecting Library Services =

Consortium of New Jersey public libraries

- Location: Northeastern New Jersey
- Established: 1979
- Branches: 79

Collection
- Size: 5 million

Access and use
- Circulation: 12 million (2018)
- Population served: 1.2 million
- Members: 670,000

Other information
- Website: bccls.org

The Bridging Communities, Connecting Library Services (formerly known as Bergen County Cooperative Library System) (BCCLS, pronounced "buckles") is a consortium of public libraries in the four northeastern New Jersey Gateway Region counties of Bergen, Hudson, Passaic, and Essex. Founded on October 1, 1979, the organization allows for reciprocal borrowing among its members so that books, audiobooks, CDs, DVDs and other media are shared among the libraries cooperatively. Those with a valid library card from participating towns are permitted to reserve materials online and have them transferred to their local library, where materials can be retrieved.

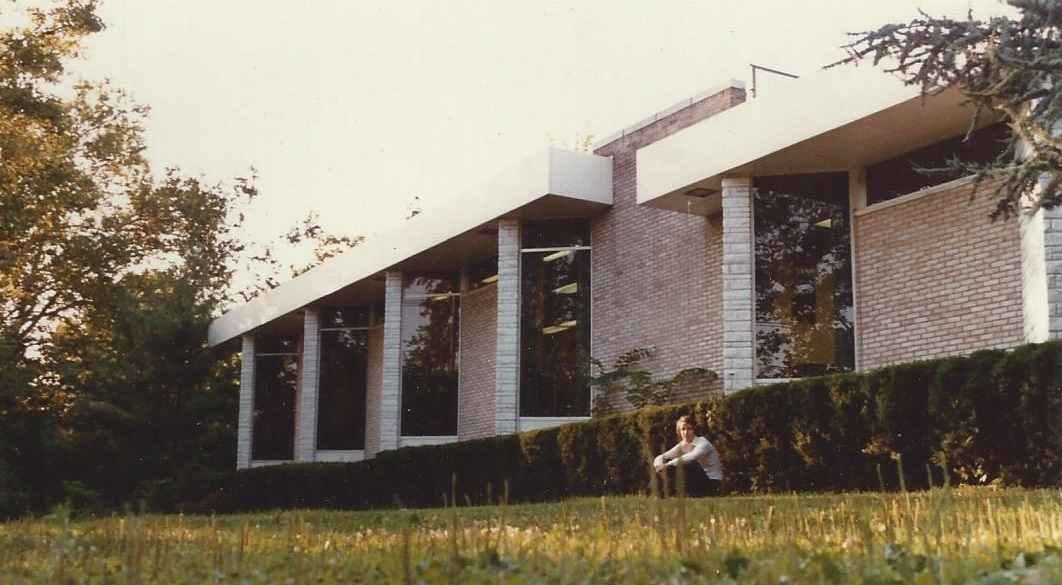
The Leonia Public Library, as seen in 1980

As of 2026, there are 79 public libraries participating in the consortium. All 62 of Bergen County's public libraries are members of BCCLS, along with 16 library systems from other counties with 11 in Essex, 5 in Hudson, and one in Passaic County. A patron's hometown library card is honored at all participating libraries. The BCCLS had also participated in the Open Borrowing (www.openborrowing.org) program, with participating libraries in Middlesex, Morris, Passaic, Sussex and Warren counties; this participation ended on January 1, 2015.

== Locations ==
| Name | Address | County | Website |
|---|---|---|---|
| Allendale's Lee Memorial Library | 500 West Crescent Avenue, Allendale | Bergen | https://leememoriallibrary.org/ |
| Bayonne Public Library | 697 Avenue C, Bayonne | Hudson | https://www.bayonnelibrary.org/ |
| Bergenfield Public Library | 50 West Clinton Avenue, Bergenfield | Bergen | https://www.bergenfieldlibrary.org/ |
| Bloomfield Public Library | 90 Broad Street, Bloomfield | Essex | https://www.bplnj.org/ |
| Bogota Public Library | 375 Larch Avenue, Bogota | Bergen | http://www.bogotapubliclibrary.org/ |
| Carlstadt's William E. Dermody Library | 420 Hackensack Street, Carlstadt | Bergen | https://www.carlstadtlibrary.org/ |
| Cliffside Park Public Library | 505 Palisade Avenue, Cliffside Park | Bergen | https://cliffsideparklibrary.org/ |
| Closter Public Library | 280 High Street, Closter | Bergen | https://closterpubliclibrary.org/ |
| Cresskill Public Library | 53 Union Avenue, Cresskill | Bergen | https://www.cresskilllibrary.org/ |
| Demarest Public Library | 90 Hardenburgh Avenue, Demarest | Bergen | https://www.demarestlibrary.org/ |
| Dumont's Dixon Homestead Library | 180 Washington Avenue, Dumont | Bergen | https://www.dumontlibrary.org/ |
| East Rutherford Memorial Library | 143 Boiling Springs Avenue, East Rutherford | Bergen | http://eastrutherford.bccls.org/ |
| Edgewater Public Library | 49 Hudson Avenue, Edgewater | Bergen | https://edgewaterlibrary.org/ |
| Elmwood Park's Richard A. Mola Public Library | 210 Lee Street, Elmwood Park | Bergen | http://elmwoodpark.bccls.org/ |
| Emerson Public Library | 20 Palisade Avenue, Emerson | Bergen | https://emersonlibrary.org/wp/ |
| Englewood Public Library | 31 Engle Street, Englewood | Bergen | https://www.englewoodlibrary.org/ |
| Fair Lawn's Maurice M. Pine Library | 10-01 Fair Lawn Avenue, Fair Lawn | Bergen | https://www.fairlawnlibrary.org/ |
| Fairview Public Library | 213 Anderson Avenue, Fairview | Bergen | http://fairview.bccls.org/ |
| Fort Lee Free Public Library | 320 Main Street, Fort Lee | Bergen | https://fortleelibrary.org/ |
| Franklin Lakes Public Library | 470 De Korte Drive, Franklin Lakes | Bergen | https://www.franklinlakeslibrary.org/ |
| Garfield Public Library | 500 Midland Avenue, Garfield | Bergen | https://garfield.bccls.org/ |
| Glen Ridge Free Public Library | 240 Ridgewood Avenue, Glen Ridge | Essex | https://www.glenridgelibrary.org/ |
| Glen Rock Public Library | 315 Rock Road, Glen Rock | Bergen | https://www.glenrocklibrary.org/ |
| Guttenberg Resource Center | 7002 Boulevard East, Guttenberg | Hudson | http://nbpl.org/ |
| Hackensack's Johnson Free Public Library | 274 Main Street, Hackensack | Bergen | http://johnsonlib.org/ |
| Harrington Park Public Library | 10 Herring Street, Harrington Park | Bergen | http://www.harringtonpark.bccls.org/ |
| Hasbrouck Heights Free Public Library | 320 Boulevard, Hasbrouck Heights | Bergen | https://www.hasbrouckheightslibrary.org/ |
| Haworth Municipal Library | 300 Haworth Avenue, Haworth | Bergen | https://www.haworthlibrary.org/ |
| Hawthorne's Louis Bay 2nd Public Library | 345 Lafayette Avenue, Hawthorne | Passaic | https://hawthorne.bccls.org/ |
| Hillsdale Free Public Library | 509 Hillsdale Avenue, Hillsdale | Bergen | https://myhillsdalelibrary.org/ |
| Ho-Ho-Kus's Worth-Pinkham Memorial Library | 91 Warren Avenue, Ho-Ho-Kus | Bergen | https://hohokus.bccls.org/ |
| Hoboken Public Library | 500 Park Avenue, Hoboken | Hudson | https://hobokenlibrary.org/ |
| Leonia Public Library | 227 Fort Lee Road, Leonia | Bergen | https://leonialibrary.org/ |
| Little Ferry Public Library | 239 Liberty Street, Little Ferry | Bergen | http://littleferry.bccls.org/ |
| Livingston Public Library | 10 Robert Harp Drive, Livingston | Essex | https://www.livingstonlibrary.org/ |
| Lodi Memorial Library | 1 Memorial Drive, Lodi | Bergen | http://lodi.bccls.org/ |
| Lyndhurst Public Library | 355 Valley Brook Avenue, Lyndhurst | Bergen | http://www.lyndhurstlibrary.org/ |
| Mahwah Public Library | 100 Ridge Road, Mahwah | Bergen | https://www.mahwahlibrary.org/ |
| Maplewood Memorial Library | 51 Baker Street, Maplewood | Essex | https://www.maplewoodlibrary.org/ |
| Maplewood Hilton Branch Library | 1688 Springfield Avenue, Maplewood | Essex | https://www.maplewoodlibrary.org/ |
| Maywood Public Library | 459 Maywood Avenue, Maywood | Bergen | https://maywoodpubliclibrary.com |
| Midland Park Memorial Library | 250 Godwin Avenue, Midland Park | Bergen | https://www.midlandparklibrary.org/ |
| Millburn Free Public Library | 200 Glen Avenue, Millburn | Essex | http://www.millburnlibrary.org/ |
| Montclair Public Library | 50 South Fullerton Avenue, Montclair | Essex | http://www.montclairlibrary.org/ |
| Montclair Bellevue Avenue Branch Library | 185 Bellevue Avenue, Upper Montclair | Essex | http://www.montclairlibrary.org/ |
| Montvale Public Library | 12 Mercedes Drive, Montvale | Bergen | http://montvale.bccls.org/ |
| New Milford Public Library | 200 Dahlia Avenue, New Milford | Bergen | http://www.newmilford.njlibraries.org/ |
| North Arlington Public Library | 210 Ridge Road, North Arlington | Bergen | https://northarlington.bccls.org/ |
| North Bergen's Sai Rao Public Library | 8411 Bergenline Avenue, North Bergen | Hudson | http://www.nbpl.org/ |
| North Bergen Kennedy Branch Library | 2123 Kennedy Boulevard, North Bergen | Hudson | http://www.nbpl.org/ |
| Northvale Public Library | 116 Paris Avenue, Northvale | Bergen | https://www.northvalelibrary.org/ |
| Norwood Public Library | 198 Summit Street, Norwood | Bergen | https://nplnj.org/ |
| Nutley Free Public Library | 93 Booth Drive, Nutley | Essex | https://nutleypubliclibrary.org/ |
| Oakland Public Library | 2 Municipal Plaza, Oakland | Bergen | http://www.oaklandnjlibrary.org/ |
| Old Tappan Public Library | 56 Russell Avenue, Old Tappan | Bergen | https://www.oldtappanlibrary.com/ |
| Oradell Public Library | 375 Kinderkamack Road, Oradell | Bergen | https://oradell.bccls.org/ |
| Palisades Park Public Library | 257 Second Street, Palisades Park | Bergen | https://www.palparklibrary.org/ |
| Paramus Public Library | East 116 Century Road, Paramus | Bergen | https://paramuslibrary.org/ |
| Paramus Charles E. Reid Branch Library | 239 West Midland Avenue, Paramus | Bergen | https://paramuslibrary.org/ |
| Park Ridge Public Library | 51 Park Avenue, Park Ridge | Bergen | https://parkridge.bccls.org/ |
| Ramsey Free Public Library | 30 Wyckoff Avenue, Ramsey | Bergen | http://www.ramseylibrary.org/ |
| Ridgefield Free Public Library | 527 Morse Avenue, Ridgefield | Bergen | https://www.ridgefieldpubliclibrary.com/ |
| Ridgefield Park Public Library | 107 Cedar Street, Ridgefield Park | Bergen | https://www.ridgefieldparkpubliclibrary.org/ |
| Ridgewood Public Library | 125 North Maple Avenue, Ridgewood | Bergen | https://www.ridgewoodlibrary.org/ |
| River Edge Public Library | 685 Elm Avenue, River Edge | Bergen | https://www.riveredgepubliclibrary.org/ |
| River Vale Free Public Library | 412 Rivervale Road, River Vale | Bergen | https://www.rivervalelibrary.org/ |
| Rochelle Park Free Public Library | 151 W. Passaic Street, Rochelle Park | Bergen | http://www.rplibrary.org/ |
| Roseland Free Public Library | 20 Roseland Avenue, Roseland | Essex | http://roselandpubliclibrary.org/rfp/ |
| Rutherford Free Public Library | 150 Park Avenue, Rutherford | Bergen | https://www.rutherfordlibrary.org/ |
| Saddle Brook Public Library | 340 Mayhill Street, Saddle Brook | Bergen | https://saddlebrook.bccls.org/ |
| Secaucus Public Library | 1379 Paterson Plank Road, Secaucus | Hudson | https://www.secaucuslibrary.org/ |
| Secaucus Public Library - Katherine A. Steffens Branch | 1007 Riverside Station Boulevard, Secaucus | Hudson | https://www.secaucuslibrary.org/ |
| South Orange Public Library | 65 Scotland Road, South Orange | Essex | https://www.sopl.org/ |
| Teaneck Public Library | 840 Teaneck Road, Teaneck | Bergen | https://teanecklibrary.org/ |
| Tenafly Public Library | 100 Riveredge Road, Tenafly | Bergen | https://www.tenaflylibrary.org/ |
| Upper Saddle River Public Library | 245 Lake Street, Upper Saddle River | Bergen | https://uppersaddleriverlibrary.org/ |
| Waldwick Public Library | 19 East Prospect Street, Waldwick | Bergen | http://waldwick.bccls.org/ |
| Wallington's John F. Kennedy Memorial Library | 92 Hathaway Street, Wallington | Bergen | https://wallington.bccls.org/ |
| Washington Township Public Library | 144 Woodfield Road, Washington Township | Bergen | https://www.twpofwashingtonpl.org/ |
| Weehawken Public Library | 49 Hauxhurst Avenue, Weehawken | Hudson | http://www.weehawken-nj.us/library.html |
| West Caldwell Public Library | 30 Clinton Road, West Caldwell | Essex | https://wcplnj.org/ |
| West Orange Public Library | 46 Mt. Pleasant Avenue, West Orange | Essex | https://www.wopl.org/ |
| Westwood Public Library | 49 Park Avenue, Westwood | Bergen | https://www.westwoodpubliclibrary.org/ |
| Wood-Ridge Memorial Library | 231 Hackensack Street, Wood-Ridge | Bergen | https://woodridgememoriallibrary.org/ |
| Wyckoff Public Library | 200 Woodland Avenue, Wyckoff | Bergen | https://wyckofflibrary.org/ |

== See also ==
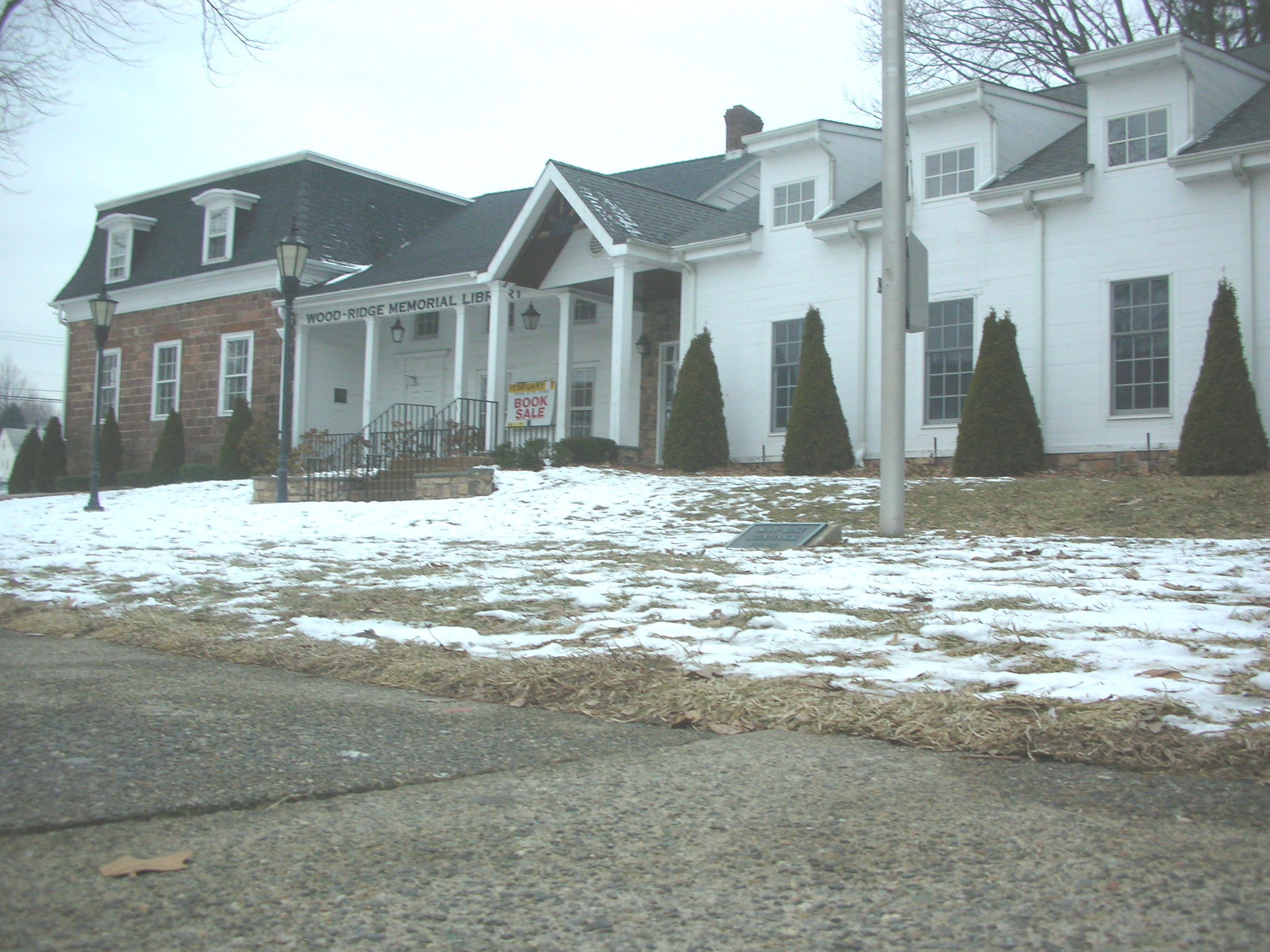
Wood-Ridge Memorial Library, as seen in 2009

- Burlington County Library
- Camden County Library
- Monmouth County Library System
- Ocean County Library
