= Monmouth County Library =

Library in Monmouth, New Jersey, the United States

Coordinates: 40.294044°N 74.304421°W

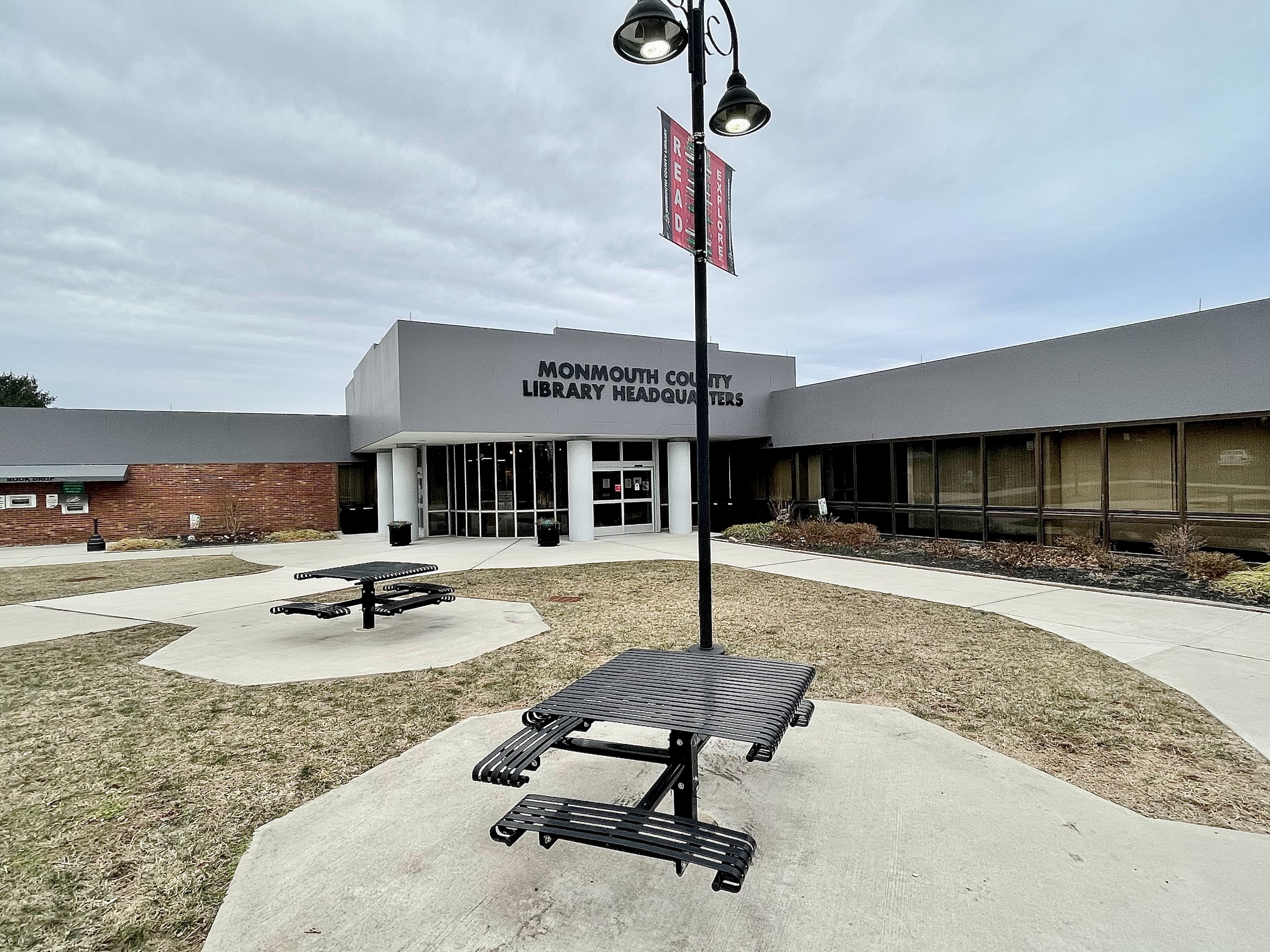
Headquarters in Manalapan

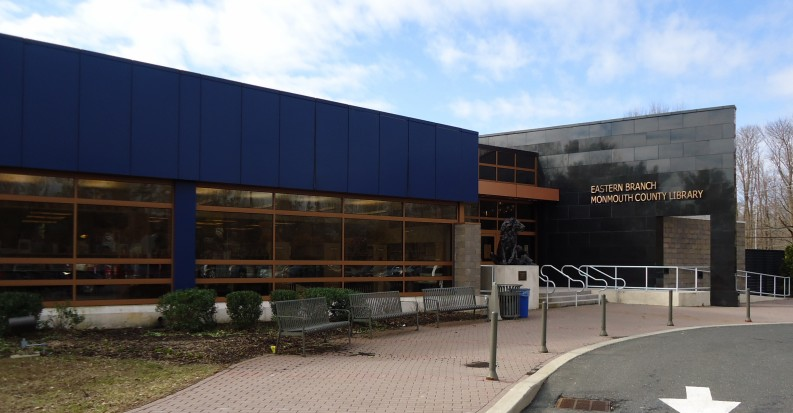
Eastern Branch in Shrewsbury

The Monmouth County Library is the county library system for Monmouth County, New Jersey. It is headquartered in Manalapan, New Jersey. The system was created in 1922.

The two largest locations are Headquarters (Manalapan) and Eastern Branch (Shrewsbury). There are additionally eleven full branch locations, in the municipalities of Allentown, Colts Neck, Hazlet, Holmdel, Howell, Marlboro, Ocean Township, Oceanport, and Wall Township. Residents of these municipalities have the easiest access to branches and their materials.

In addition there are fourteen municipalities that have their own libraries but are members of the Monmouth County Library System, meaning their libraries can borrow materials from the county system but not vice versa.

Additionally there are another fourteen municipalities that have no libraries of their own but are members of the county system. Thus the county system comprises in some way 41 of the 53 municipalities in Monmouth County. A majority of Monmouth County towns pay county library taxes and their residents are entitled to free library cards in the county library system.

The remaining twelve municipalities have their own libraries that are not part of the county system. Instances of such libraries include the Freehold Public Library and the Belmar Public Library. Residents of nonmember towns can purchase library cards in the Monmouth County Library system.

== See also ==
- Bridging Communities, Connecting Library Services
- Burlington County Library
- Camden County Library
- Ocean County Library
