= Free Public Library, Upper Montclair Branch =

- Montclair Public Library - Bellevue Avenue Branch
- U.S. National Register of Historic Places
- New Jersey Register of Historic Places
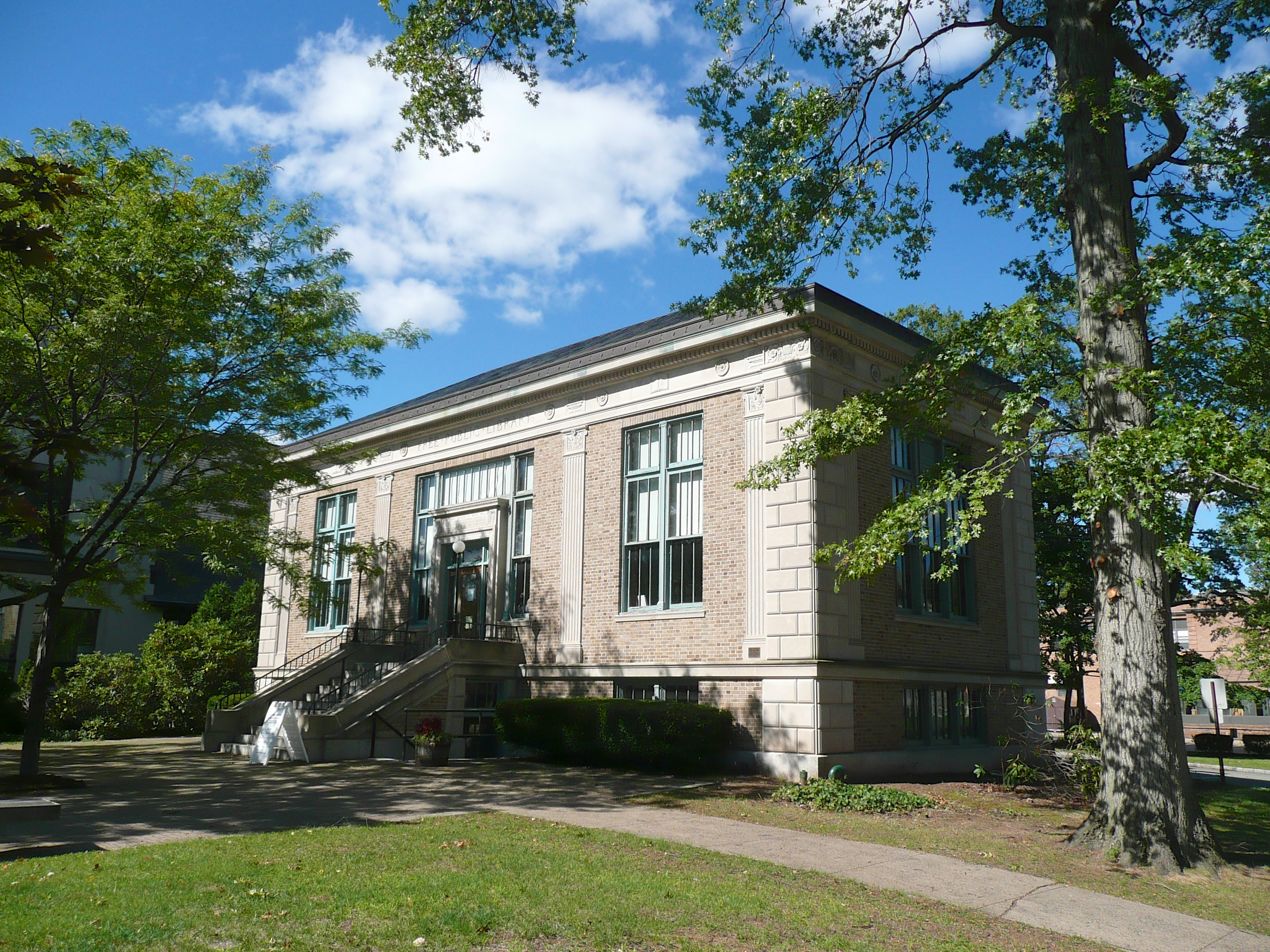

- Location within Essex County, New Jersey Location within New Jersey Location within the United States
- Location: 185 Bellevue Avenue, Montclair, New Jersey
- Coordinates: 40°50′29″N 74°12′19″W
- Built: 1925
- Architect: Francis A. Nelson
- Architectural style: Classical Revival, Institutional
- MPS: Montclair MRA
- NRHP reference No.: 86003076
- NJRHP No.: 1189

Significant dates
- Added to NRHP: July 1, 1988
- Designated NJRHP: September 29, 1986

The Free Public Library, Upper Montclair Branch is located at 185 Bellevue Avenue in the Upper Montclair section of Montclair in Essex County, United States. The building was built in 1914 and still serves as a Bellevue Branch of the Montclair Public Library. It was added to the National Register of Historic Places on July 1, 1988, for its significance in architecture. It was listed in the Public Buildings section of the Historic Resources of Montclair Multiple Property Submission (MPS).

The brick building was designed by architect Francis A. Nelson and has 20th-century institutional style with Classical Revival features.

== See also ==
- National Register of Historic Places listings in Essex County, New Jersey
- List of Carnegie libraries in New Jersey
- East Orange Public Library
