= Freehold Public Library =

Coordinates: 40.261137°N 74.272449°W

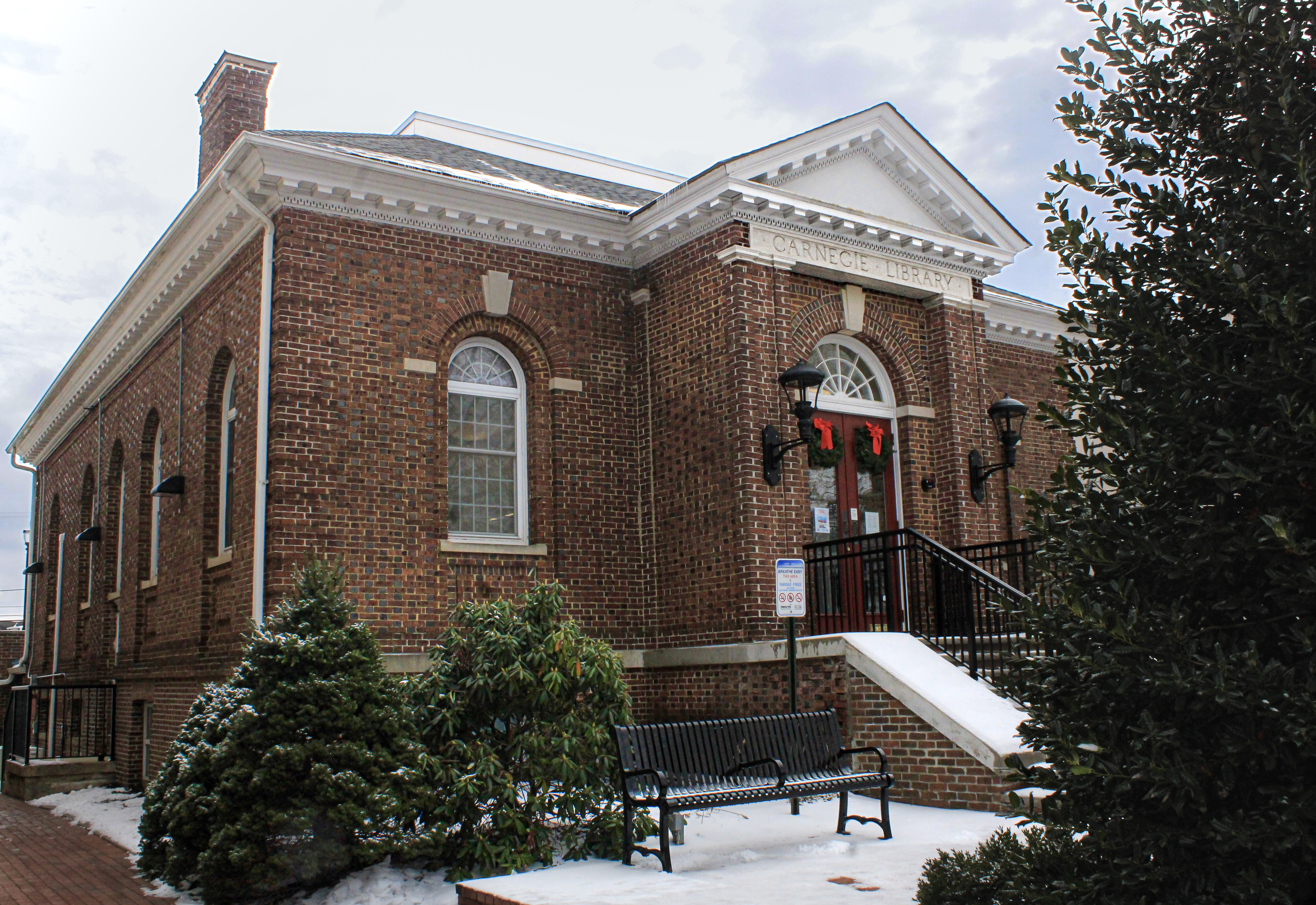
Freehold Public Library

Freehold Public Library is the free public library of Freehold Borough, New Jersey. It is located at 28½ East Main Street.

Serving a population of 11,797 residents and with a collection of approximately 26,000 volumes the library has a yearly circulation of circa 28,000 items. This municipal library is not a member of the Monmouth County Library system. The building is one of the remaining Carnegie-funded libraries in the state and is believed to be the only one with the name Carnegie Library engraved on its facade.

== Founding ==
The King's Daughters, a charitable and social service organization of the Baptist Church, decided at the turn of the 20th century that the county seat of Monmouth County should have a library. It opened on January 6, 1900, in the Lloyd Building at the corner of West Main and Throckmorton Street with a collection of 500 volumes, but was destroyed by fire in December 1901.

== Carnegie library ==
The building is one of New Jersey's 36 Carnegie libraries, constructed with a grant made March 27, 1903 by industrialist Andrew Carnegie and opened in 1904.

Marion Laird, chairwoman of the Library Committee of the King's Daughters, wrote to Carnegie asking for financial support for a new library building. The philanthropist offered $10,000, though records indicated that the donation would eventually be $11,000. Two conditions were stipulated: that the town should provide a suitable site. and that it provide support to the library not less than $1,000 per year.

At the annual election of Freehold Township on March 10, 1903, residents voted to support the levy of a library tax. It was the second town in New Jersey to get a Carnegie grant for a new library, the first being that for the East Orange Public Library in 1900. The borough incorporated 1919 following a referendum to separate from Freehold Township.

The King's Daughters raised $2,000 through donations to buy the lot (known as 29½ East Main Street even then) from the widow Doty. In the summer of 1903 Frederick A. Brower contracted to construct the new library, which cost of $8,874 and opened the following year.

== See also ==
- Belmar Public Library
- List of Carnegie libraries in New Jersey
- National Register of Historic Places listings in Monmouth County, New Jersey
- Monmouth County Courthouse
