= Carnegie Library (Montclair, New Jersey) =

- U.S. National Register of Historic Places
- New Jersey Register of Historic Places
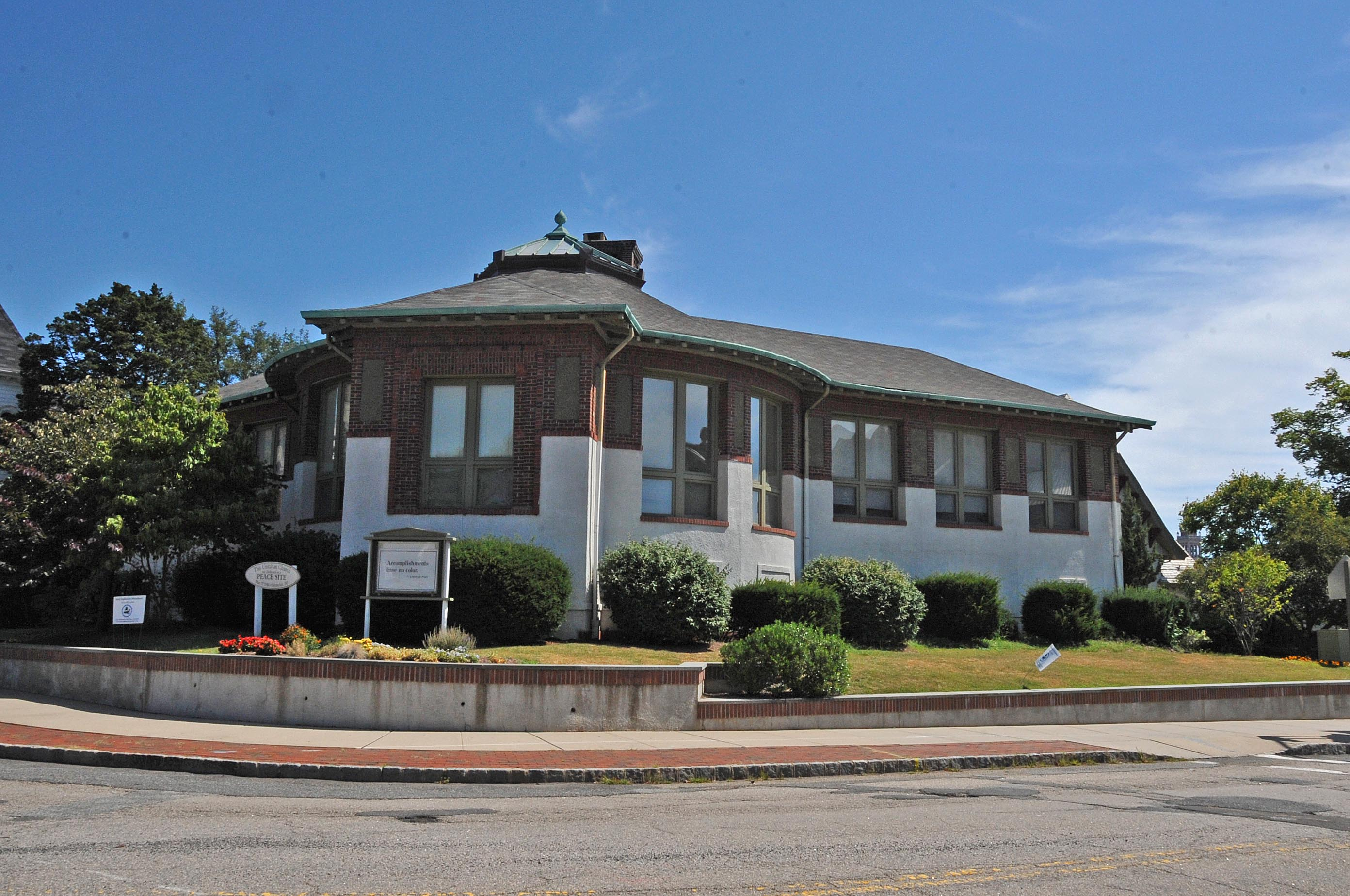

- Location within Essex County, New Jersey Location within New Jersey Location within the United States
- Location: Church Street at Valley Road, Montclair, New Jersey
- Coordinates: 40°48′55″N 74°13′15″W
- Built: 1904
- Architect: John G. Howard
- Architectural style: Prairie School, Eclectic Prairie
- MPS: Montclair MRA
- NRHP reference No.: 86003074
- NJRHP No.: 1106

Significant dates
- Added to NRHP: July 1, 1988
- Designated NJRHP: September 29, 1986

The Carnegie Library is located on Church Street at the corner of Valley Road in the township of Montclair in Essex County, New Jersey, United States. The building was built in 1904 and was added to the National Register of Historic Places on July 1, 1988, for its significance in architecture. It was listed in the Public Buildings section of the Historic Resources of Montclair Multiple Property Submission (MPS).

The library was designed by California architect John G. Howard with an eclectic mix of Bungalow and Prairie School architectural styles. The building is now used by the Unitarian Universalist Congregation at Montclair.

== See also ==
- National Register of Historic Places listings in Essex County, New Jersey
- List of Carnegie libraries in New Jersey
- East Orange Public Library
