= Orange Public Library =

- Orange Free Public Library
- U.S. National Register of Historic Places
- New Jersey Register of Historic Places
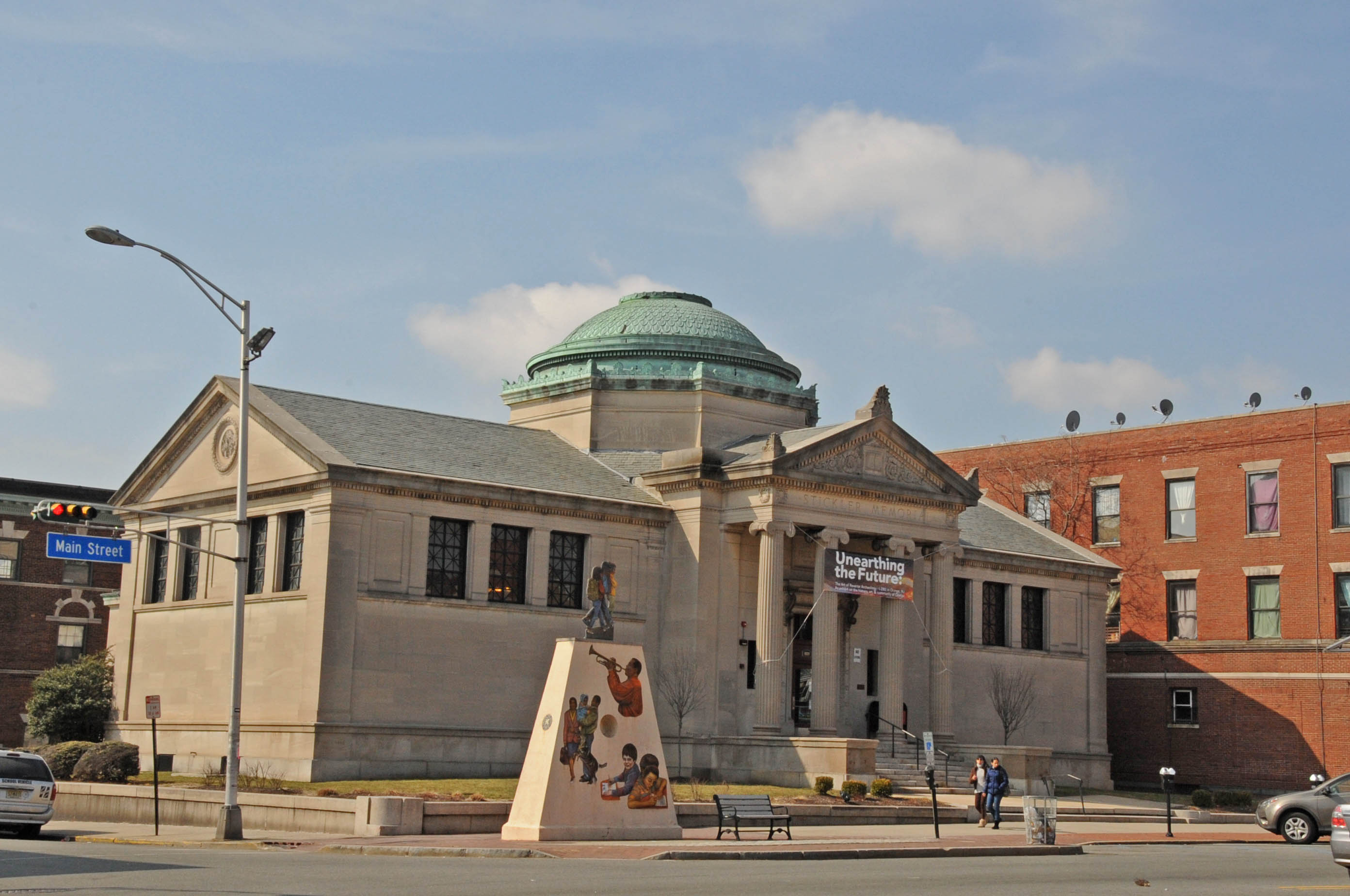

- Location within Essex County, New Jersey
- Location: 348 Main Street; Orange, New Jersey
- Coordinates: 40°46′21″N 74°13′53″W
- Area: less than one acre
- Built: 1901
- Architects: McKim, Mead, and White; Albro & Brower
- Architectural style: Classical Revival
- NRHP reference No.: 81000393
- NJRHP No.: 1354

Significant dates
- Added to NRHP: September 28, 1981
- Designated NJRHP: August 7, 1981

The Orange Public Library is the free public library in Orange, in Essex County, New Jersey, United States. Serving a population of about 33,000, the library collection contains 150,000 volumes and circulates 56,000 annually.

== History ==
The library began in 1883 as association library, supported by dues, endowments and donations and opened its current main building, designed by McKim, Mead, and White, in 1901. Across its facade is engraved Stickler Memorial in honor of the son, who had died suddenly a year earlier, of Mr. and Mrs. Joseph Stickler, who donated the $100,000 cost of its construction. It was built during the "free library movement" at the turn of the 20th century. In a 1945 referendum the citizens approved support for a free public library, and took over the operations of the building as municipally operated facility. It was added to the state and federal registers of historic places in 1981. In 2010 it was estimated that refurbishing the building, in need of repairs, would cost $1.5 million. Dennis Kowal Architects, historic preservation and library design specialists, developed Preservation Plans to restore the building and update the library services resulting in a Historic Trust Grant. In phase one, the rotunda was opened and phase two is under study.

== See also ==
- National Register of Historic Places listings in Essex County, New Jersey
- List of Carnegie libraries in New Jersey
- East Orange Public Library
