= Belleville Public Library and Information Center =

Coordinates: 40.788587°N 74.152533°W

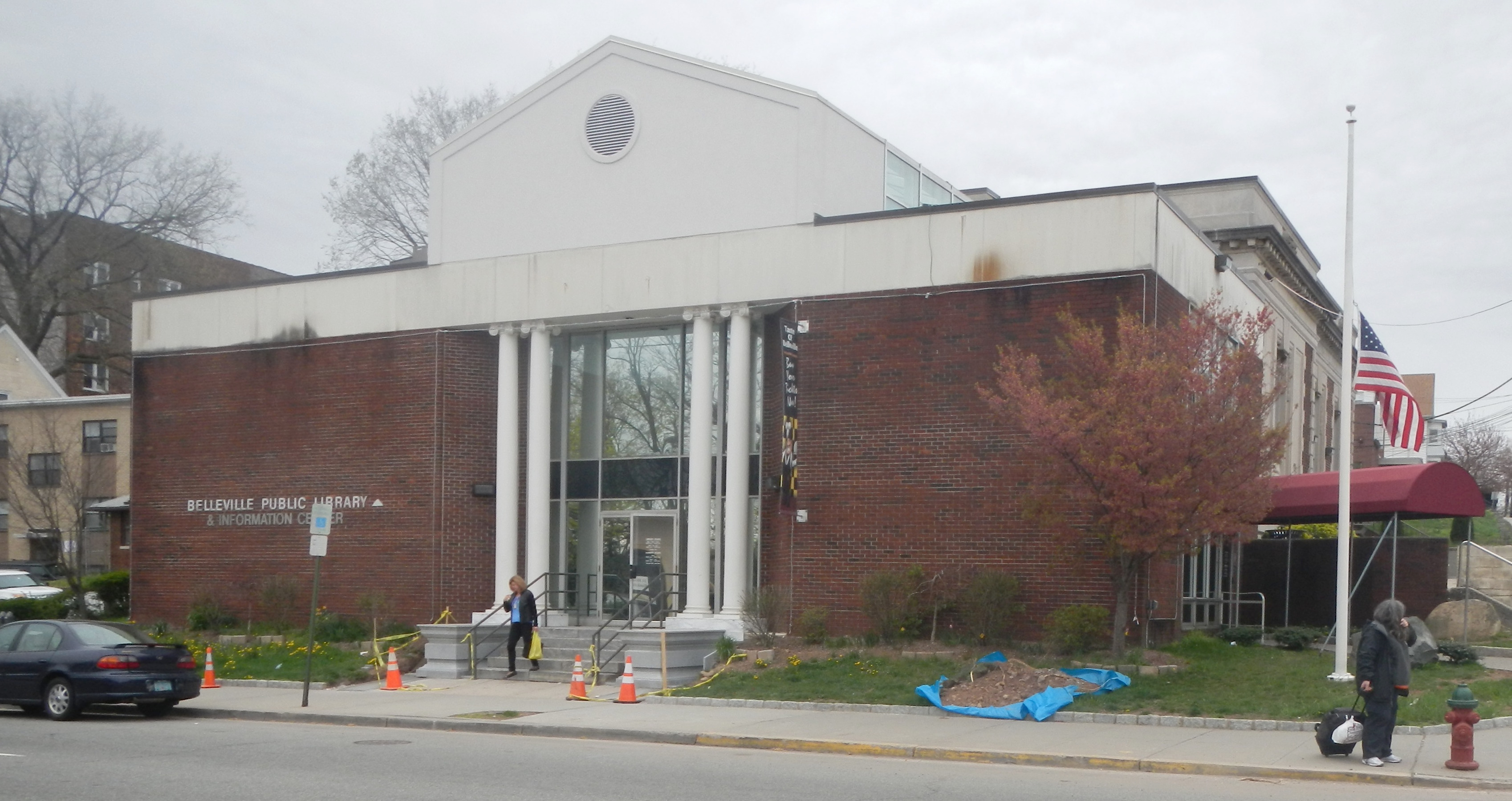
2013

The Belleville Public Library and Information Center is the free public library of Belleville, New Jersey located at 221 Washington Avenue. Serving a population of approximately 36,000, the library in 2011 includes a collection of 105,452 volumes and has a circulation of about 39,000 items per year.

== History and architecture ==
Belleville's library was started in a storefront by a volunteer organization, the Tuesday Afternoon Reading Club. By 1909, a site at Academy and Washington Streets was acquired from the municipality and Charles Granville Jones, a local architect who also designed the town hall, Methodist church, First National Bank, and old high school, was hired. Opened in 1911, with an additional stacks area added in 1929, it is one of New Jersey's original thirty-six Carnegie libraries, constructed with a grant of $20,000 made on April 28, 1909, by the Carnegie Corporation, still in use. In 1981, an addition was attached to the original building thus obscuring the pediment and columns at the library's entrance.

Many of the Carnegie Room's original details were hidden by 1970s modernizations that also concealed severe water damage. In the early 1990s, new systems were installed and the Carnegie Room was redecorated under the guidance of James J. Cozzarelli Jr, a library trustee for whom the Children's Room is named. Taking inspiration from its original architectural details, Cozzarelli choose to apply new surfaces and commissioned a series of paintings for the ceiling that tells the "dramatic tale of a young man's search for wisdom" Evaluated by the New Jersey State Historic Preservation Office in 1976 the building was not listed on the state or the national registers of historic places.

== See also ==
- List of Carnegie libraries in New Jersey
- Reformed Dutch Church of Second River
- National Register of Historic Places listings in Essex County, New Jersey
