= Springfield City Library (Massachusetts) =

Public library system in Springfield, Massachusetts

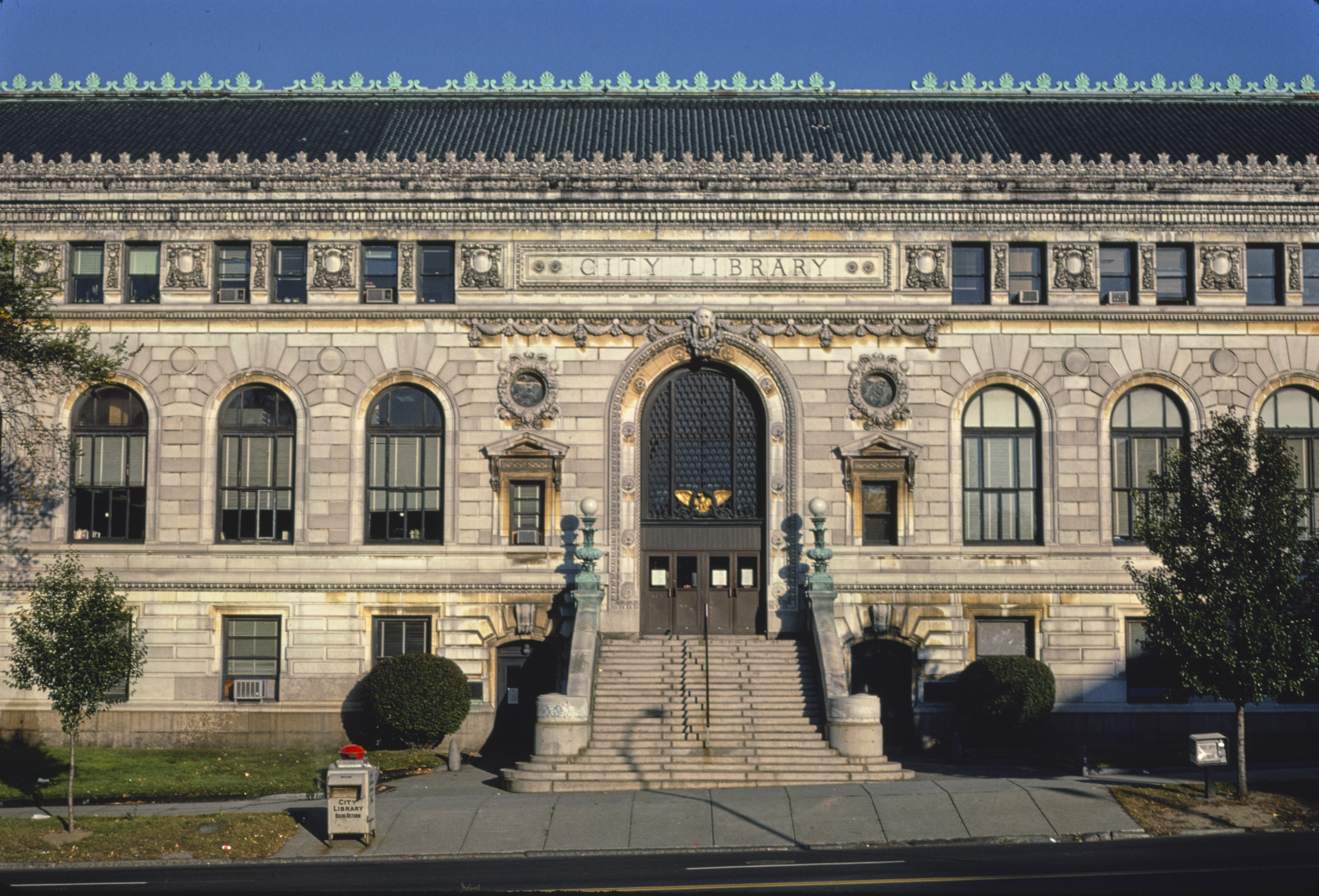
- Location: Springfield, Massachusetts, United States
- Type: Public
- Established: 1885
- Architect: Edward Lippincott Tilton
- Branches: 10

Access and use
- Circulation: 390,965
- Population served: 154,789

Other information
- Budget: $6,381,951
- Director: Molly Fogarty
- Employees: 168
- Public transit access: Pioneer Valley Transit Authority: G3, B7
- Website: www.springfieldlibrary.org/library/

The Springfield City Library is a public library system in Springfield, Massachusetts. The system includes ten branches across the city, with the Central branch located at 220 State Street, next to Merrick Park.

== History ==
In 1857, the City Library Association was formed in Springfield in response to the 1851 Massachusetts Public Library Law, which authorized cities and towns to establish and maintain public libraries, as well as an 1855 petition by residents requesting funding for a library. Prior to this, the Springfield Library Company ran a private library, which had been founded as early as 1796 and contained over 300 volumes. The City Library Association provided a room in City Hall to be used as a library, although it was still privately funded until 1885, when a city appropriation removed all fees. Private donations and gifts totaling $100,000 allowed for the creation of a Gothic-style building, located on the corner of State Street and Chestnut Street. The land was donated by George Bliss, the former Speaker of the Massachusetts House of Representatives and President of the Massachusetts Senate. The Rev. Dr.William Rice served as President and Director of the Springfield City Library Association from 1861 to his death in 1897. Rice is described as the "master hand" behind all facets of the development of the library during this time.

By 1892, the Library had outgrown the building, and plans began to construct a new library building. In order to provide continuous library service to Springfield residents during the construction, Charles R. Trask was hired to move the original building 200 feet to make space for the new building. This task was completed over three weeks, using twelve steel rollers and a team of twelve men, moving the building an average of ten feet per day. The city allocated $18,498 for the construction of the new building, and in 1905, Andrew Carnegie donated $260,000 to the City Library Association to assist with the Central Library construction, as well as three additional branches. These included the Springfield Indian Orchard Branch, designed by John Donahue in a Georgian Revival style and opened in 1909, as well as the Forest Park Library, frequently visited by Theodor S. Geisel as child, and the Springfield Memorial Square branch, now used as a Greek cultural center. With an additional $155,000 contributed by Springfield residents, construction on the Central Library began in April 1910 for a Renaissance Revival style building designed by Edward Lippincott Tilton. A trestle designed by city librarian Hiller C. Wellman was used to transport books from the old building to the new one, and the branch officially opened on January 10, 1912. The library claims to be one of the first to feature open shelving, and to circulate phonograph records.

In 1974, the Central Library was put on the National Register of Historic Places. The Indian Orchard Branch was added to the Register in 1999. Major renovations at the Central Library were completed in 2019 to improve accessibility, replace the gutter system, and install an outdoor plaza.

In 2005, the Springfield Library Foundation was formed and incorporated as a 501(c)3 not-for-profit corporation, helping to support the purchase of books and materials, facility improvements, and staff development initiatives.

City library employees, who are unionized, picketed the Central Library in July, 2023 to protest inaction in construction of a crosswalk on State Street, where the Central branch is located. The pickets were a response to the death of librarian Gayle Ball, who was struck and killed by a driver while crossing the street to the employee parking lot.
