= Elizabeth Public Library =

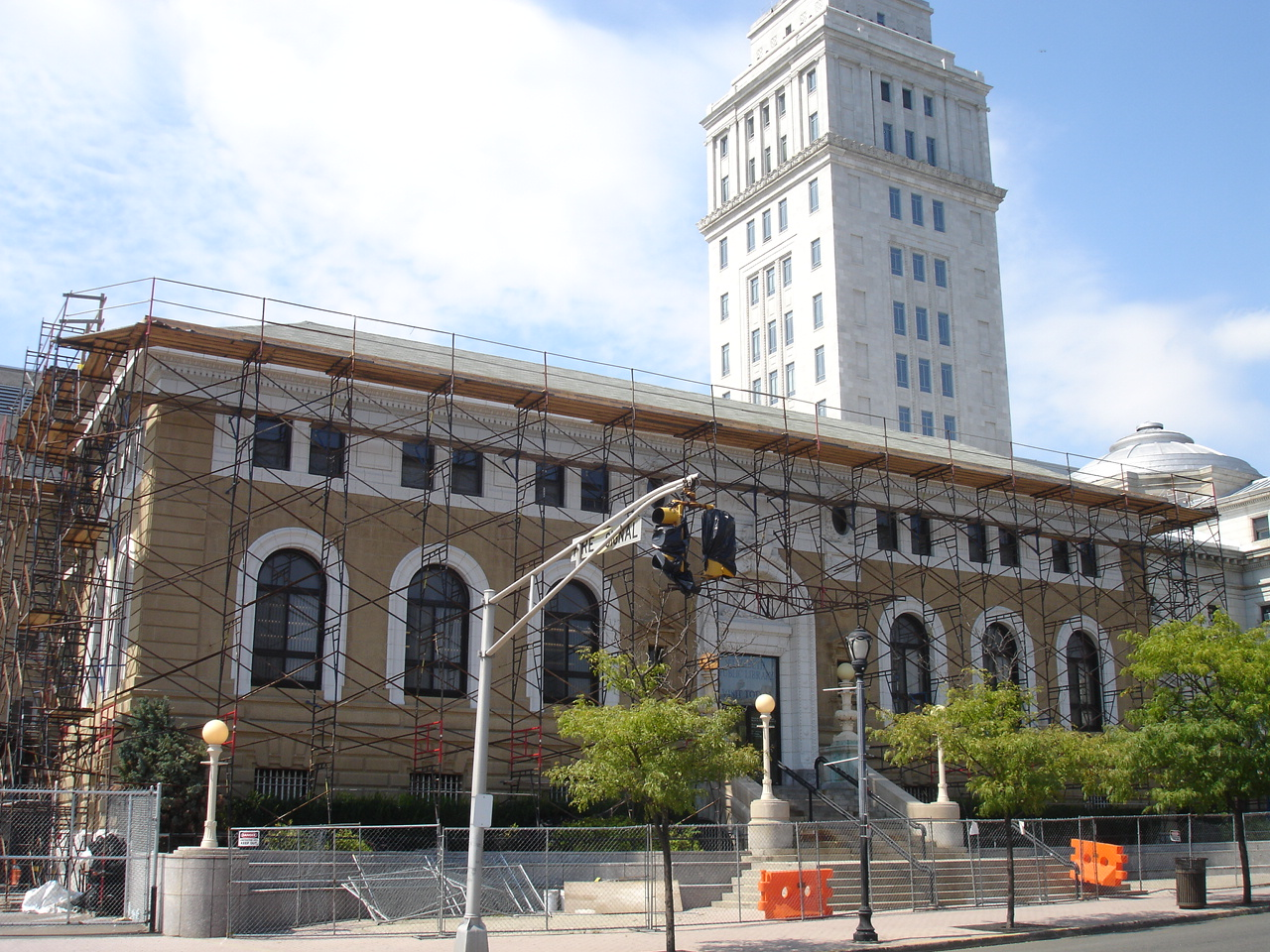
The Main Library undergoing renovations in Fall 2011

The Elizabeth Public Library is the free public library of Elizabeth, New Jersey. Serving a population of approximately 127,558, its collection contains 342,305 volumes, circulating 190,581 items annually from its four locations.

== Locations ==
- Main Library - 11 South Broad Street
- LaCorte Branch Library - 408 Palmer Street
- Elmora Branch Library - 730 W. Grand Street
- Elizabethport Branch Library - 102-110 Third Street

== Carnegie library building ==
- Mid-Town Historic District
- U.S. National Register of Historic Places
- U.S. Historic district – Contributing property
- New Jersey Register of Historic Places
- Location within Union County, New Jersey Location within New Jersey Location within the United States
- Coordinates: 40.661539°N 74.215199°W
- NRHP reference No.: 95001143
- NJRHP No.: 2665

Significant dates
- Added to NRHP: October 5, 1995
- Designated NJRHP: September 29, 1994

Elizabeth's Main Library was built during the "free library movement" at the turn of the 20th century in part with the impetus of Charles N. Fowler, US Congressman from Union County. It is one of New Jersey's original thirty-six Carnegie libraries, which by the 1940s had become one of the busiest libraries of its size in the USA. Records show that millionaire Andrew Carnegie granted $130,810 made February 3, 1910, for the main and no longer existing Liberty Plaza branch libraries. Opened in 1912, the building, reminiscent of an Italian palazzo and the Boston Public Library was designed by Edward Lippincott Tilton, who had designed many other Carnegie libraries as well as the immigration station at Ellis Island. It is a contributing property to the Midtown Historic District, a state and federal historic district established in 1994–1995. The Main Library is the Federal Depository Library for Union County.

== Branch libraries ==
The Elizabeth Public Library consists of its main library along with 3 other branch libraries, which includes the Elmora, LaCorte, and Elizabethport branches.

=== Elmora ===
Located in Elmora, a neighborhood in Elizabeth containing a modern orthodox populace. Behind the library’s parking lot contains Groundwork Elizabeth's Microfarm, 3/4 acre microfarm accessible to the public.

=== LaCorte ===
The Nicholas S. LaCorte Branch is located in Peterstown, a neighborhood in Elizabeth marked by Italian roots and history. The library is in the Peterstown Community Center, which also houses the Public Health Nursing Clinic and the City of Elizabeth Office on Aging Senior Center.

=== Elizabethport ===
Also known as the E-Port branch, it is the newest branch of the libraries. Located in the downtown / port area of Elizabeth, the oldest area in the city.

== Services ==
The Elizabeth Public Library has programs and services for people of all ages. The library's website has information about its free monthly events, adult classes, databases, and exhibitions. Its reoccurring adult classes include computer classes, often taught in both English and Spanish, ESL, English conversation, and GED / HSE classes.

== See also ==
- List of Carnegie libraries in New Jersey
- National Register of Historic Places listings in Union County, New Jersey
