= List of Carnegie libraries in New Jersey =

The following list of Carnegie libraries in New Jersey provides information on United States Carnegie libraries in New Jersey, where 36 libraries were built from grants totaling $1,066,553 awarded by the Carnegie Corporation of New York from 1900 to 1917. There are 17 municipal libraries with Carnegie buildings still in operation as public libraries (*). Two have become academic libraries.

== Key ==
Building still operating as a library
Building standing, but now serving another purpose
Building no longer standing
Building listed on the National Register of Historic Places
Building contributes to a historic district on the National Register of Historic Places

== Carnegie libraries ==
	Library	Municipality	Image	Date granted	Grant amount	Location	Status
1	Atlantic City	Atlantic City		Jan 22, 1903	$71,075	35 S. Dr. Martin Luther King Blvd.	Formerly part of Stockton University, now owned by Atlantic City
2	Avon	Avon-by-the-Sea		May 15, 1916	$5,000		*Avon Public Library
3	Bayonne	Bayonne		Apr 13, 1903	$83,000	697 Avenue C	Bayonne Public Library
4	Belleville	Belleville		Apr 28, 1909	$20,000		
5	Belmar	Belmar		Jan 14, 1914	$13,000		
6	Caldwell	Caldwell		Jan 8, 1908	$10,000		*Caldwell Public Library
7	Camden Main	Camden		Jan 2, 1903	$120,000	616 Broadway	Closed in 1986
8	Camden Cooper	Camden		Jan 2, 1903	—		Now part of Rutgers–Camden
9	Camden East Camden	Camden		Jan 2, 1903	—		Razed
10	Collingswood	Collingswood		Jan 5, 1916	$15,000		Razed
11	Cranford	Cranford		Jan 20, 1908	$10,000		Razed 1962
12	East Orange Main	East Orange		Jan 18, 1900	$116,000	291 Main Street	Now East Orange Municipal Court
13	East Orange Elmwood	East Orange		Jan 18, 1900	—		
14	East Orange Franklin	East Orange		Jan 18, 1900	—		
15	Edgewater	Edgewater		Mar 16, 1915	$15,000	49 Hudson Ave.	Listed on the New Jersey Register of Historic Places and National Register of Historic Places in 2009
16	Elizabeth Main	Elizabeth		Feb 3, 1910	$130,810		
17	Elizabeth Liberty Square	Elizabeth		Feb 3, 1910	—	240 Elizabeth Ave.	Now a senior citizen center
18	Englewood	Englewood		Jul 9, 1913	$25,000		Office building
19	Freehold	Freehold		Mar 27, 1903	$11,000	28 1/2 East Main Street	Independent municipal library. Undergoing renovation (ADA improvements, new interior spaces, mechanicals, roof, etc.) in 2023.
20	Kearny	Kearny		Jan 16, 1906	$27,600	318 Kearny Ave.	
21	Lakewood	Lakewood		Feb 3, 1917	$12,500		
22	Little Falls	Little Falls		Apr 3, 1917	$10,000		Razed
23	Long Branch	Long Branch		Feb 3, 1917	$30,000		*Long Branch Free Public Library
24	Montclair Bellevue	Montclair		Mar 8, 1901	$60,000	185 Bellevue Ave.	Opened December 26, 1914 Francis Augustus Nelson, Architect
25	Montclair Montclair	Montclair		Mar 8, 1901	—	73 Church St.	Building used as Unitarian Church
26	New Brunswick	New Brunswick		Mar 14, 1902	$52,500		*New Brunswick Free Public Library
27	Nutley	Nutley		Feb 13, 1913	$20,000		*Nutley Public Library
28	Orange	Orange		Apr 19, 1915	$1,500	348 Main St.	The grant was for the purchase of a new library branch.
29	Perth Amboy	Perth Amboy		Mar 8, 1901	$50,450	196 Jefferson Street	Listed on the National Register of Historic Places in 2025.
30	Plainfield	Plainfield		Feb 7, 1911	$50,000		Razed
31	Summit	Summit		Feb 1, 1909	$21,000		Razed Replaced by newer Summit Public Library in 1964
32	Union	Union Hill		Feb 5, 1904	$25,000		*Union City Public Library; Union City
33	Verona	Verona		Mar 31, 1916	$11,000		*Verona Public Library
34	Vineland	Vineland		Feb 2, 1903	$12,000		Senior center
35	West Hoboken	West Hoboken		Feb 4, 1902	$25,000	420 15th St.	William Musto Cultural Center; Union City
36	Westfield	Westfield		Dec 30, 1904	$15,000	266 E. Broad St.	Library relocated 1954, now a business complex

== History ==
A few of the first public libraries created in New Jersey date back to the mid-eighteenth century, more than twenty of which were established and operational by 1800. When the New Jersey Library Association (NJLA) was founded in 1890, upwards of fifty-seven public libraries were established and operating statewide. In 1900, New Jersey state legislature created the Public Library Commission (PLC) as a method to provide support for public libraries. Around this same time, Andrew Carnegie was in the process of assisting communities all across the United States in building, staffing, and providing support for public libraries. During his mission, Andrew Carnegie donated millions of dollars to the construction and operation of thousands of libraries for "the improvement of mankind."

Due in part to his contributions, New Jersey acquired two hundred and three new libraries in those twenty years, bringing the total number of operational public libraries in New Jersey from one hundred and two in 1901 to three hundred and twenty-five in 1920. The state of New Jersey was allocated $1,066,935 across twenty nine communities, which ranked New Jersey as the number eleven state in terms of the number of communities assisted by Andrew Carnegie's donations. The communities that were assisted ranged from large cities to small towns and contained a diverse selection on economic backgrounds. In these twenty-nine communities, there were twenty-nine main libraries built as well as an additional six branch libraries. At this time, New Jersey as was the sixteenth most populated state and only received fourteen percent of the total granted donated by Andrew Carnegie.

== See also ==
- List of libraries in the United States
