= Hoboken Public Library =

Public library of Hoboken, New Jersey, United States

- Hoboken Free Public Library and Manual Training School
- U.S. National Register of Historic Places
- New Jersey Register of Historic Places
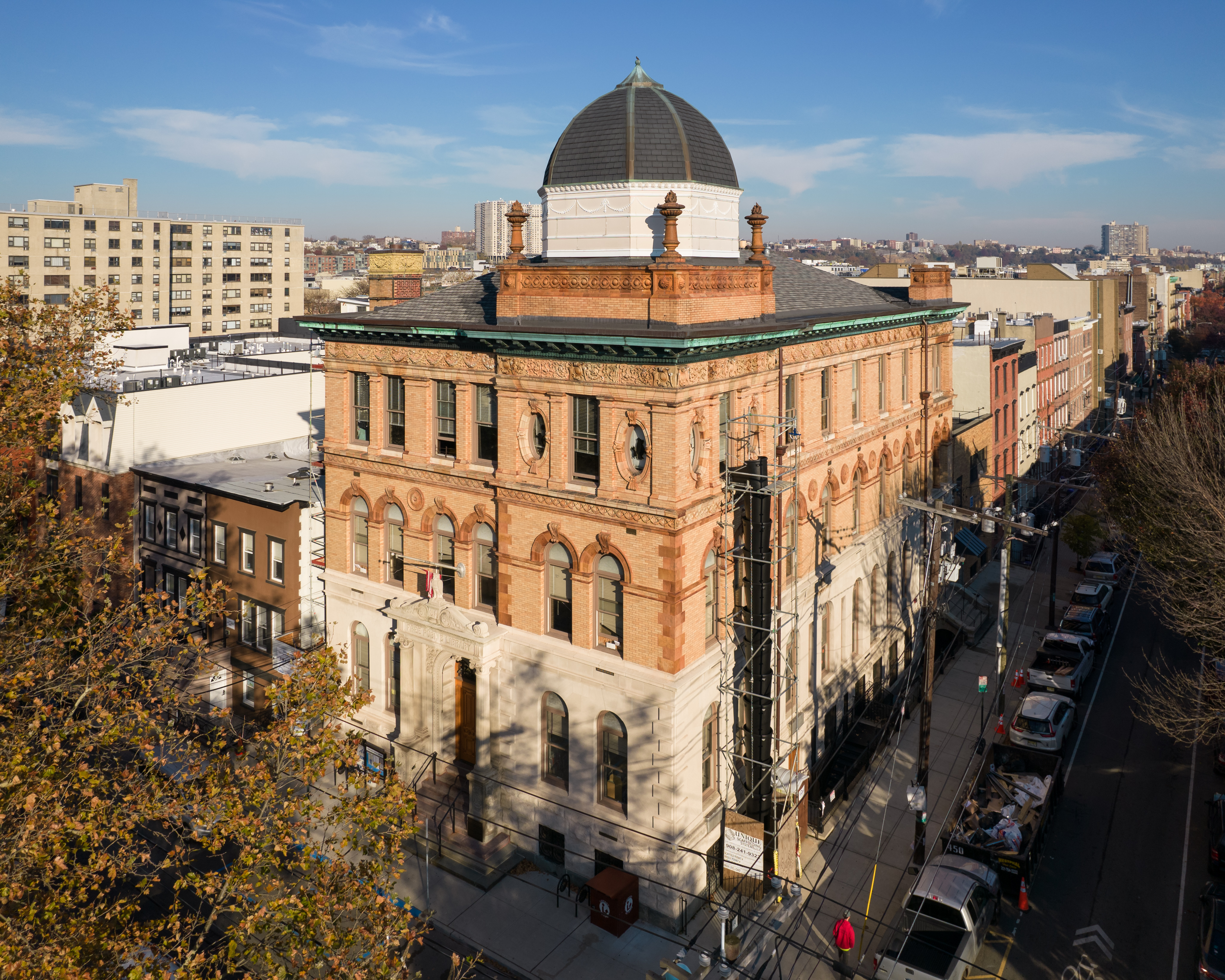

- Location within Hudson County, New Jersey Location within New Jersey Location within the United States
- Location: 500 Park Avenue; Church Square Park, Hoboken, New Jersey
- Coordinates: 40.7429°N 74.0323°W
- Built: 1897
- Architect: Albert Beyer
- Architectural style: Italian Renaissance Revival
- NRHP reference No.: 14000535
- NJRHP No.: 4985

Significant dates
- Added to NRHP: August 4, 2015
- Designated NJRHP: April 14, 2014

The Hoboken Public Library is the free public library of Hoboken, New Jersey. It is a member of Bridging Communities, Connecting Library Services, a consortium of municipal libraries in the northeastern New Jersey counties of Bergen, Hudson, Passaic, and Essex. The library was established in 1889 and expanded through the philanthropy of Martha Bayard Stevens. The library building, located at 500 Park Avenue, was built from 1895 to 1897, and was designed by architect Albert Beyer with Italian Renaissance Revival style. It was added to the National Register of Historic Places on August 4, 2015, for its significance in architecture, education and social history.

The library also operates a small branch at 124 Grand St., in the Multi-Service Community Center building housing various other municipal services.

== See also ==
- National Register of Historic Places listings in Hudson County, New Jersey
- Landmarks of Hoboken, New Jersey
