= Edgewater Public Library =

- U.S. National Register of Historic Places
- New Jersey Register of Historic Places
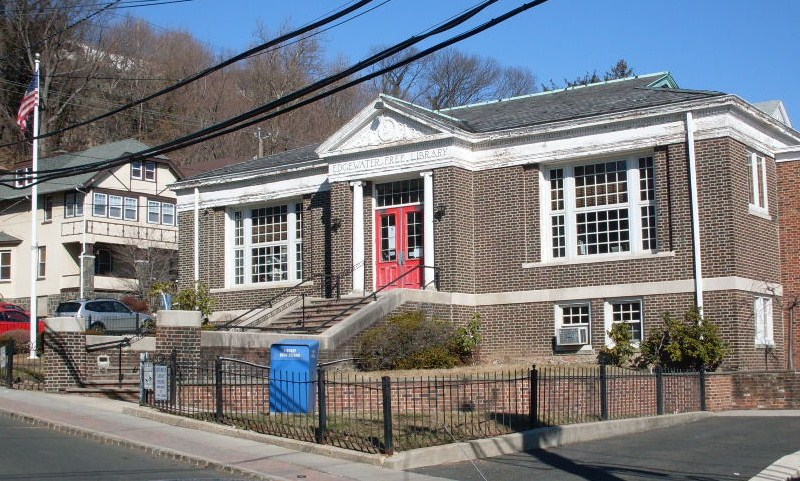

- Location within Bergen County, New Jersey
- Location: 49 Hudson Avenue Edgewater, New Jersey
- Coordinates: 40°49′47″N 73°58′27″W
- Built: 1915
- Architectural style: Colonial Revival
- NRHP reference No.: 09001154
- NJRHP No.: 4738

Significant dates
- Added to NRHP: December 23, 2009
- Designated NJRHP: January 5, 2009

The Edgewater Public Library is located at 48 Hudson Avenue in Edgewater, in Bergen County, in the U.S. state of New Jersey.

Serving a population of 7,677, the library in 2011 included a collection of 20,402 volumes. As a member of Bridging Communities, Connecting Library Services, a consortium of municipal libraries in the northeastern New Jersey counties of Bergen, Hudson, Passaic, and Essex, it has a circulation of 52,627 items per year.

The building is one of New Jersey's 36 Carnegie libraries, constructed with a grant of $15,000 made March 16, 1915 by the Carnegie Corporation and opened in 1916. Engraved about its entrance is Edgewater Free Library. In 2009, the library was listed on the state and national registers of historic places.

== See also ==
- List of Carnegie libraries in New Jersey
- Edgewater Borough Hall
- National Register of Historic Places listings in Bergen County, New Jersey
