= Ocean County Library =

Public library system in New Jersey, US

Coordinates: 39°57′8.56″N 74°11′44.83″W

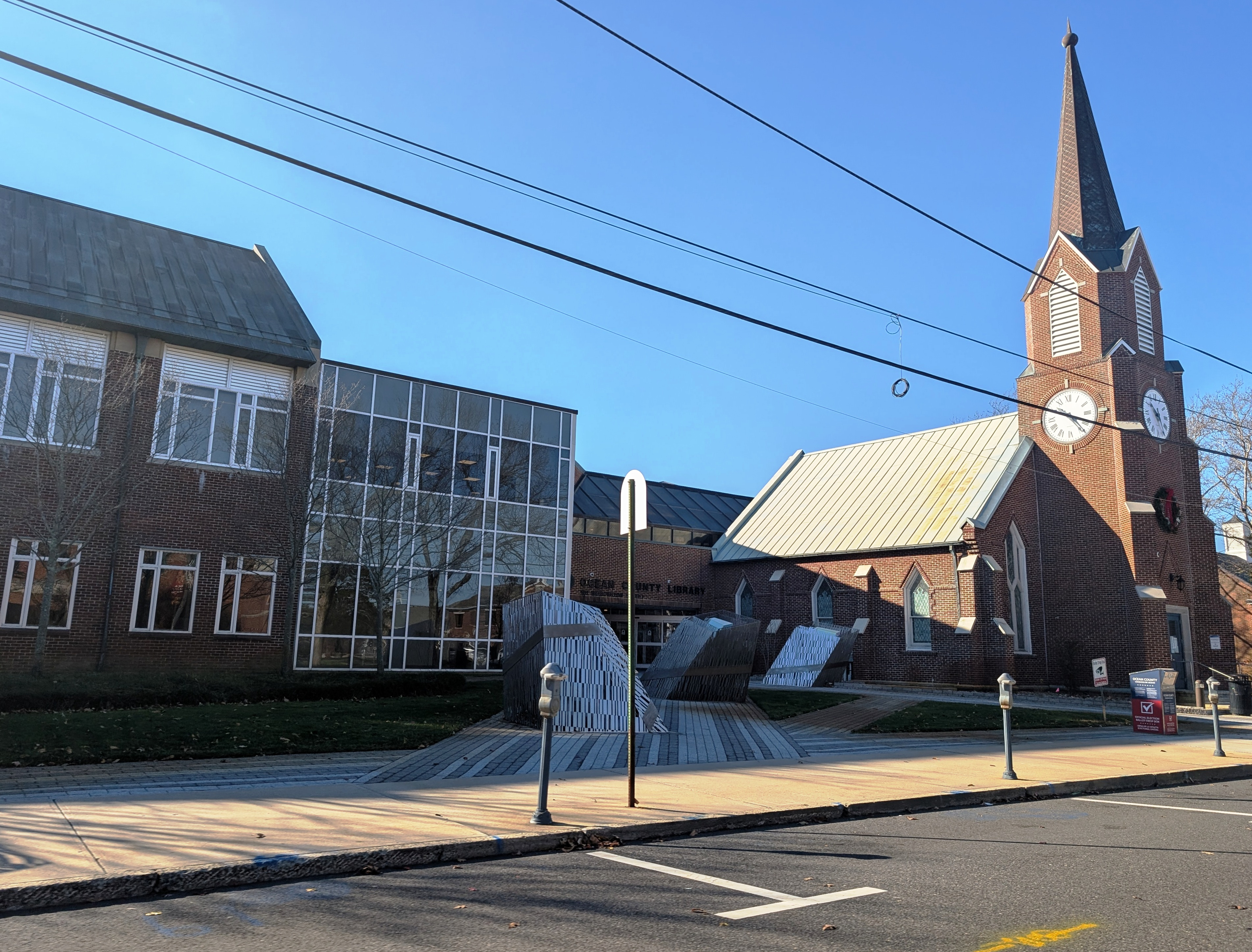
- Headquarters building in Toms River
- Location: Headquarters: Toms River, New Jersey
- Established: 1925
- Branches: 19 branches, 2 reading centers

Access and use
- Circulation: 4,302,781 in 2014
- Population served: 575,395 (US Census 2010 population for Ocean County minus Beach Haven)

Other information
- Budget: $36,987,888.00 in 2014
- Director: Susan Quinn
- Employees: 600+
- Website: www.theoceancountylibrary.org

Ocean County Library is a public library system that serves 32 municipalities out of the 33 municipalities of Ocean County, New Jersey. Beach Haven on Long Beach Island is not a member municipality. The Headquarters branch is in Toms River. It also offers Outreach services to life care centers, Books by Mail and Home Borrowers services for the homebound, and a volunteer program. There are active Friends of the Library groups associated with individual branches. There are approximately 380,000 registered borrowers, and 290,000 bibliographic records in the catalog. Annual circulation was near 4.4 million in 2014. All library locations have free wireless access to the Internet and internet terminals for public use.

== History ==
The Ocean County Library opened its doors to the public on September 19, 1925. Its location was a small cottage, known as the Lonan Building, on the grounds of the County Courthouse. The service area encompassed 30 of the 33 county municipalities. Dover and Lakewood Townships, and Beach Haven Borough, having municipal libraries, were excluded.

The cottage was open to the public one day a week, while a Model T panelled truck took library service to the rural portion of the 28,000 population by stopping at schools and “stations” which were located in post offices, stores and enclosed porches of private homes. During World War II, there was even a station at a Coast Guard Station.

A Dover Township referendum vote in 1976 increased the Library's geographical service area to 31 municipalities. Bishop Memorial Library on Washington Street in Toms River became part of the Ocean County Library, but continued to serve Dover residents until both floors were converted to use by the Children's Services Department in 1978.

Needing more space, the library was moved to temporary quarters in the Robbins Street Firehouse before moving to the East Wing of the Ocean County Courthouse in 1950. In 1962, the Library moved to 15 Hooper Avenue, a 7,400-square-foot (690 m^{2}) building that had been a gymnasium for St. Joseph's School, and is now the Ocean County Probation Office. From this location, the Library expanded into the "White House" on the corner of Hooper Avenue and Water Street and, in 1978, into the Bishop Building.

On October 13, 1981, the Ocean County Library opened the doors of a 50,000-square-foot (4,600 m^{2}) building at 101 Washington Street, facing the County Courthouse. This building surrounded and included the former Presbyterian Church of Toms River as a meeting room. The church cornerstone was laid in 1853. The church moved to a new location in 1970 leaving the building empty. The building was purchased by Dover Township and was incorporated into the library in 1981. The church steeple was badly damaged over the years and was removed as part of the expansion of the Toms River Branch in 2005. The former church with a newly constructed steeple is now a coffee shop open during most library hours.

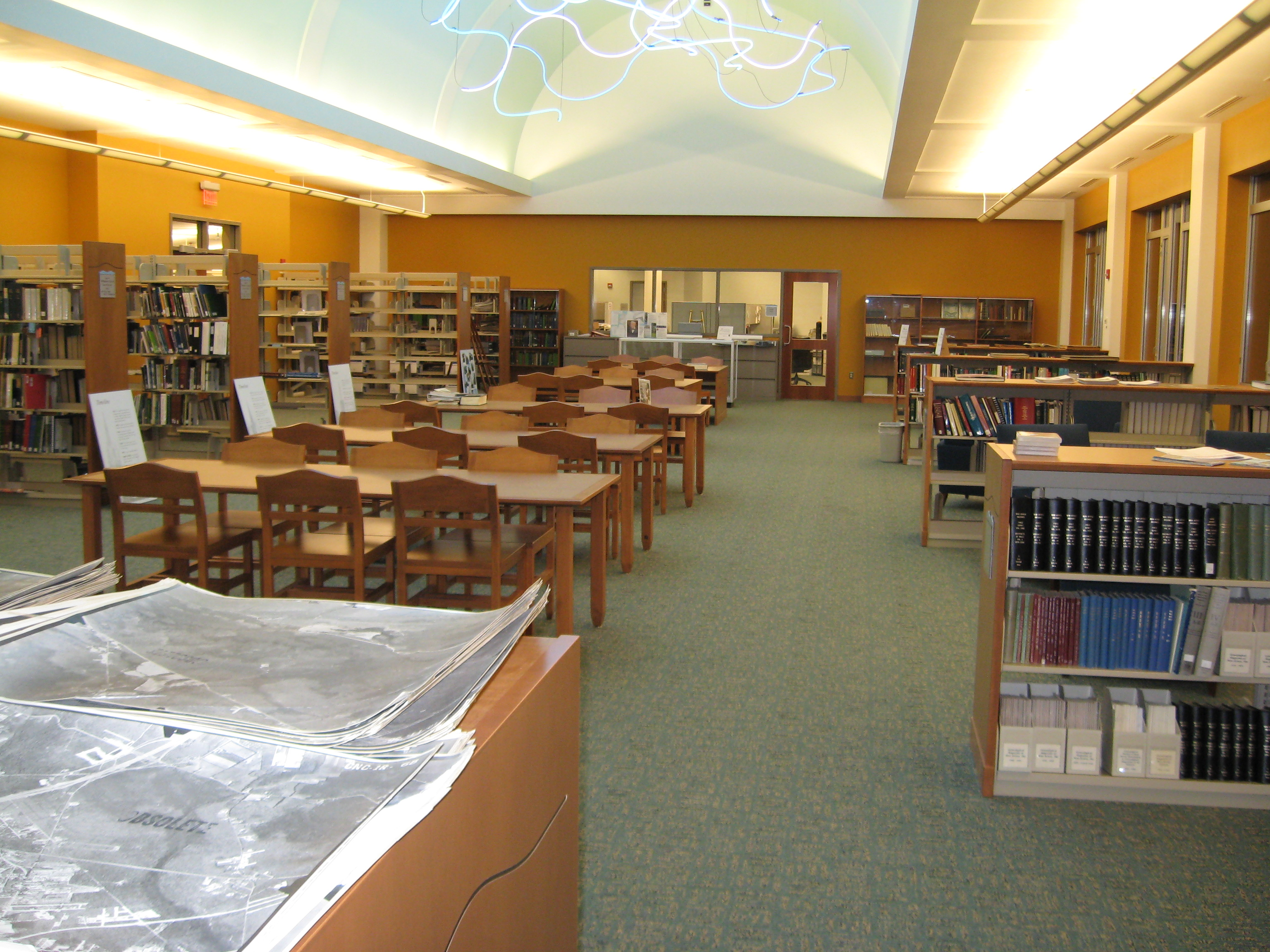
The new Hugh B. Wheeler reading room contains an extensive genealogy collection, along with other materials and a reading area.

The Bishop Building, named after the writer and adventurer Nathaniel Holmes Bishop, was re-dedicated in October, 1984 to house a non-circulating local history and research collection. On September 18, 1997, a new computer training lab was dedicated in the Bishop Building. In 2006, all services formerly available in the Bishop Building were moved to the main building. The genealogical and historical research collection was moved to the Wheeler Room and the computer training lab was expanded and re-established as the Technology Lab with all new equipment. The future use of the Bishop Building includes plans as a venue for community events and training center for the library staff.

On January 28, 2006, a major renovation and extension of the Toms River Branch opened. The building is now doubled in size. The $12.9 million construction project began in October 2002, when ground was broken on a 52,000-square-foot (4,800 m^{2}) expansion of the original library building.

Over $600,000 was devoted to original art installation in the new building. The art includes "Buzzy" and "O" steel sculptures by Michael Allen Malpass of Brick, New Jersey, "Sandbar # 1" and "Sandbar # 2" suspended textile atrium sculpture by Joanie San Chirico of Toms River, "Reflections of the Ocean County Library," an 8-foot (2.4 m) bas relief sculpture in bonded bronze created by Toms River sculptor Brian Hanlon, a terrazzo floor in the atrium by Michele Oka Doner of New York, "Acqua Viva," "Drifting," "Sunyata" and "Embryo," four oil paintings of jellyfish by Helaine Rainier of Toms River, New Jersey, and a large mostly argon light sculpture called "Woven Light" by Chris Freeman in the Hugh B. Wheeler Room.

Ocean County Library was significantly impacted by Hurricane Sandy in October 2012. The Bay Head Reading Center was closed until June 2013 for repairs. The Upper Shores Branch in Lavallette reopened in early September 2013. The library hosted many events to help Ocean County residents impacted by the storm including hosting resources expos where governmental and nonprofit groups could meet and assist storm survivors.

Elaine McConnell retired after 25 years as library director at the end of August 2009. Susan Quinn was appointed Library Director August 17, 2009.

== Branches and Reading Centers ==
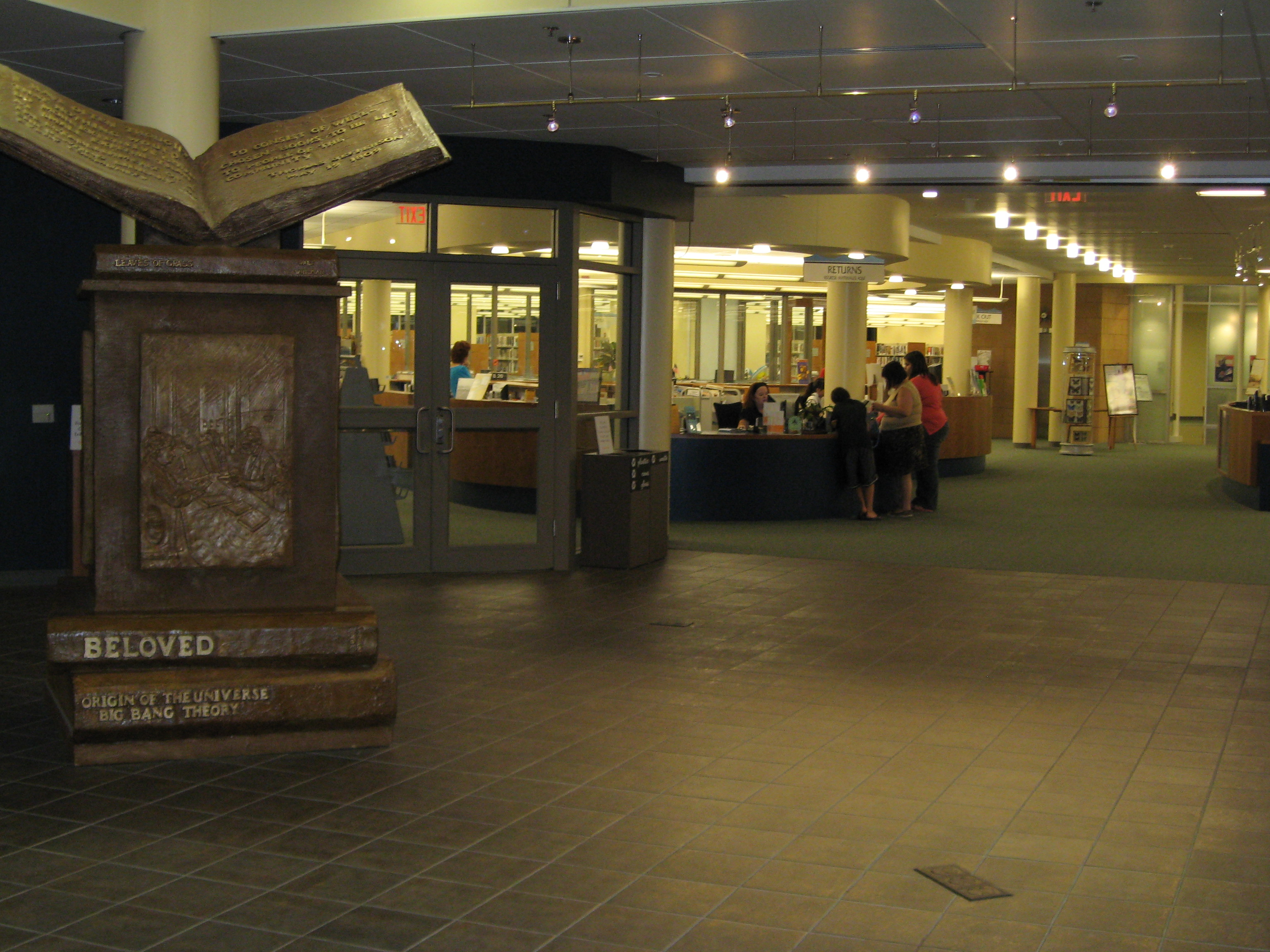
The lobby of the Toms River branch

Branches
Barnegat Branch
Bay Head Reading Center
Beachwood Branch
Berkeley Branch
Bishop Building - CLOSED (local history and genealogy collections moved to the Toms River Headquarters branch)
Brick Branch
Island Heights Branch
Jackson Branch
Lacey Township Branch
Lakewood Branch
Little Egg Harbor Branch
Long Beach Island Branch (located in Surf City)
Manchester Branch
Plumsted Branch
Pt. Pleasant Boro Branch
Pt. Pleasant Beach Branch
Stafford Branch
Toms River Headquarters Branch
Tuckerton Branch
Upper Shores Branch (located in Lavallette)
Waretown Branch
Whiting Reading Center (located in Manchester)

== Membership ==
Free membership is available to residents of Ocean County (except Beach Haven residents) as well as those who go to school in Ocean County or who own property in Ocean County. Ocean County Library card holders can obtain free Burlington County Library cards and free Monmouth County Library cards. Since Lakewood joined the county library system on January 1, 1999, only Beach Haven maintains an independent municipal library in Ocean County.

Anyone who has a valid Burlington County Library card is also eligible for a free Ocean County Library card under a reciprocal borrowing agreement. Anyone who has a valid Monmouth County Library card is also eligible for an Ocean County Library card. Many Monmouth county towns are not what Monmouth County Library calls member municipalities. Anyone who lives in a nonmember Monmouth County municipality must pay for a Monmouth County Library card before they can obtain a free Ocean County card.

== Youth Services ==
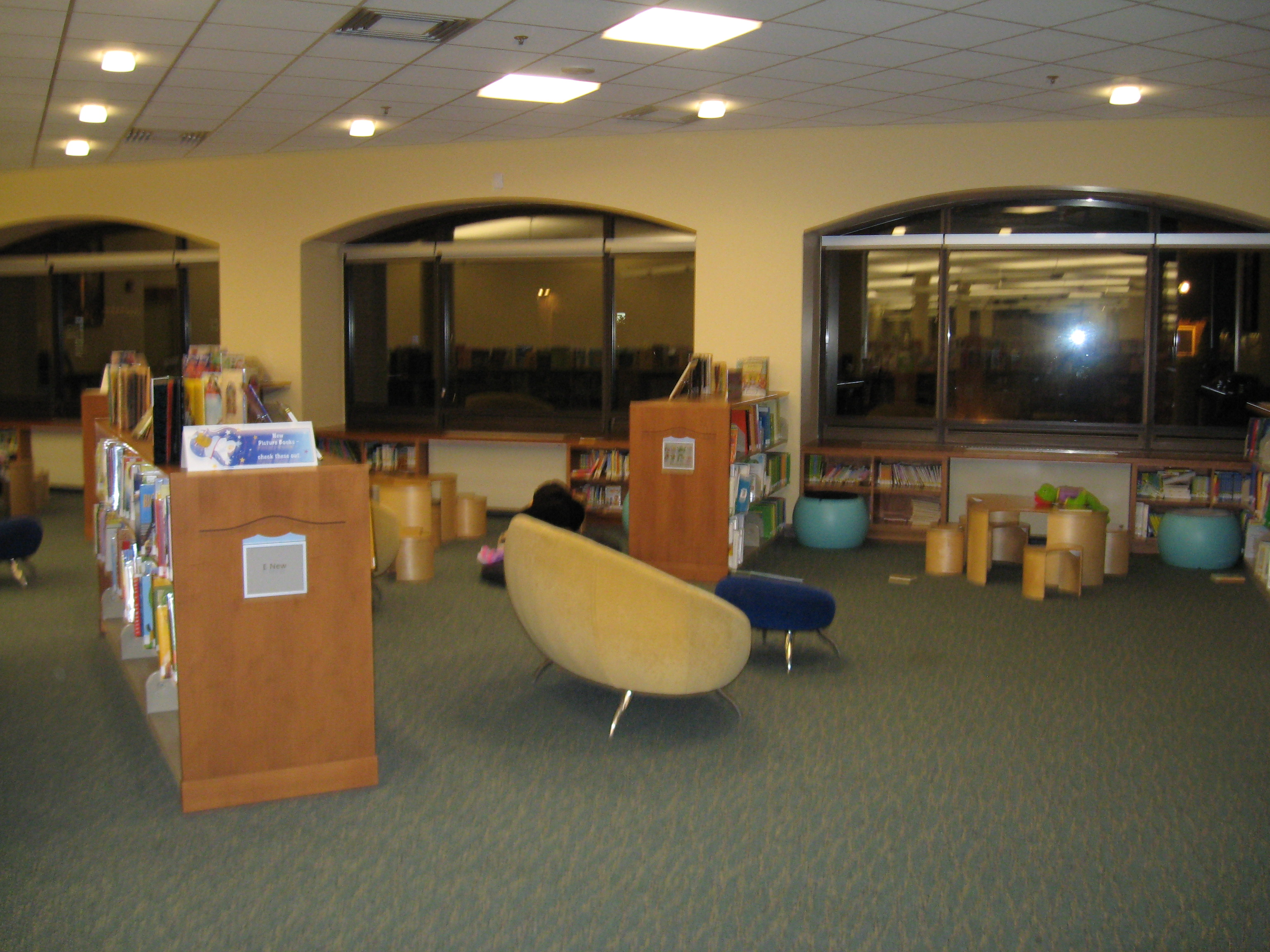
Part of the Toms River children's area, where some programs are conducted.

Each branch of the Ocean County Library offers children's materials from classics to new titles in a variety of formats. Youth Services staff organize programs for children from birth through 6th grade, including a Summer Reading Club, which encourages reading during the months that children are away from school. In 2007, an online option for participating in the reading club was offered for the first time. The reading club is supplemented by programs corresponding with each year’s summer reading theme. The programs are organized both by library staff and outside performers. Recent outside performers have included Dr. Loretta Long (Susan from Sesame Street). Many programs are designed and created by library staff including crafts, cooking programs, reading programs that match teens with younger children, and computer classes. Programs continue year round for all ages including outreach to schools and to those homeschooling.

Each branch also has a "Teen Advisory Board" (TAB). TAB was created in 1988 and offers teens chances to create and run their own program or event (with approval).

== Events and programs ==
The Ocean County Library system has offered many free author events, luncheons, and book signings, featuring authors such as Peter Maas, Sandra Brown, David Baldacci, James Patterson, Robert Pinsky, William Wegman, several Sesame Street cast members, Malachy McCourt, Barbara Taylor Bradford, Nora Roberts, Chris Elliott, Anne Perry, Anne Lamott, Laura Lippman, the TV Chef Robert Irvine and others.

The library has also hosted many free concerts featuring music of different genres. National acts such as Steve Forbert, Ron Sexsmith, Marshall Crenshaw, Glenn Tilbrook (of Squeeze), Graham Parker, NRBQ, and Julius LaRosa have appeared as well.

Additionally, events on topics from art demonstrations, Barnegat Bay ecology, local history, Meet the Mayor, sessions of the National Issues Forum, history of Television and other popular culture topics, cooking demonstrations, medical and legal issues, small business workshops and many other topics are presented at the different library locations. The Library has partnered with corporations such as HBO, Showtime, CBS, Scholastic, The Sesame Workshop, Viacom, and many others to produce special events.

== Awards ==
Ocean County Library won one of the John Cotton Dana Library Public Relation Awards for 2007 in recognition of their continuing “Hurricane Katrina--Partners in Caring" project. According to the citation, Ocean County Library has raised more than $120,000 in cash to help Hancock County Library in Mississippi. The Hancock County Library system was almost completely destroyed by Hurricane Katrina.

== Mascot ==
Since mid-2005, Ocean County Library has an official mascot called Sparks. Sparks is a large magenta dragon who loves to read and visit fairs and other special events in the county. He has also appeared at Lakewood BlueClaws baseball games with his friend and fellow mascot, Buster. The previous mascot of the library was a ship captain character called Captain Book.
