= Bayonne Public Library =

Library in Bayonne, New Jersey, United States

Coordinates: 40.671606°N 74.115384°W

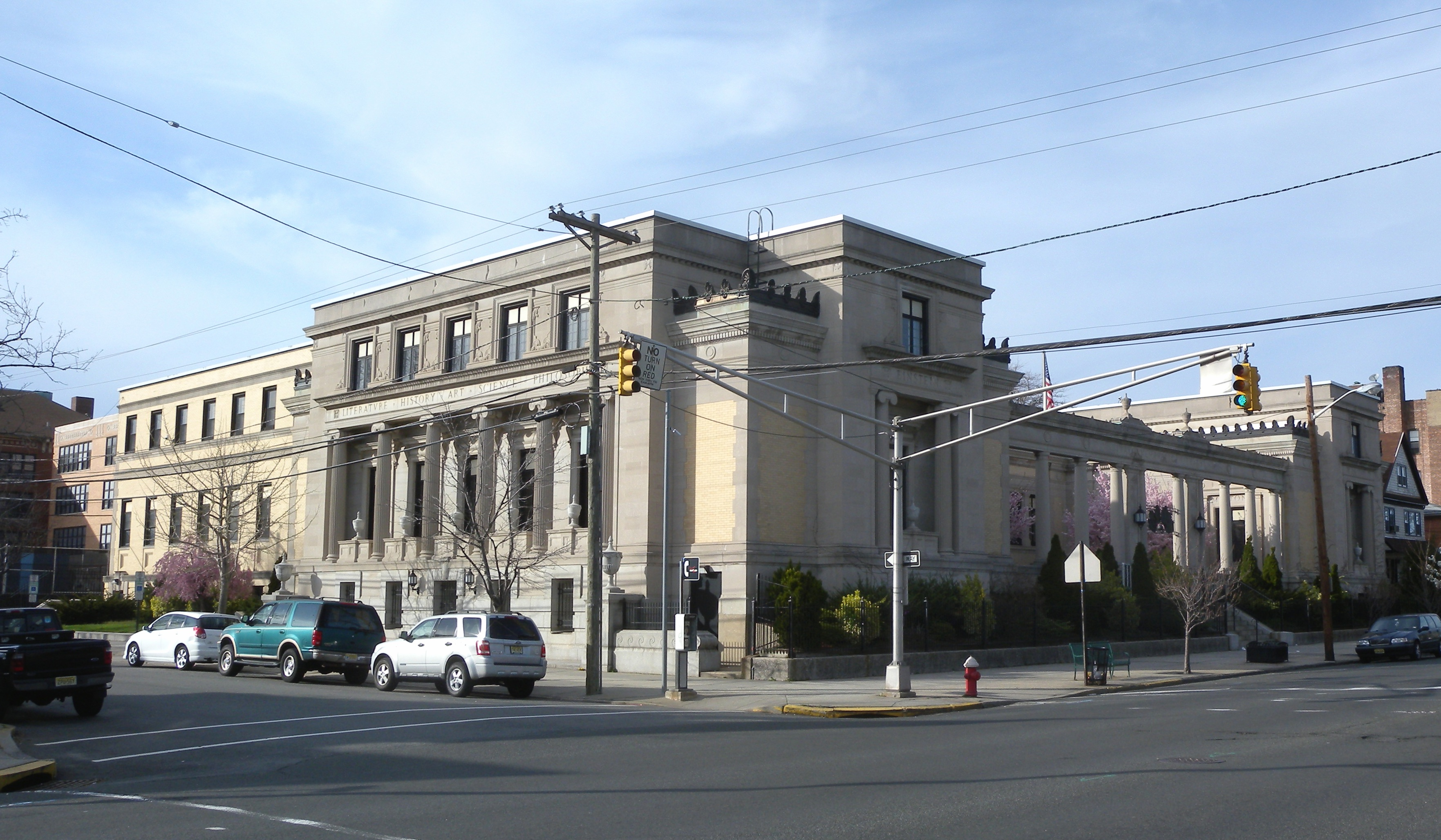
Free Public Library & Cultural Center of Bayonne is housed in the original 1903 Carnegie-funded library building

The Bayonne Public Library is the free public library of Bayonne, New Jersey. Incorporated in 1890, it serves a population of approximately 75,000.

== Carnegie building history ==
The main library is located at 697 Avenue C. The Beaux-Arts and Classical Revival style building, which sports Ionic and Doric columns and is rich in ornamental detail, has undergone expansion and renovation since its 1904 opening. It is one of New Jersey's original thirty-six Carnegie libraries which are still in use. It was constructed with a grant of $83,000 made on April 13, 1903, by the Carnegie Corporation. In 1913, Andrew Carnegie donated another $30,000 for its expansion. The present structure was completed after its final expansion at the cost of $300,000. Frank L. Bodine submitted a proposal for the original but the accepted proposal came from Edward Lippincott Tilton, who also designed the rectangular annex in 1914. Charles Shilowitz, built between 1929 and 1933, designed the addition of two wings which form a courtyard.

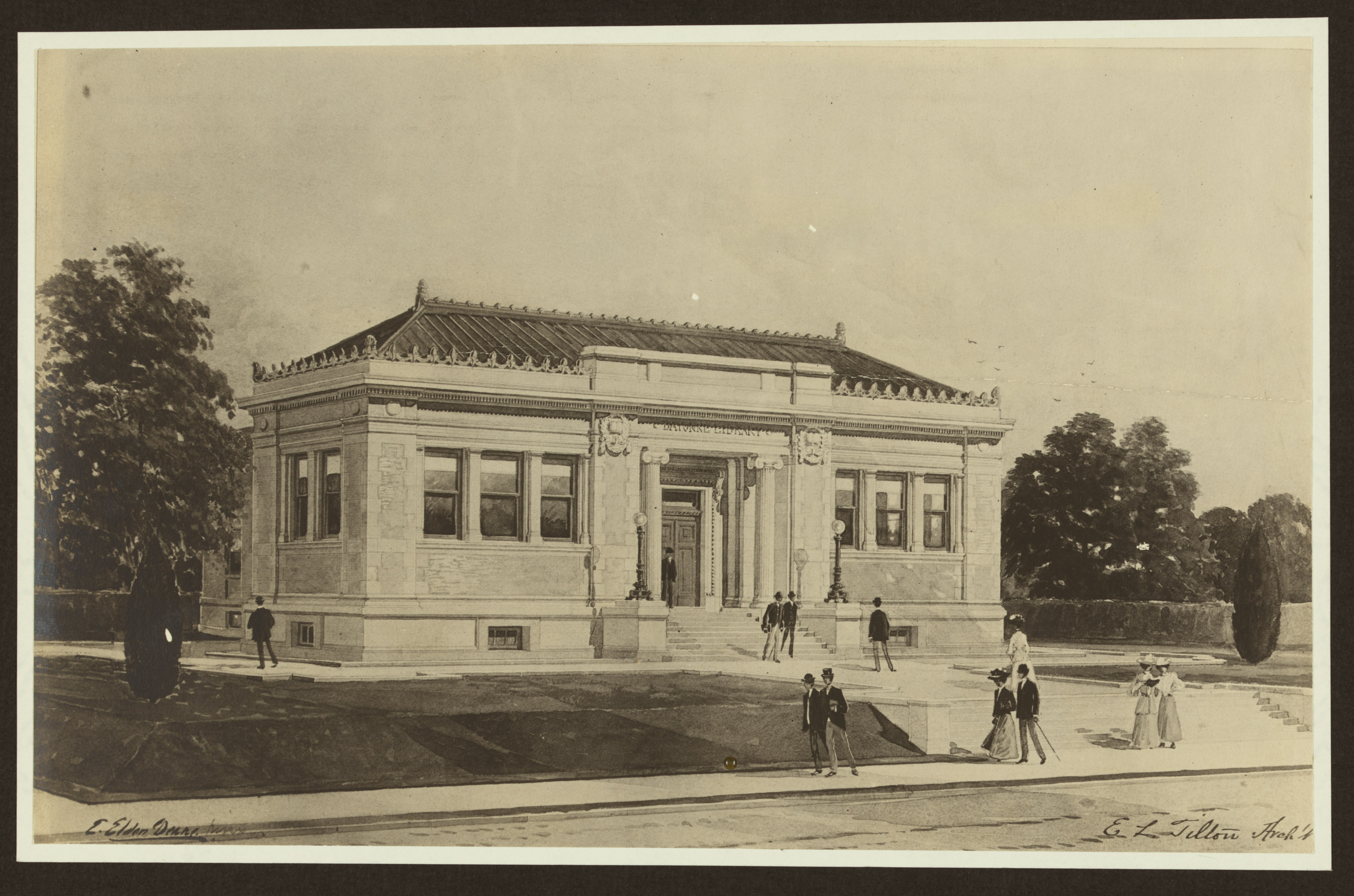
The original 1903 library

A 1959 Memorial Day fire caused the central part of the interior and roof to be badly burnt. After a $1.25 million restoration, the library re-opened to the public in 1963. The building was re-dedicated in 1989 as the Free Public Library & Cultural Center of Bayonne. Performing, visual arts, and interactive events take place at The Mary O'Connor Gallery on the second floor, while the basement level is used for meetings and other programs.

In 2023, the Library embarked upon a $3 million renovation project, partially funded by New Jersey Library Construction Bond Act funding, which included complete revamps of the Circulation area, the Reference Room, and the Children's Room, in addition to complete replacement of the boiler system and public elevator car.

In October 2024, the Library renamed its popular fiction room in honor of Bayonne native author George R.R. Martin.

== Branches and circulation ==
The Branch Two Library was located at 1055 Avenue C. The Story Court Branch was located in the Bergen Point section of the city at 16 West 4th Street. Both branches closed on March 31, 2009. As of 2011, the library system served a population of approximately 62,000 residents, contained a collection of 268,494 volumes and had a yearly circulation of 99,100 items. The Story Court Library Branch opened temporarily in 2023 as part of the renovation process to the Avenue C location.

== Library offerings ==
In 2022, the library begun using Hoopla, a digital media service, which provides eBooks, eAudiobooks, magazines, comics, and manga as well as streaming music, movies, and TV shows.

In 2022, the library also began using Mango Languages to provide online, self-paced foreign language and English as a Second Language courses.

== Local history ==
Due to its proximity to Ellis Island, Bayonne local history is often a source of information for those looking for genealogical history. In 2022, the library reached an agreement with Ancestry and Newspapers.com to digitize their local newspaper microfilm archives.

== See also ==
- Bayonne Community Museum
- List of Carnegie libraries in New Jersey
- National Register of Historic Places listings in Hudson County, New Jersey
