= Belmar Public Library =

Public library in Belmar, New Jersey, U.S.

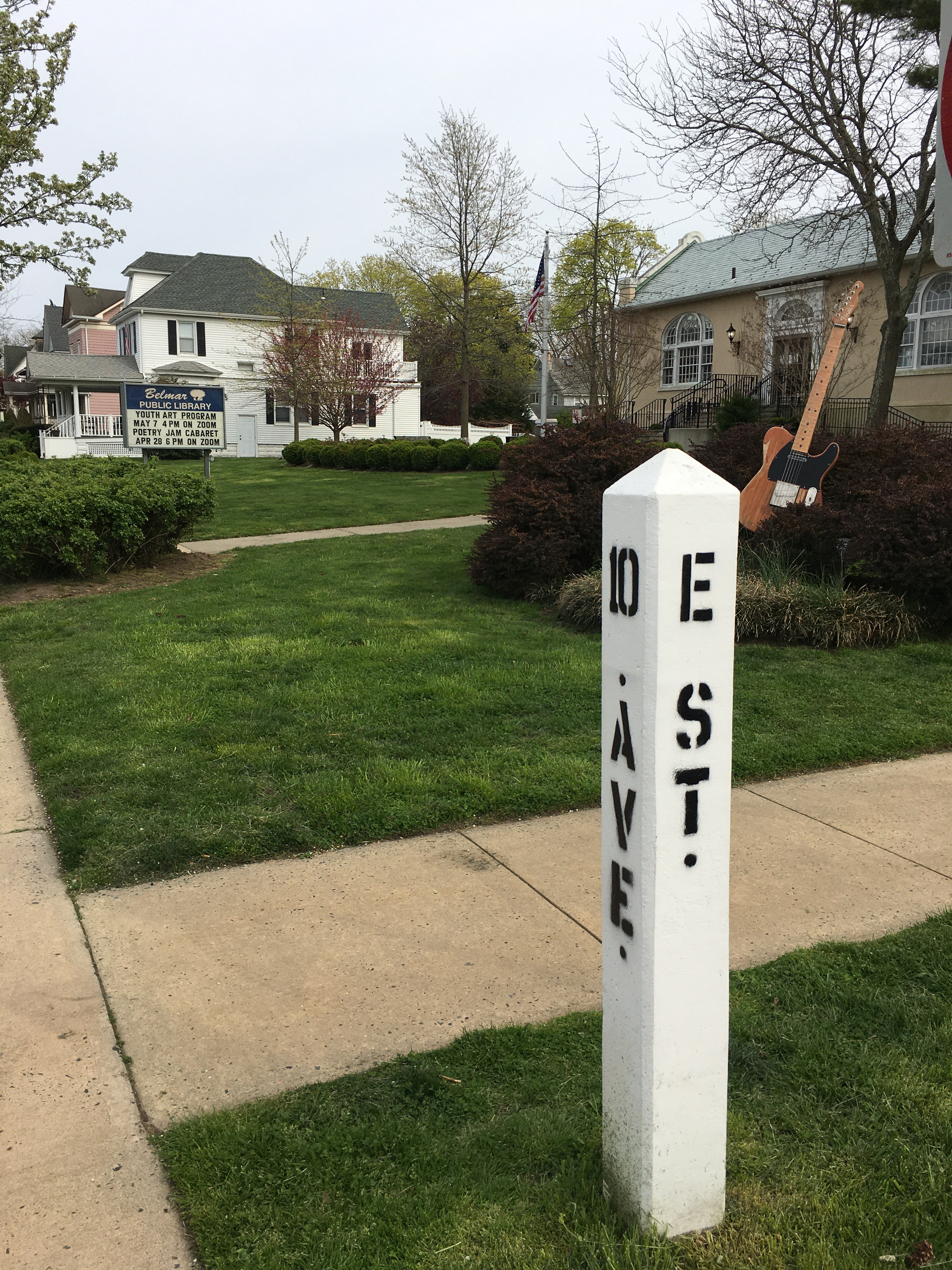
- The Belmar Public Library (right) and its activities sign (left)
- 40.178545°N 74.023341°W
- Location: Belmar, New Jersey, United States
- Type: Public library

Other information
- Website: www.belmarlibrary.org

The Belmar Public Library is the public library of Belmar, New Jersey located at 517 10th Avenue.

The library circulates about 15,000 items annually from its collection of 32,000 volumes. The Jersey Shore town in 2010 had year-round population of about 6,000. The library is one of New Jersey's original thirty-six Carnegie libraries.

The library is located at the corner of E Street and 10th Avenue in Belmar, two names later made famous by Bruce Springsteen and the E Street Band and resulting in a large replica of Springsteen's Fender Esquire guitar being placed there.

== Carnegie library ==
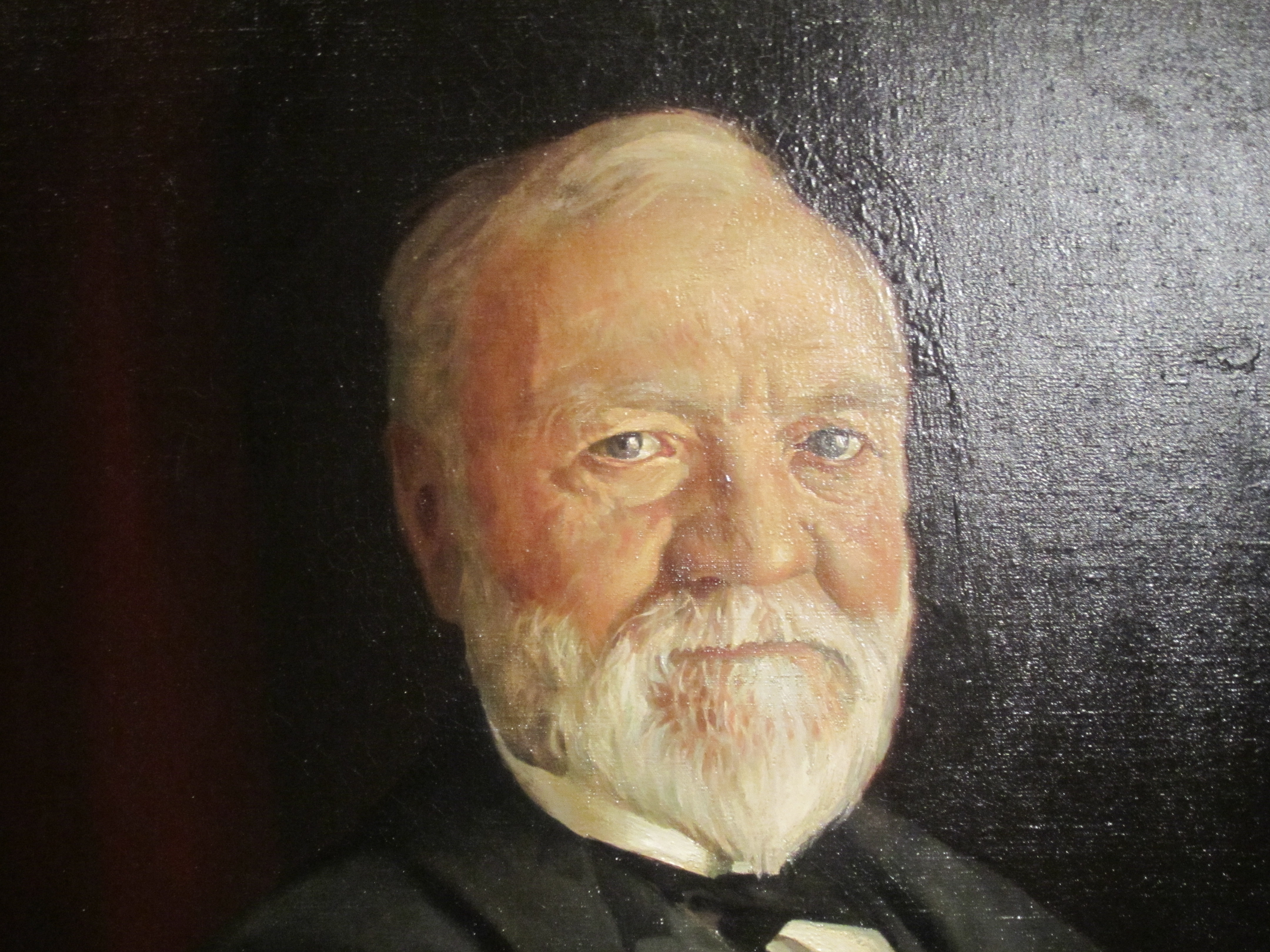
Carnegie portrait (detail) in the National Portrait Gallery

=== Founding ===
Started by a women's group, the first Belmar Library opened on Sept. 23, 1911, and saw several different locations as it expanded. It has stood at 10th Avenue and E Street since Dec. 4, 1914. The current building is one of New Jersey's original thirty-six Carnegie libraries, constructed with a grant of $13,000 made the Carnegie Corporation, still in use. Its design and layout by Edward Lippincott Tilton, who had also done Ellis Island, so impressed Andrew Carnegie, that he suggested it be used a model for and many other Carnegie libraries constructions. The current library building occupies 1,800 square feet in the upstairs portion, and about 900 square feet in the lower level media room. In 1935, the centennial of his Carnegie's birth, a copy of the portrait of him originally painted by F. Luis Mora was given to the library.

=== E Street ===
In July 2011, an eight-foot high replica of Bruce Springsteen's legendary Fender Esquire guitar was placed on the library grounds at E Street and 10th Avenue, not far from where E Street Band member David Sancious lived in the 1970s.

== See also ==
- Freehold Public Library
- List of Carnegie libraries in New Jersey
- National Register of Historic Places listings in Monmouth County, New Jersey
