= East Orange Public Library =

Public library of East Orange, Essex County, New Jersey, U.S.

Coordinates: 40.760003°N 74.211725°W

The East Orange Public Library is the free public library of East Orange, Essex County, New Jersey

== Locations and circulation ==
As of 2011, the library had a collection of 343,918 volumes, served a population of approximately 73,000 and circulated 318,748 items annually. from four locations.

- Main Library - 21 South Arlington Avenue
- Ampere Branch - Ampere Plaza
- Elmwood Branch - 317 South Clinton Street
- Franklin Branch - 192 Dodd Street

== Carnegie libraries ==
Of the library's four locations, two were originally among the thirty-six Carnegie-funded libraries in New Jersey. East Orange's original library buildings, except the Ampere Branch, were constructed in part with funds from the $116,000 in grants from the Carnegie Corporation. The former Main Branch, now a courthouse, was also a Carnegie library.

=== East Orange Municipal Court Building ===
The first of libraries built with Carnegie funding was the former Main Library. Alexander King, resident of the city and child-hood friend of Andrew Carnegie, orchestrated the first grant to be offered in New Jersey made January 18, 1900. Originally it was of source of controversy. While Carnegie offered $50,000 he also stipulated $5,000 be committed by the municipality for its upkeep, and some residents felt they would prefer to manage the city's library without Carnegie's interference and could easily make use of the recently opened library in Orange. Eventually the city purchased a lot a Main Street and South Munn Avenue where the building was constructed and opened on January 3, 1903. This original section was the work Ackerman and Ross, who also designed the library that is now houses the Historical Society of Washington, D.C. In 1914, the Carnegie Library Fund granted another $40,000 to an expansion of much needed wings, designed by Hobart A. Walker and opened the following year. Circa 1974, the building was altered and converted to the East Orange Municipal Court and later renovated again in 2009.

=== Franklin Branch Library ===
After receiving a grant of $13,000, the Franklin Branch was built, opening on August 1, 1909, at its location on Dodd Street near Watsessing Park. It was expanded in 1939.

=== Elmwood Branch Library ===
The Elmwood Branch was made possible through a $13,000 grant from the Carnegie Library Fund and opened on January 12, 1912.

== Ampere Branch ==
The Ampere Branch opened as a deposit station in 1915. After changing locations it became a branch library in 1923, and on March 17, 1931, moved to its current location across from the former Ampere Station. The building was originally built around 1914 as horse-drawn fire engine station; a second floor was added in the 1950s, and underwent renovation in 2010.

== See also ==
- List of Carnegie libraries in New Jersey
- Newark Public Library
- National Register of Historic Places listings in Essex County, New Jersey
