= Burlington County Library =

Coordinates: 40.01414°N 74.81939°W

- Established: 1921
- Branches: 1 central library, 7 branches, 8 member libraries, 2 academic branches, 1 bookmobile

Collection
- Size: 769,788 volumes

Access and use
- Circulation: 1,822,651 per year
- Population served: 354,515

Other information
- Budget: $8,838,009 (FY 2005)
- Employees: 158
- Website: www.bcls.lib.nj.us

The Burlington County Library (BCLS) is a public library system that serves 37 out of the 40 municipalities of Burlington County, New Jersey. The central headquarters is in Westampton. The library collection contains approximately 770,000 volumes, and its annual circulation was 1.8 million in 2005. The libraries of Moorestown, Mount Laurel, and Willingboro are not affiliated with the Burlington County Library System.

== History ==
In 1921, the New Jersey Legislature passed a bill providing for the creation of a county library system via referendum for Burlington County. Proponents viewed the measure as a method to distribute books to the rural community and centralize library facilities. Burlington County voters approved the referendum by 73 percent, making the Burlington County Library System the first county library in New Jersey. The library began as a small room of the Mount Holly YMCA, which functioned as the library's depository. Service consisted of delivering collections of books to various community distribution centers by a Model T library truck. In 1971, the library's new headquarters in Westampton was constructed.

== Branches ==
The library's main headquarters is in Westampton, with branches in Bordentown, Cinnaminson, Evesham, Medford, Maple Shade, Pemberton, and Riverton. The library also maintains partnerships with "member" libraries in Beverly, Burlington City, Crosswicks, Delanco, Florence, Mount Holly, Riverside, and Vincentown. The academic libraries of Burlington County College (at Pemberton campus and Mount Laurel campus) are also part of the county-wide system. A bookmobile carries over 4,000 titles around the county between July and December.

== Membership ==
All Burlington County residents, except for those residing in Moorestown, Willingboro and Mount Laurel, are eligible for free library membership. Since the Burlington County Library has reciprocal borrowing agreements with Atlantic and Ocean County libraries, cardholders of both libraries can apply for Burlington County Library membership. Likewise, Burlington County Library cardholders can apply for membership in the Atlantic and Ocean County libraries.
