= Andrew Lawson =

Canadian geologist

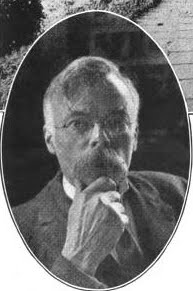
- Lawson c. 1922
- Born: July 25, 1861; Anstruther, Scotland
- Died: June 16, 1952 (aged 90); Alameda County, California, U.S.
- Known for: Report on the 1906 San Francisco earthquake
- Awards: Hayden Memorial Geological Award (1935); Penrose Medal (1938)
- Scientific career
- Fields: Geology
- Workplaces: University of California, Berkeley

Andrew Cowper Lawson (July 25, 1861 – June 16, 1952) was a Scots-born Canadian geologist who became professor of geology at the University of California, Berkeley. He was the editor and co-author of the 1908 report on the 1906 San Francisco earthquake which became known as the "Lawson Report". He was also the first person to identify and name the San Andreas Fault in 1895, and after the 1906 quake, the first to delineate the entire length of the San Andreas Fault which previously had been noted only in the San Francisco Bay Area. He also named the Franciscan Complex.

== Biography ==
Lawson was born on July 25, 1861, in Anstruther, Scotland. He moved to Hamilton, Ontario, Canada with his parents at age six. In 1883, he received his B.A. degree in natural science from the University of Toronto. He worked for the Geological Survey of Canada while pursuing his graduate degrees. He received his M.A. from the University of Toronto in 1885, and his Ph.D. from Johns Hopkins University in 1888.

In 1890, he left the Geological Survey of Canada to work as a consulting geologist in Vancouver. In October of the same year, he accepted a position as assistant professor of Mineralogy and Geology at the University of California, Berkeley. He became a full professor in 1892, and a professor emeritus from 1928 to his death on June 16, 1952.

Lawson was elected to the American Academy of Arts and Sciences in 1915, the United States National Academy of Sciences in 1924, and the American Philosophical Society in 1925. He was president of the Geological Society of America in 1926.

He was a consulting geologist for the construction of the Golden Gate Bridge in the 1930s.

His home in the La Loma Park area of the Berkeley Hills in Berkeley, California, called the "Andrew Cowper Lawson House" (1908), was especially designed for him by noted architect Bernard Maybeck to withstand earthquakes. The house is an official city designated Berkeley Landmark.

The mineral Lawsonite is named for him, as is the Lawson Adit, originally a mining construction research tunnel on UC Berkeley's campus.

Lawson Peak (elev. 13,165 feet) in Sequoia National Park was officially named after him in 1976. Lawson Hill (elev. 1,128 feet), located west of the Briones Hills in Contra Costa County, California, is named for him.
