= List of churches that are National Historic Landmarks in the United States =

This is a list of churches that are U.S. National Historic Landmarks (NHLs) in the United States. This list does not include chapels that are not or have not historically been affiliated with congregations or churches. Nor does it include churches that are contributing properties to National Historic Landmark Districts and not listed individually as NHLs.

A significant proportion of the 2,430 National Historic Landmarks sites in the U.S. are churches.

== List ==
Church	Image	Built	Designated	Location	Description	Affiliation
San Jose de los Jemez Mission		1621–26	2012	Jemez Springs, NM	Spanish Colonial	Roman Catholic
San Estévan del Rey Mission Church		1629	1970	Acoma Pueblo, NM	Spanish Colonial	Roman Catholic
Mission San Luis de Apalachee (destroyed)		1656	1966	Leon County, FL		Roman Catholic
Old Ship Church		1681	1960	Hingham, MA	Vernacular	Puritan, Unitarian Universalist
St. Luke's Church		1682	1960	Smithfield, VA		Anglican
Old Dutch Church of Sleepy Hollow		1685	1961	Sleepy Hollow, NY		Dutch Reformed Church
Old Quaker Meeting House of Queens		1694–1719	1967	Queens, New York City, NY		Society of Friends
Merion Friends Meeting House		c. 1695–1715	1999	Merion Station, PA		Society of Friends
Holy Trinity Church		1698	1961	Wilmington, DE	Georgian	Church of Sweden
St. Peter's Church		1703	2012	Talleysville, VA	Georgian	Episcopal
Yeocomico Church		1706	1970	Westmoreland County, VA		Episcopal
Bruton Parish Church		1711	1970	Williamsburg, VA	Georgian	Episcopal
St. James Church, Goose Creek		1713–19	1970	Goose Creek, SC		Episcopal
Old North Church		1723	1961	Boston, MA	Georgian	Episcopal
Trinity Church, Newport		1726	1968	Newport, RI	Georgian	Episcopal
Christ Church, Philadelphia		1727–44		Philadelphia, PA	Georgian	Episcopal
Old South Meeting House		1729	1960	Boston, MA	Georgian	Congregational
Mission Concepcion		1731	1970	San Antonio, TX	Spanish Colonial	Roman Catholic
Christ Church		1732–35	1961	Lancaster County, VA	Georgian	Episcopal
St. John's Episcopal Church		1741	1961	Richmond, VA		Episcopal
Augustus Lutheran Church		1743–45	1967	Trappe, Pennsylvania		Lutheran
Alamo Mission in San Antonio		1744–57	1960	San Antonio, TX	Spanish Colonial	Roman Catholic
Los Santos Ángeles de Guevavi (ruins)		1751	1990	Nogales, AZ	Spanish Colonial	Roman Catholic
Aquia Church		1751–55	1991	Stafford, VA	Georgian	Episcopal
St. Michael's Episcopal Church		1751–61	1960	Charleston, SC	Georgian	Episcopal
Old Sheldon Church (ruins)		1753	1970	Beaufort County, SC		Episcopal
King's Chapel		1754	1974	Boston, MA	Georgian	Anglican, Unitarian
Calabasas (ruins)		1756	1990	Santa Cruz County, AZ	Spanish Colonial	Roman Catholic
Harpswell Meetinghouse		1757	1968	Harpswell, ME	Vernacular	
St. Peter's Episcopal Church, Philadelphia		1758	1996	Philadelphia, PA		Episcopal
Christ Church, Cambridge		1760–61	1960	Cambridge, MA		Episcopal
San José de Gracia Church		1760–76	1970	Las Trampas, NM	Spanish Colonial	Roman Catholic
Christ Church, Alexandria		1765–73	1970	Alexandria, VA	Georgian	Episcopal
St. Paul's Chapel		1766	1960	Manhattan, New York, NY	Late Georgian	Episcopal
St. Stephen's Episcopal Church		1767	1970	St. Stephen, South Carolina	Georgian	Episcopal
Buckingham Friends Meeting House		1768	2003	Buckingham Township, Bucks County, PA	Colonial	Society of Friends
St. James Episcopal Church, Santee		1768	1970	Santee, SC	Georgian	Episcopal
First Church of Christ, Congregational, Farmington		1771	1975	Farmington, CT		Congregational
Mission San Antonio de Padua		1771	1976	Monterey County, CA	Spanish Colonial	Roman Catholic
San Francisco de Asís Mission Church		1772–1816	1970	Ranchos de Taos, NM	Spanish Colonial	Roman Catholic
First Baptist Church in America		1775	1960	Providence, RI	Georgian	Baptist
Mission San Xavier del Bac		1783–97	1960	Pima County, AZ	Spanish Colonial	Roman Catholic
Unitarian Church in Charleston		1787	1976	Charleston, SC	Gothic Revival	Unitarian Universalist
Rockingham Meeting House		1787-1801	2000	Rockingham, VT	Vernacular	Congregational
Cathedral of San Carlos Borromeo		1791–95	1960	Monterey, CA	Spanish Colonial	Roman Catholic
Cathedral Basilica of St. Augustine		1793–97	1970	St. Augustine, FL	Spanish Colonial	Roman Catholic
Mission San Carlos Borromeo de Carmelo		1797	1960	Carmel-by-the-Sea, CA	Spanish Colonial	Roman Catholic
Church of the Holy Family, Cahokia		1799	1970	Cahokia, IL	Poteaux-sur-sol	Roman Catholic
African Meeting House		1806	1974	Boston, MA		Baptist
Old West Church		1806	1970	Boston, MA	Georgian	Congregational, Methodist
St. Mary's Seminary Chapel		1806–08	1971	Baltimore, MD	Gothic Revival	Roman Catholic
Mission San Diego de Alcalá		1808–13	1970	San Diego, CA	Spanish Colonial	Roman Catholic
Monumental Church		1812	1971	Richmond, VA	Greek Revival	Episcopal
Round Church, Richmond		1812–13	1996	Richmond, VT	Vernacular	
Mission Santa Barbara		1812–20	1960	Santa Barbara, CA	Spanish Colonial	Roman Catholic
La Purisima Mission		1813	1970	Lompoc, CA	Spanish Colonial	Roman Catholic
Santuario de Chimayo		1814–16	1970	Chimayó, NM	Spanish Colonial	Roman Catholic
Mission San Luis Rey de Francia		1815	1970	Oceanside, CA	Spanish Colonial	Roman Catholic
St. John's Episcopal Church, Lafayette Square		1815–1816	1960	Washington, DC	Greek Revival	Episcopal
First Church of Christ, Unitarian		1816	1970	Lancaster, MA	Federal	Congregational, Unitarian Universalist
Mission San Miguel Arcángel		1816–18	2006	San Miguel, San Luis Obispo County, CA	Spanish Colonial	Roman Catholic
Mission Santa Inés		1817	1999	Solvang, CA	Spanish Colonial	Roman Catholic
First Unitarian Church of Baltimore		1817	1972	Baltimore, MD	Neoclassical	Unitarian Universalist
Cathedral Church of St. Paul		1819	1970	Boston, MA	Greek Revival	Episcopal
Bethesda Presbyterian Church		1822	1985	Camden, SC 34°14′46″N 80°36′19″W	Neoclassical	Presbyterian
United First Parish Church		1828	1970	Quincy, MA	Greek Revival	Unitarian Universalist
Kirtland Temple		1833–38	1976	Kirtland, OH	Greek Revival, Federal	Mormon, Community of Christ
Dutch Reformed Church, Newburgh		1835–37	2001	Newburgh, NY	Greek Revival	Dutch Reformed Church
St. Philip's Church, Charleston		1835–50	1973	Charleston, SC	Late Georgian	Episcopal, Anglican Church in North America
Kawaiahaʻo Church		1836–42	1962	Honolulu, HI	Mediterranean Revival	United Church of Christ
Government Street Presbyterian Church		1836–37	1992	Mobile, AL 30°41′22″N 88°2′37″W	Greek Revival	Presbyterian
St. Ignace Mission		1837		St. Ignace, MI	Vernacular	Roman Catholic
St. Patrick's Church, New Orleans		1837–40		New Orleans, LA	Gothic Revival	Roman Catholic
Trinity Church, Manhattan		1839–46	1976	Manhattan, New York, NY	Gothic Revival	Episcopal
Church of the Ascension, Episcopal		1840–41	1987	Manhattan, New York, NY	Gothic Revival	Episcopal
Grace Church, Manhattan		1843–46	1977	Manhattan, New York, NY	Gothic Revival	Episcopal
Old Whaler's Church		1844	1994	Sag Harbor, NY 40°59′50″N 72°17′39″W	Egyptian Revival	Presbyterian
Huguenot Church		1844	1973	Charleston, SC	Gothic Revival	Reformed Church of France
St. Michael's Cathedral, Sitka		1844–48	1962	Sitka, AK	Russian	Russian Orthodox
St. Ann & the Holy Trinity Church		1844–47	1987	Brooklyn, New York City, NY	Gothic Revival	Episcopal
Church of St. James the Less		1846	1985	Philadelphia, PA	Gothic Revival	Episcopal
St. Mary's Episcopal Church, Burlington		1846–64	1986	Burlington, NJ	Gothic Revival	Episcopal
St. George's Episcopal Church		1846–56	1976	Manhattan, New York, NY	Romanesque Revival	Episcopal
St. Mark's Episcopal Church		1847–48	1985	Philadelphia, PA	Gothic Revival	Episcopal
Grace Church, Newark		1847–48	1987	Newark, NJ	Gothic Revival	Episcopal
Cataldo Mission		1848	1961	Cataldo, ID	Greek Revival	Roman Catholic
Downtown Presbyterian Church of Nashville		1848–49	1993	Nashville, TN	Egyptian Revival	Presbyterian
Christ Episcopal Church, Raleigh		1848–53	1987	Raleigh, NC	Gothic Revival	Episcopal
Plymouth Church, Brooklyn		1849	1966	Brooklyn, New York City, NY		Congregational
St. Paul's Cathedral, Buffalo		1849–51	1987	Buffalo, NY	Gothic Revival	Episcopal
Church of the Holy Cross		1850–52	1973	Stateburg, SC	Gothic Revival	Episcopal, Anglican Church in North America
Old Dutch Church, Kingston		1851–52	2008	Kingston, NY	Renaissance Revival	
St. Andrew's Episcopal Church		1853	1973	Prairieville, AL	Carpenter Gothic	Episcopal
St. Alphonsus Church, New Orleans		1855–57	1996	New Orleans, LA	Italianate	Roman Catholic
Race Street Friends Meetinghouse		1856	1993	Philadelphia, PA		Society of Friends
United Congregational Church of Newport		1857	2012	Newport, RI	Romanesque Revival	Congregational
First Baptist Church of Columbia		1859	1973	Columbia, SC	Greek Revival	Baptist
Christ Church Cathedral, St. Louis		1859	1994	St. Louis, MO	Greek Revival	Episcopal
St. Patrick's Cathedral, Manhattan		1858–78	1976	Manhattan, New York, NY	Gothic Revival	Roman Catholic
Episcopal Church of the Nativity		1859	1990	Huntsville, AL	Gothic Revival	Episcopal
St. Peter's Episcopal Church, Albany		1859–76	1980	Albany, NY	Gothic Revival	Episcopal
St. Mary's Assumption Church		1860	1974	New Orleans, LA	German Baroque Revival	Roman Catholic
All Saint's Memorial Church		1863–4	1987	Navesink, NJ	Gothic Revival	Episcopal
Tolson's Chapel and School		1866	2021	Sharpsburg, MD	Vernacular	A.M.E.
Church of the Covenant, Boston		1867	2012	Boston, MA	Gothic Revival	United Church of Christ
St. Mark's Episcopal Church, Jim Thorpe		1869	1987	Jim Thorpe, PA	Gothic Revival	Episcopal
Trinity Church, Boston		1872	1970	Boston, MA	Richardsonian Romanesque	Episcopal
Old South Church		1873	1970	Boston, MA		United Church of Christ
Andrews Methodist Episcopal Church		1873	1992	Grafton, WV		Methodist Episcopal Church
Second Presbyterian Church, Chicago		1874	2013	Chicago, IL	Gothic Revival	Presbyterian
St. Luke's Episcopal Church		1876–80	1976	Washington, DC		Episcopal
Dexter Avenue Baptist Church		1883–89	1974	Montgomery, AL		Baptist
Emmanuel Episcopal Church		1884–86	2000	Pittsburgh, PA	Richardsonian Romanesque	Episcopal
Church of the Advocate		1887	1996	Philadelphia, PA	Gothic Revival	Episcopal
Mother Bethel A.M.E. Church		1890	1972	Philadelphia, PA	Romanesque Revival	A.M.E.
Thompson A.M.E. Zion Church (Harriet Tubman NHP)		1891	1974	Auburn, NY		A.M.E. Zion
Circular Congregational Church		1892	1973	Charleston, SC	Greek Revival, Romanesque Revival	United Church of Christ
Church of the Holy Ascension		1894	1970	Unalaska, AK	Russian	Russian Orthodox
Swedenborgian Church		1895	2004	San Francisco, CA	Arts and Crafts	Swedenborgian
Holy Assumption of the Virgin Mary Church		1895–96	1970	Kenai, AK	Russian	Russian Orthodox
Centennial Baptist Church		1905	2003	Helena–West Helena, AR	Gothic Revival	Baptist
Unity Temple		1905–08	1970	Oak Park, Illinois	Modern	Unitarian Universalist
Brown Chapel A.M.E. Church		1908	1982	Selma, AL	Romanesque Revival	A.M.E.
St. John's Presbyterian Church		1910	1974	Berkeley, CA	American Craftsman	Presbyterian
First Church of Christ, Scientist, Berkeley		1910	1977	Berkeley, CA	American Craftsman	Christian Scientist
16th Street Baptist Church		1911	2006	Birmingham, AL	Romanesque Revival	Baptist
Angelus Temple		1923	1992	Los Angeles, CA		Pentecostal
Bethel Baptist Church		1926	2005	Birmingham, AL		Baptist
Boston Avenue Methodist Church		1927	1999	Tulsa, OK	Art Deco	United Methodist
First Christian Church of Columbus, Indiana		1942	2001	Columbus, IN	Modern	
Christ Church Lutheran		1948	2009	Minneapolis, MN	Modern	Lutheran
First Unitarian Society of Madison		1949–51	2004	Shorewood Hills, Wisconsin	Modern	Unitarian Universalist
Fish Church		1958	2021	Stamford, CT		Presbyterian
North Christian Church		1964	2000	Columbus, IN	Modern	Disciples of Christ
First Baptist Church of Columbus		1965	2000	Columbus, IN	Modern	Baptist
Our Lady of Guadalupe Church, San Jose		1968	2016	San Jose, CA		Roman Catholic

== Former NHLs ==
Church	Image	Built	Designated	Withdrawn	Location	Description
Fort Ross Chapel		c. 1820	1969	1971	Sonoma County, CA	Withdrawn from the NHL listings after a fire destroyed most of the building in 1970.
