= Berkeley Faculty Club =

Historic place in Berkeley, California

- Faculty Club
- U.S. National Register of Historic Places
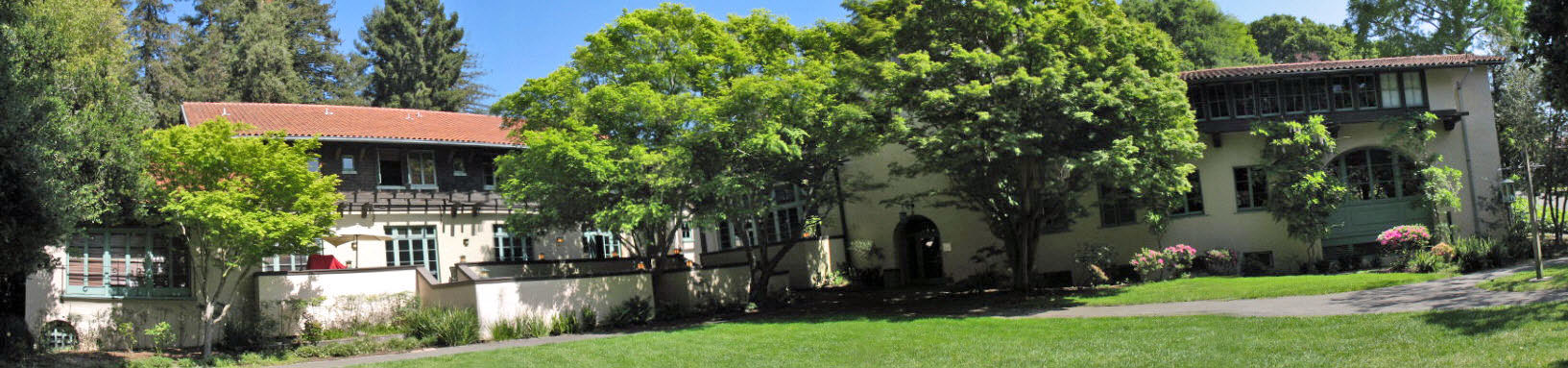
- Exterior view of The Faculty Club as seen from Faculty Glade

- Location within Oakland, California Location within California Location within the United States
- Location: Oxford Street, Berkeley, California
- Coordinates: 37°52′18.5″N 122°15′21.0″W
- Built: 1902; 124 years ago
- Architect: Bernard Maybeck
- NRHP reference No.: 82004641
- Added to NRHP: March 25, 1982

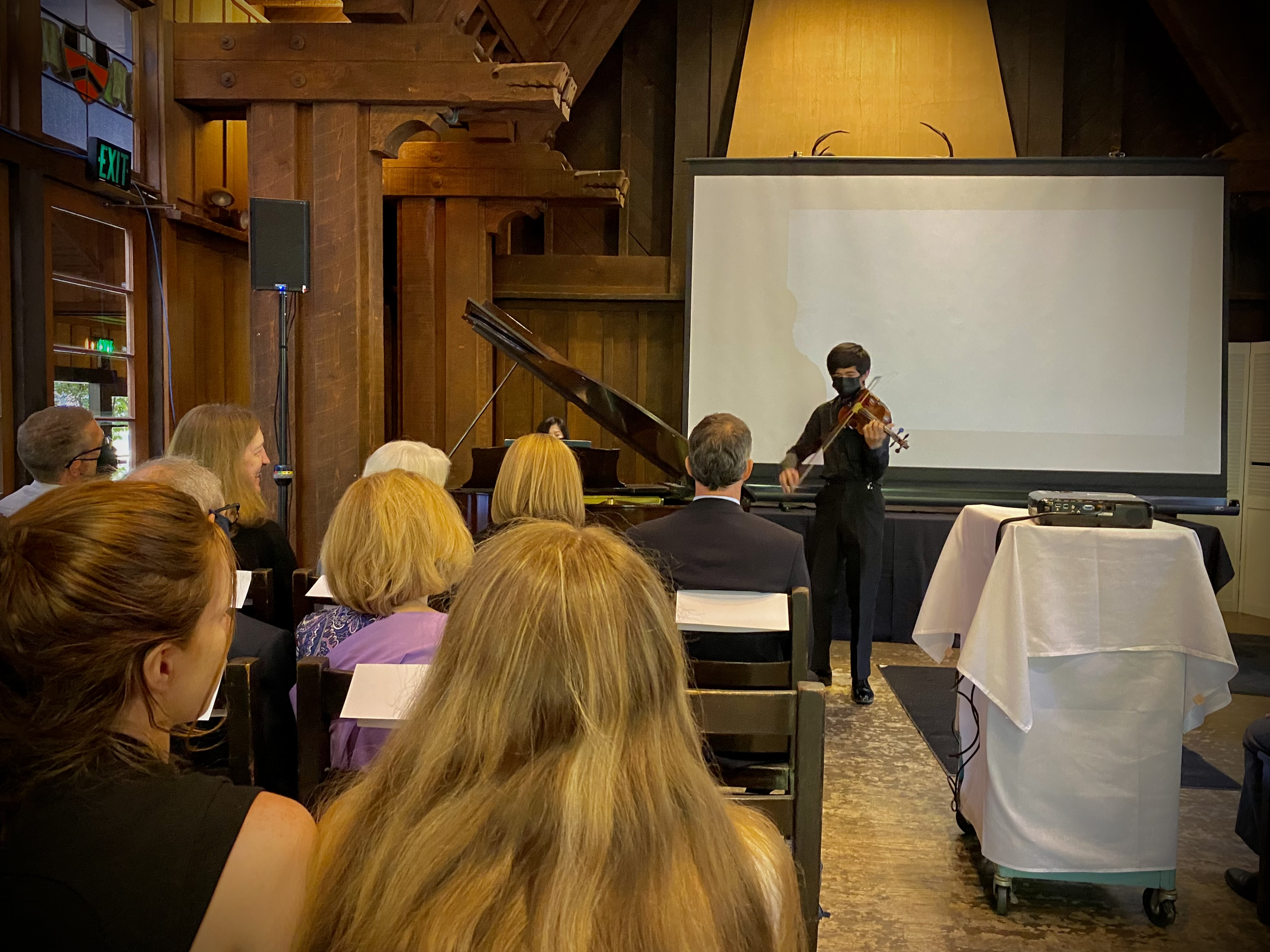
The Great Hall

The Faculty Club of the University of California at Berkeley, or Faculty Club at UC Berkeley, is a private members' club located on the University of California, Berkeley campus in Berkeley, California.

In 1982, The Faculty Club was placed on the National Register of Historic Places (NPS-82000960). It is also a California Historical Landmark and it is listed in the California Register of Historical Resources. Historical and contemporary artwork can be found in the meeting rooms and main corridor of the club from artists such as Ray Boynton, Chiura Obata, and Jacques Schnier.

== Architecture ==
The Faculty Club was originally built in 1902 to designs by noted Bay Area architect Bernard Maybeck in the American Craftsman style as what is now the Great Hall. Subsequent additions such as architect John Galen Howard's lounge with double fireplace to the south, and kitchen and dining rooms designed by Warren Perry and remodeled by W. S. Wellington, significantly expanded the building's footprint.

It is located on Faculty Glade, adjacent to Strawberry Creek. While excavating what is now Faculty Glade before construction, a variety of Ohlone artifacts and skeletons were uncovered.

== Membership ==
The Faculty Club started as a dining association and then a gentleman's club. The club permitted women only as honorary members or visitors until 1972, (women were restricted from the main dining room until 1969) when members voted to "eliminate all discrimination against female membership in the club". It is located west of the Women's Faculty Club, which opened its doors in 1923 and maintains reciprocity with the Faculty Club today.

Today, active membership is available, upon approval by the board of directors, to current or retired faculty, "researchers, administrators and career staff" associated with the University of California (UC), and associate membership is open to UC alumni.

== Paranormal activity ==
Over the years, many stories have circulated about The Faculty Club – and specifically Room 219 – as the site of reported paranormal activity. According to A History of the Faculty Club by James Gilbert Paltridge, students reported hearing history professor Henry Morse Stephens, who lived in the west wing for over two decades until he died in 1919, reciting lines of poetry from his window.

In March 1974, Keio University professor Noriyuki Tokuda told The Berkeley Gazette that he had seen a "very gentlemanly" man sitting on a chair watching him while he was half asleep, while staying in Room 19 of The Faculty Club. At the time, he was told that the room had been occupied for 36 years by a professor who died in March 1971. A copy of the Gazette article was framed and hung in the club's offices.

In 2009, a psychic medium visited the Spirit Tower of The Faculty Club with a journalism student. While he failed to "connect" with the ghost of Professor Stephens, he claimed to interview a ghost affiliated with the 1920 football team – either the captain, the coach, or both – who purportedly shared that he had died of pneumonia and criticized modern football, but nevertheless "ended ... the interview with a hearty 'Go Bears!'".

== The UC Monks ==
Since 1902 the UC Monks, an organized men's choir based at the Faculty Club, has performed Christmas concerts to large audiences in the main dining room of the club. Tickets for members go on sale in late fall for the Thursday and Friday performances, taking place the first week of December. While guests enjoy drinks and a formal sit-down dinner, the Monks perform Christmas carols, drinking songs, and an evening-closing sing-along of Handels' Messiah.

== Facilities ==
Today's facility includes lodging, dining, conference rooms, and event facilities which are open to members and non-members.

As a venue, the club has hosted weddings, receptions and special events.

The Club has been the meeting place of Berkeley's Arts Club, Folk-lore Club, and the exclusive History of Science Dinner Club at Berkeley.

== Notable members ==
- Henry Morse Stephens
- Clark Kerr
- John Galen Howard
- Wendell M. Latimer
- Edward C. Tolman
- J. Robert Oppenheimer
- Phoebe Hearst
- Eugene Neuhaus

== See also ==
- List of gentlemen's clubs in the United States
- Membership discrimination in California social clubs
