= Bruce Porter =

American artist

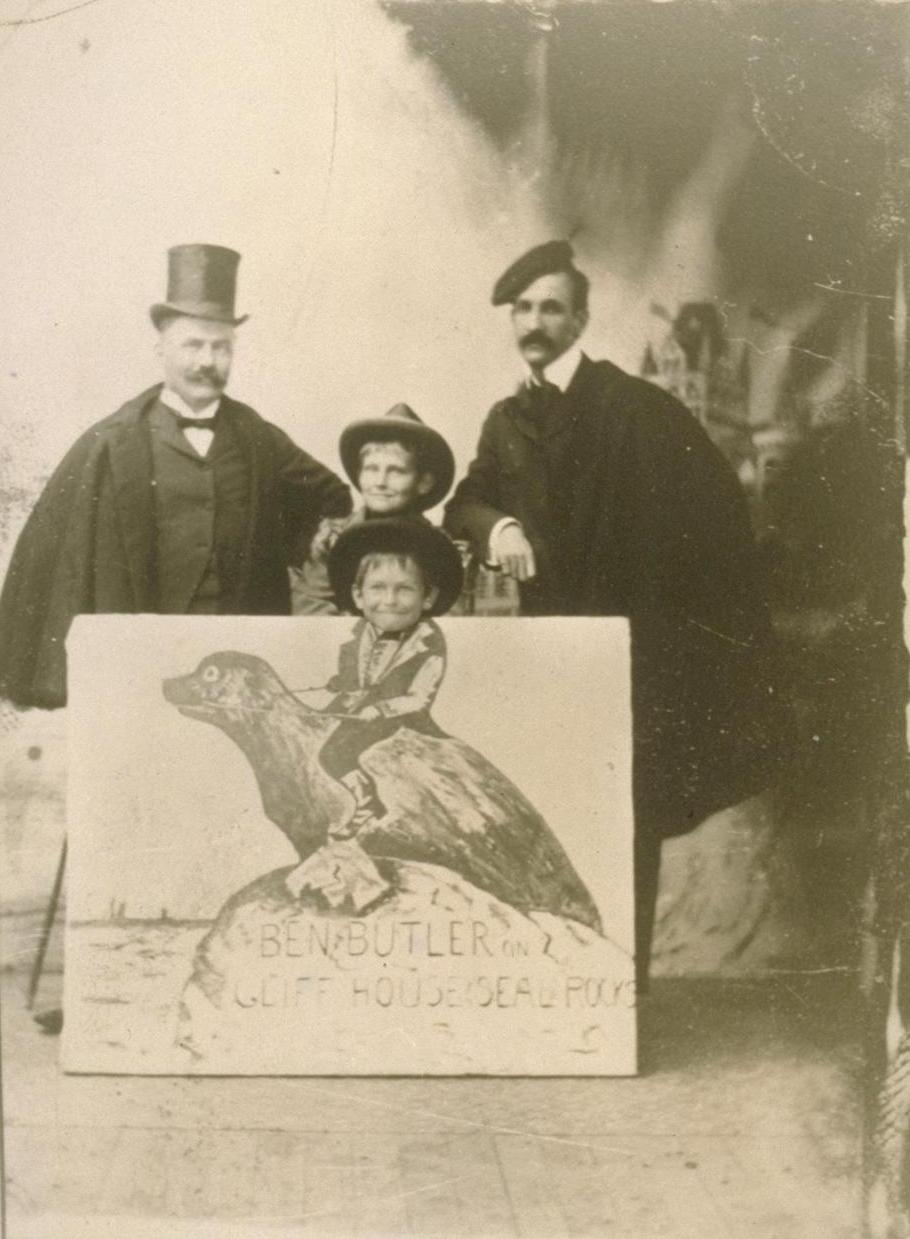
Bruce Porter (right), with Robert Waybur and Waybur's sons

Bruce Porter (23 February 1865, San Francisco – 25 November 1953, San Francisco) was an American painter, sculptor, stained-glass designer, writer, muralist, landscape designer, and art critic.

== Biography ==
Porter was raised on a ranch in the East Bay town of Martinez. His father Charles Bruce Porter (1817-1894), a Mayflower descendant and an associate of the Transcendentalist community in Massachusetts, came to California during the Gold Rush. He established a large ranch in Martinez, edited the local newspaper and became involved in politics and real estate. Porter's mother Annie Williamson Porter (1834-1924), raised Irish Catholic, brought her six children up in the Unitarian Church.

Bruce Porter later received education in San Francisco, Paris, London, and Venice. He married Margaret Mary “Peggy” James (1887-1950), niece of Henry James, on October 6, 1917, at the Swedenborgian Church in Cambridge, Massachusetts and moved to San Francisco soon thereafter.

=== Artist ===
His tonalist paintings, which are rare, include Man and Nature (1903) and Presidio Cliffs which was exhibited at the Panama–Pacific International Exposition (1915). His many murals include those at the Pacific Union Club on Nob Hill and the First Unitarian Church of San Francisco.

Porter's sculptures include the Robert Louis Stevenson monument at Portsmouth Square in San Francisco, and the Memorial Arch (1919) on Saratoga-Los Gatos Road in Saratoga, California.

=== Designer ===
Some of Porter's stained-glass designs can be found at St Mary's Episcopal Church in Pacific Grove, California, and in San Francisco at the Swedenborgian Church (1895, Bernard Maybeck), and the Le Petit Trianon mansion (1904). Other stained-glass windows he designed are at churches in Monterey, Stockton, San Mateo and Coronado.

As a landscape designer, Porter created the gardens at the Filoli estate (1917) in Woodside, California, designed the landscape of the Memorial Stadium at the University of California at Berkeley (1923), and was the garden designer for several private residences.

=== Author ===
Porter also wrote art criticism columns for local newspapers. For two years, 1895 to 1897, Porter, along with Gelett Burgess and William Doxey, published the literary magazine The Lark. Porter also contributed to Arts in California (1916), a book that compiled the art works exhibited at the Panama–Pacific International Exposition.
