= Edna Deakin =

American architect

- Born: 1871; California, U.S.
- Died: 1946
- Education: University of California, Berkeley
- Occupation: Architect
- Father: Edwin Deakin

Edna Deakin (1871–1946) was an American designer, and one of the earliest women architects in the United States of America. She is best known for remodeling the "Temple of the Wings" building in Berkeley, California.

== Life ==
Edna Deakin was born in the area of San Francisco, California. She was the daughter of the British-American painter Edwin Deakin and the niece of the architect Frederick H. Daken. She studied mechanics at the University of California, Berkeley, but dropped out to study architecture with her cousin Clarence Dakin (whose family spelled the name differently) at the classes of John Galen Howard.

== Architectural work ==
After her studies, Deakin worked in the offices of Dickey and Reed (C. W. Dickey) and for the architect George T. Plowman. She advertised herself as a "designer" and collaborated with her cousin. They may have been involved with the design of the Studio Building in Berkeley, which was built by Clarence's father.

Deakin and Clarence collaborated on restoration of an unusual Berkeley building known as the "Temple of Wings." Originally designed in 1911 as a house without any walls by Bernard Maybeck and A. Randolph Monroe, the "Temple of Wings" building suffered serious fire damage in 1923. The original Corinthian columns that had held up the roof survived and were used in Deakin and Clarence's remodel. They worked out a plan to enclose the structure, building living areas with ground-floor dance studios on both sides of an open courtyard.

She also designed the D(e)akin family property at Telegraph and Woolsey in Berkeley.

== See also ==
- List of California women architects
