= Katharine Felton =

Katharine Felton

Katharine Conway "Kitty" Felton (July 7, 1873 – August 8, 1940) was the head of Associated Charities in San Francisco at the turn of the 20th century.

Felton was born in Oakland, California, on July 7, 1873, the daughter of a prominent San Francisco Bay Area family. Her father, John Brooks Felton, was a judge and mayor of Oakland and has the Santa Cruz County town of Felton, California named after him. She was called "the conscience of the city" because of her dedication to social work.

In 1901, at the age of 28, Felton was appointed director of Associated Charities (now the Felton Institute--formerly the Family Service Agency of San Francisco). In 1902, she created the Children's Service Agency of San Francisco, which developed the first foster care system in California. Felton drafted nearly all of the State's early legislation covering welfare and relief according to the "Proceedings of the National Conference of Social Work", Volume 13, 1901. In 1928, with the help of her friend, architect Bernard Maybeck, she built what was the office building of Family Service Agency at 1010 Gough Street in San Francisco.

She died of cancer on August 8, 1940.
