= Temple of Wings =

Historic house in Berkeley, California

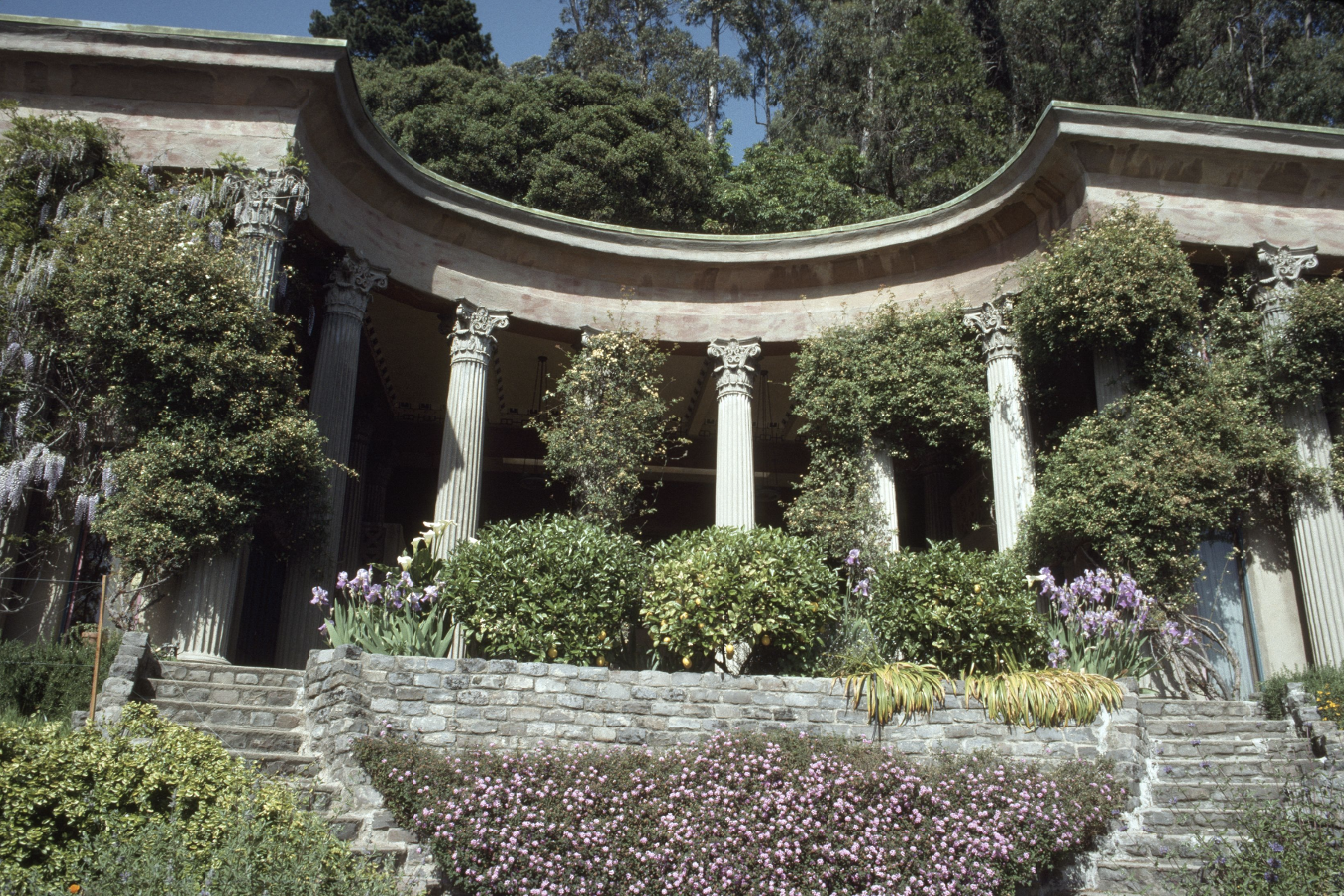
- Temple of Wings in 1993

- Location within Oakland, California Location within California
- 37.880809°N 122.256110°W
- Location: 2800 Buena Vista Way, Berkeley, California, U.S.

History
- Built: 1914

Site notes
- Architect(s): Bernard Maybeck, A. Randolph Monro
- Restored: 1924
- Restored by: Clarence Dakin, Edna Deakin

Berkeley Landmark
- Designated: January 6, 1992
- Reference no.: 173

Temple of Wings is a historic Greco-Roman style private estate located at 2800 Buena Vista Way in the La Loma Park neighborhood of Berkeley, California. The main structure was designed by Bernard Maybeck and completed by A. Randolph Monro. It was originally designed as an open-air private home dedicated to modern and contemporary dance. It has been listed by the city as a Berkeley Landmark (no. 173) since January 6, 1992, and is listed in the California State Historic Resources Inventory. It is sometimes referred to as the Temple of Winds, the Boynton House, and the Charles C. Boynton House.

== History ==
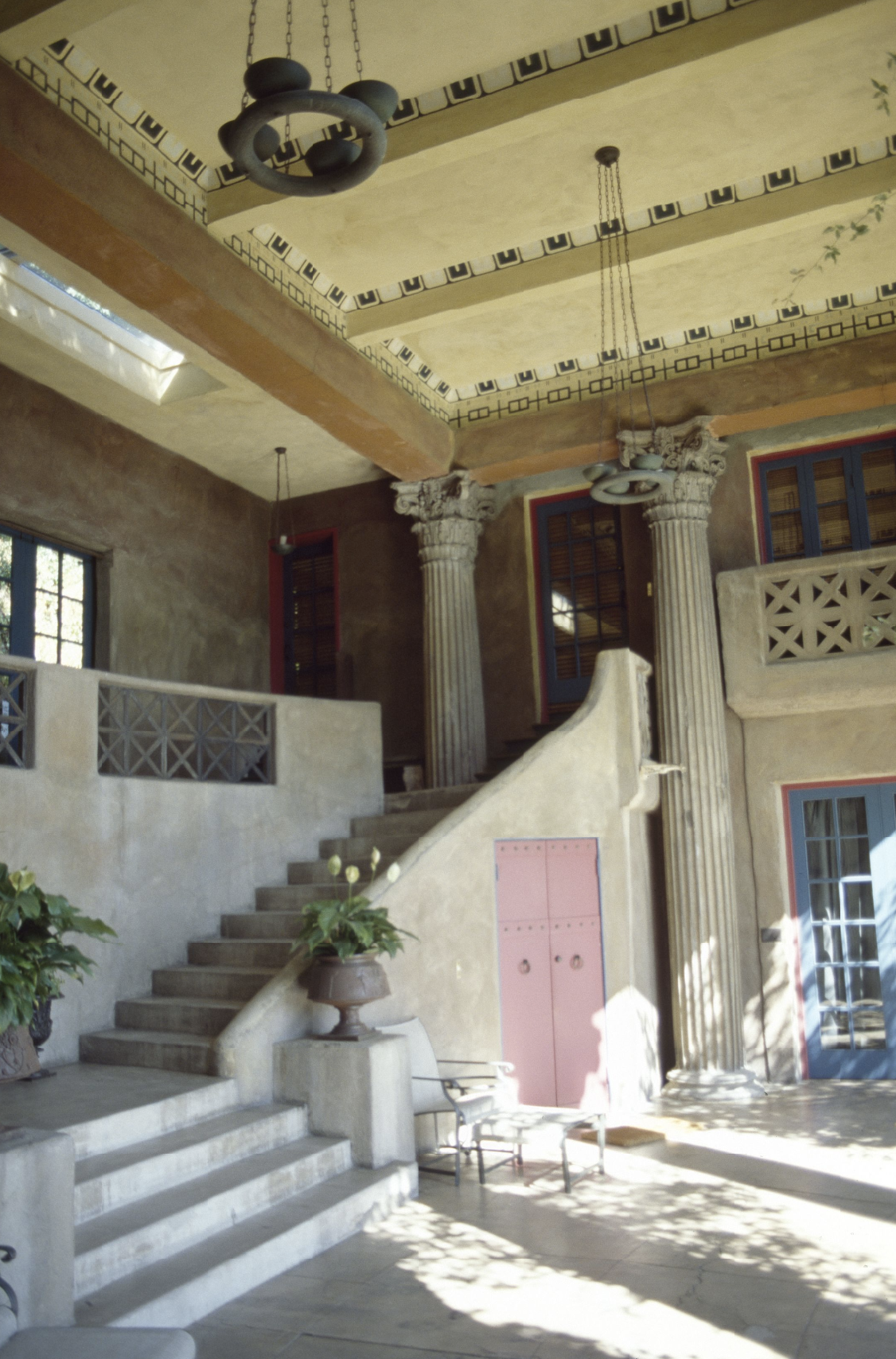
Temple of Wings (1993), area leading to courtyard

Temple of Wings was originally the home of attorney Charles Calvin Boynton, his wife Florence Treadwell Boynton, and their eight children. Florence Treadwell Boynton was "California's chief exponent of rhythmic gymnastics," and promoted "open air motherhood," a parenting philosophy that maximized children's outdoor time. She was a childhood friend and admirer of Isadora Duncan. Boynton created a home and a dance school that reflected Duncan’s philosophies. The estate was passed down for at least four generations of the Boynton family (later known as the Quitzow and Braun family).

It was originally designed and constructed as a Greco-Roman colonnaded open-air private residence for the Boyntons by architect Bernard Maybeck in 1911. The project was completed in 1914 by Arthur Randolph Monro, and it featured hung canvas in lieu of walls.

Clarence Dakin and Edna Deakin remodeled the building in 1924, after the building had caught fire the year prior. During the remodel, they added an enclosed house inside of the colonnade with two levels, and the first level had multiple rooms dedicated as dance studios.

Billionaire heir and philanthropist Gordon Getty and his wife Ann Getty acquired the Temple of Wings property in 1994 and furnished it with antique British and American Arts and Crafts movement furniture and Pre-Raphaelite paintings. They sold it in 2024.

== Legacy ==
From 1914 until 1985, an annual summer dance event was held at the estate called The Festival.

In 1973, the Regional Oral History Office at U.C. Berkeley interviewed Sulgwynn Boynton Quitzow (the daughter of Charles and Florence) and her husband Charles Quitzow about the estate. The Temple of Wings estate was also featured in the photography portfolio Dance for Life (1985) by Margaretta Mitchell.

In 2023, the Getty family announced an auction of all of the estate furnishings and art; this was following the death of Ann Getty in 2020 and the first series of 10 auctions in 2022 from their Pacific Heights estate. In 2024, the home sold for $5.85 million dollars.

== See also ==
- List of Berkeley Landmarks in Berkeley, California
