= Andrew Cowper Lawson House =

Historic house in Berkeley, California, US

- Location within Oakland, California Location within California
- 37.881239°N 122.258103°W
- Location: 1515 La Loma Avenue, Berkeley, California, U.S.

History
- Built: 1907–1908

Site notes
- Architect: Bernard Maybeck

Berkeley Landmark
- Designated: August 16, 1976
- Reference no.: 15

The Andrew Cowper Lawson House, built in 1908, is a historic private residence at 1515 La Loma Avenue in the La Loma Park neighborhood in Berkeley, California, U.S. It has been listed as a Berkeley Landmark (no. 15) by the city since August 16, 1976.

It was designed by Bernard Maybeck for British geologist Andrew Cowper Lawson. It is located directly on the Hayward fault, and was designed to withstand earthquakes (with the knowledge of the time). The house resembled a "Pompeian villa" made of reinforced concrete that was covered in colored stucco that has sgraffito and inlaid tiles.

== See also ==
- List of Berkeley Landmarks in Berkeley, California
