= Fernando Sanford =

American physicist

- Sanford at the Fourth Conference International Union for Cooperation in Solar Research at Mount Wilson Observatory, 1910
- Born: February 12, 1854; Franklin Grove, Illinois
- Died: May 21, 1948 (aged 94); Santa Clara, California
- Citizenship: American
- Education: Carthage College
- Spouse: Alice Evaline Crawford
- Scientific career
- Fields: Physics
- Workplaces: Stanford University

Fernando Sanford (February 12, 1854 – May 21, 1948) was an American physicist and university professor. He was one of the 22 "pioneer professors" (founding faculty) for Stanford University.

Sanford was born on a farm near Franklin Grove in Lee County, Illinois, on February 12, 1854. He was the son of Faxton and Maria Mariah (Bly) Sanford. He attended Carthage College, earning a Bachelor of Science degree in 1879. He taught school until the mid-1880s, then studied physics in Germany under Hermann von Helmholtz for two years.

Returning to the United States, he became a Professor of Physical Science at Lake Forest College. David Starr Jordan, president of Stanford University, chose him as one of the founding professors for Stanford, where he remained until his retirement in 1919. At Stanford he was the founder and first president of the Science Association. He was an early promoter of the use of laboratory instruction for undergraduates. He also helped to formulate the entrance requirements for Stanford.

In 1891-1893 he made photographs of coins with electric discharges, calling the technique "electric photography". This led to later speculations that he may have accidentally made some X-ray photographs.

His book Elements of Physics (published in 1902, digitized in 2007) was an important textbook in the field. Other books and monographs included The Scientific Method And Its Limitations (1899), The Electrical Charges of Atoms and Ions (1919), A Physical Theory of Electrification, and How To Study; Illustrated Through Physics.

His interest in electricity led to his construction of a "terrestrial electric observatory," whose results were published over many years in his Bulletin of the Terrestrial Electric Observatory of Fernando Sanford. His research included an early type of electric photography.

His former residence is now one of the most important structures in the historic district of Professorville in Palo Alto, California.

He died May 21, 1948, in Santa Clara, California.
