= Rose Walk (Berkeley, California) =

Historic site in Berkeley, California, U.S.

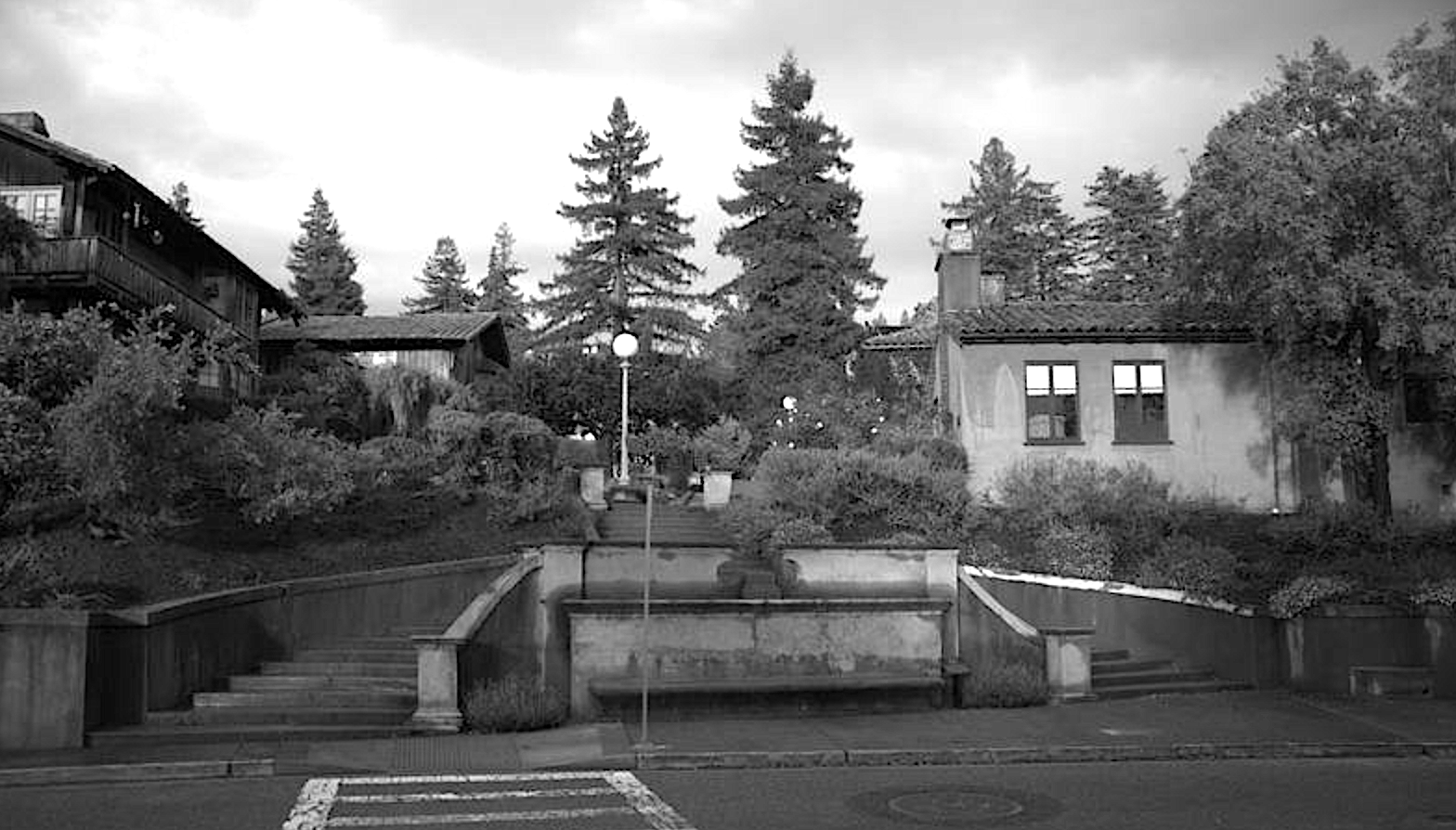

- Location within Oakland, California Location within California
- 37.883115°N 122.261546°W
- Location: 2500 block of Rose Walk, between Euclid and Le Roy Avenues, Berkeley, California, U.S.

Site notes
- Architect: Bernard Maybeck

Berkeley Landmark
- Designated: December 15, 1975
- Reference no.: 9

The Rose Walk, formerly known as Rose Street, is a historic pathway with landscaping designed by architect Bernard Maybeck in the La Loma Park neighborhood of Berkeley, California, U.S. It is located in the 2500 block of Rose Walk, between Euclid Avenue and Le Roy Avenue. It is listed by the city as a Berkeley Landmark, since December 15, 1975. The Rose Walk has a historical marker erected in 1998 by Berkeley Historical Plaque Project.

== History ==
In 1908, the Hillside Club and the City of Berkeley leased the land from the People’s Water Company (owners of the nearby Berryman Reserve). Around 1910, the first plans for a path were designed by city engineer J.J. Jessup, but these were rejected by the Hillside Club. The Hillside Club formed a committee and fundraised local residents for the path project, and they convinced Bernard Maybeck donated his design services. The Rose Walk was completed in July 1913, and is set on a steep hillside. The path was designed to connect its residents to the Key System of streetcars and trains, specifically the Euclid Avenue streetcar line.

The 1923 Berkeley fire wiped away the entire built environment in the neighboring Wheeler Tract, which influenced the design of the later built houses. The houses surrounding the path are designed by many notable early 19th-century architects including Maybeck, John Galen Howard, Julia Morgan, and after 1924 by Henry Higby Gutterson. It is a popular tourist location and has been pictured on many post cards.

The Rose Walk is near the Berkeley Rose Garden, a city-owned park and terraced amphitheater featuring hundreds of rose bush plants.

== See also ==
- List of Berkeley Landmarks in Berkeley, California
