= Professorville =

Historic district in Palo Alto, California, United States

- Professorville Historic District
- U.S. National Register of Historic Places
- U.S. Historic district
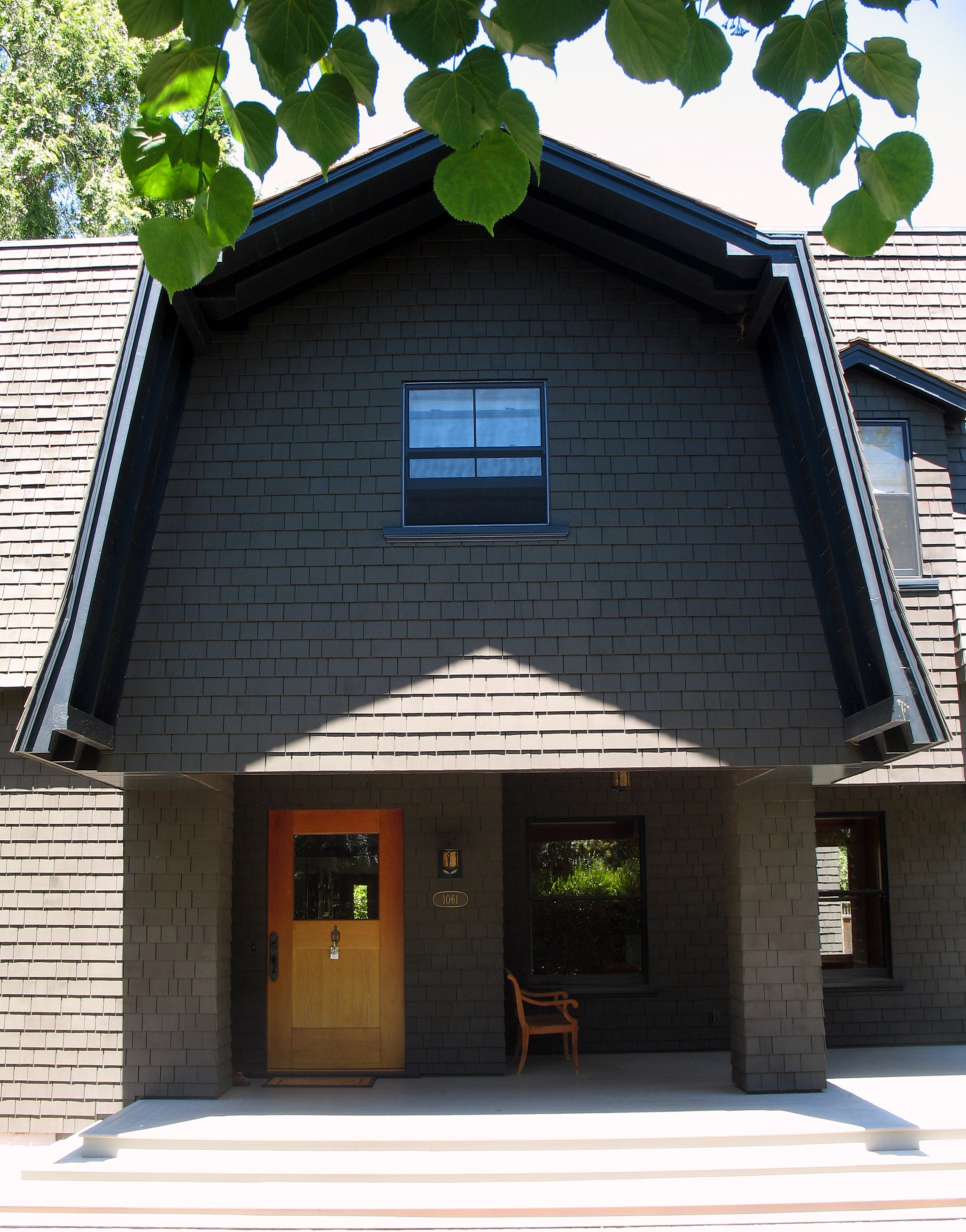
- Sun-bonnet House at 1061 Bryant St.

- Location within San Francisco Bay Area Location within California Location within the United States
- Location: Roughly bounded by Embarcadero Rd., Addison Ave., Emerson and Cowper Sts. Palo Alto, California
- Coordinates: 37°26′30″N 122°09′15″W
- Area: 34.4 acres (13.9 ha)
- Built: 1895
- Architect: Bernard Maybeck
- Architectural style: Colonial Revival, Craftsman bungalow
- NRHP reference No.: 80000861
- Added to NRHP: October 3, 1980

Professorville is a registered historic district in Palo Alto, California containing homes that were built by Stanford University professors. The historic district is bounded by Addison Avenue, Waverley Street, Kingsley Avenue, and Ramona Street. The community considers the district to be larger and bounded by Addison Avenue on the northwest, Cowper Street on the northeast, Embarcadero Road on the southeast, and Emerson Street on the southwest.

== Origins ==
The Professorville Historic District reflects the area's origins and its early years related to the founding of both Stanford University and Palo Alto itself. Stanford University allowed professors to build houses on Stanford land, but would only lease the land. Professorville was the closest place to the campus and downtown Palo Alto that was not owned by Stanford. Professors who preferred to own their own land rather than lease it from the Stanfords built their homes there. Lot sizes in Professorville vary greatly in size and location, including flag lots. The developer of the tract was eager to sell the land and so he sold various lot sizes including full blocks and half blocks. The owners of the large lots then sold off portions of their property, starting at the outer edges, until the original buildings themselves were on a modest-sized remaining lot. In February 2023, the median list price for houses in Professorville was $4.34 million.

== Architecture ==
The buildings most representative of Professorville are brown-shingled houses with gambrel roofs, whose stylistic influences range from Colonial Revival to American Craftsman. Dutch Colonials are the predominant architecture on three blocks of Kingsley Avenue.

One of the largest residences, a 3-story, 14-room frame house at 450 Kingsley Avenue, is the former home of Stanford's first physics professor, Fernando Sanford, designed by architect Frank McMurray of Chicago. The house includes features fashionable at the time, such as a Queen Anne corner tower and a Palladian window in front.

Other former professors' houses include 1005 Bryant Street, built for professor Frank Angell, who founded the university's Psychology Department, and 433 Melville Avenue, built for professor Charles Henry Gilbert, founding chair of the Zoology Department, and designed by Arthur Bridgman Clark, an architect and art professor. The "Dead Houses" (named after the Grateful Dead) is a cooperative housing community centered in Professorville, primarily inhabited by Stanford students and recent graduates, with notable past tenants including entrepreneur and philanthropist Sean Parker.

== See also ==
- Ramona Street Architectural District
