= First Church of Christ, Scientist (Berkeley, California) =

Historic church in California, United States

- U.S. National Register of Historic Places
- U.S. National Historic Landmark
- Berkeley Landmark
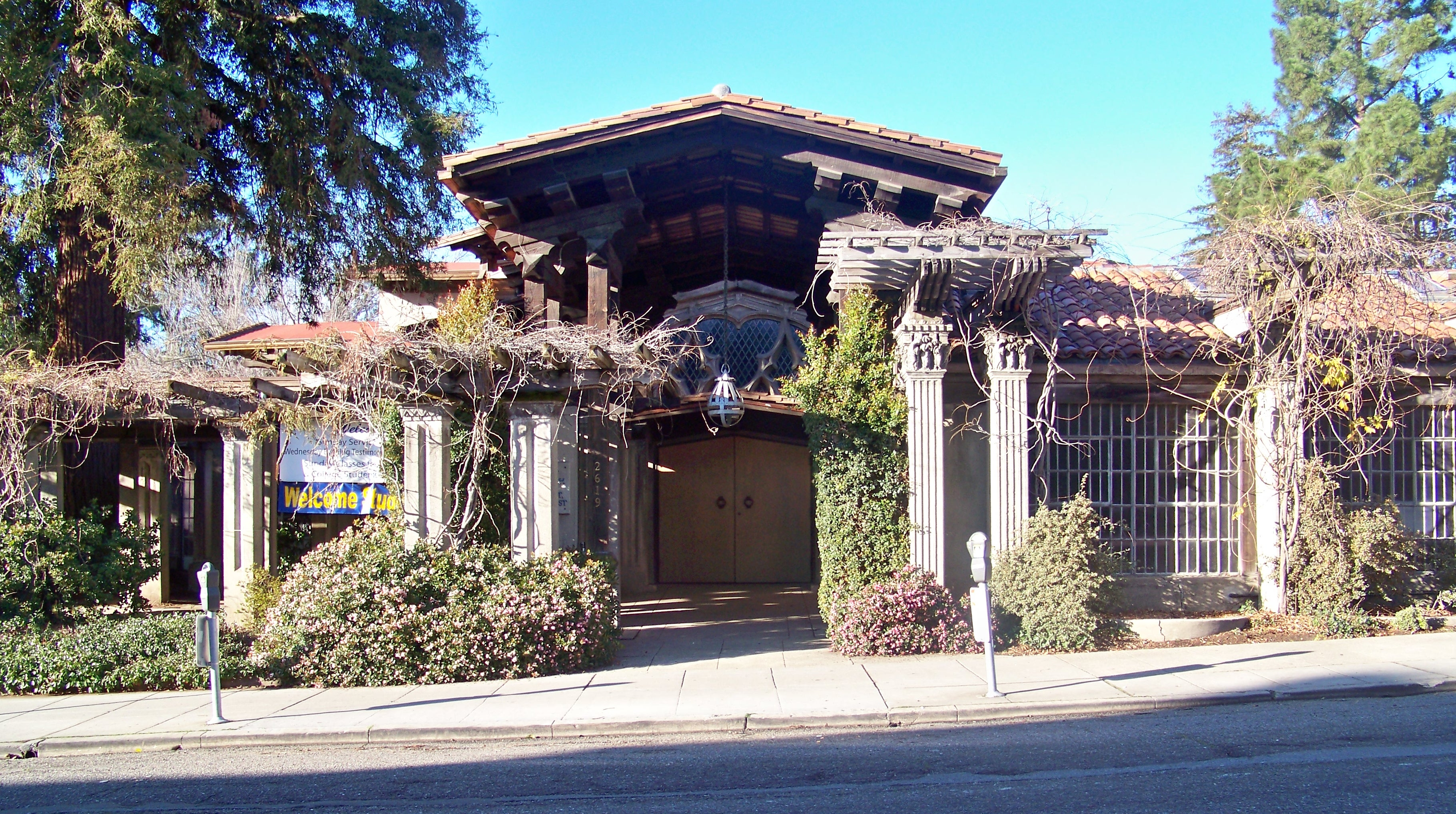

- Location within Oakland, California Location within California Location within the United States
- Location: 2619 Dwight Way, Berkeley, California
- Coordinates: 37°51′56.75″N 122°15′21.75″W
- Built: 1910
- Architect: Bernard Ralph Maybeck
- Architectural style: Mixed (more Than 2 Styles From Different Periods)
- NRHP reference No.: 77000283
- BERKL No.: 5

Significant dates
- Added to NRHP: December 22, 1977
- Designated NHL: December 22, 1977
- Designated BERKL: December 15, 1975

First Church of Christ, Scientist, Berkeley, now also known as Christian Science Society, Berkeley, is a Christian Science church, located at 2619 Dwight Way at Bowditch Street across the street from People's Park, in Berkeley, in Alameda County, California.

The Christian Science Society, Berkeley continues to meet in their over-100-year-old church building.

== History ==
The First Church of Christ, Scientist, Berkeley held its first service in Wilkin's Hall, 2412 Haste Street, on Sunday, March 12, 1905, and its present membership— October, 1905—is forty-eight. A lot was bought (2892 Dwight Way) in June, and a church building will be erected later on.

— The Christian Science Journal (December 1905)

The historic 1910 church was designed by renowned architect Bernard Ralph Maybeck (1862–1957), in a primarily American Craftsman style, with Byzantine Revival, Romanesque Revival, and Gothic Revival style elements. The church is widely considered one of Maybeck's masterpieces.

The basic plan is that of a square or Greek cross, with two pair of great crossed trusses spanning the central space overhead. In 1929 a Sunday School addition was added to the Church.

=== Landmark ===
It was declared a National Historic Landmark in 1977, and is on the National Register of Historic Places in Alameda County, California.

In October 2005, the Friends of First Church Berkeley were awarded a prestigious federal Save America's Treasurers (SAT) Grant, for the roof replacement and seismic strengthening of the 1910 church and much of the 1929 Sunday school addition. The church received a Getty Architectural Conservation Implementation Grant in 2006, to enable the completion of the seismic strengthening of the church and Sunday school addition. In 2009 and 2010, the Friends of First Church Berkeley received University of California Berkeley Chancellor's Community Partnership Grants for restoring the garden setting of the church.

== See also ==
- Bernard Maybeck buildings
- List of Berkeley Landmarks in Berkeley, California
- National Register of Historic Places listings in Alameda County, California
