= Swedenborgian Church (San Francisco) =

Historic church in California, United States

- U.S. National Register of Historic Places
- U.S. National Historic Landmark
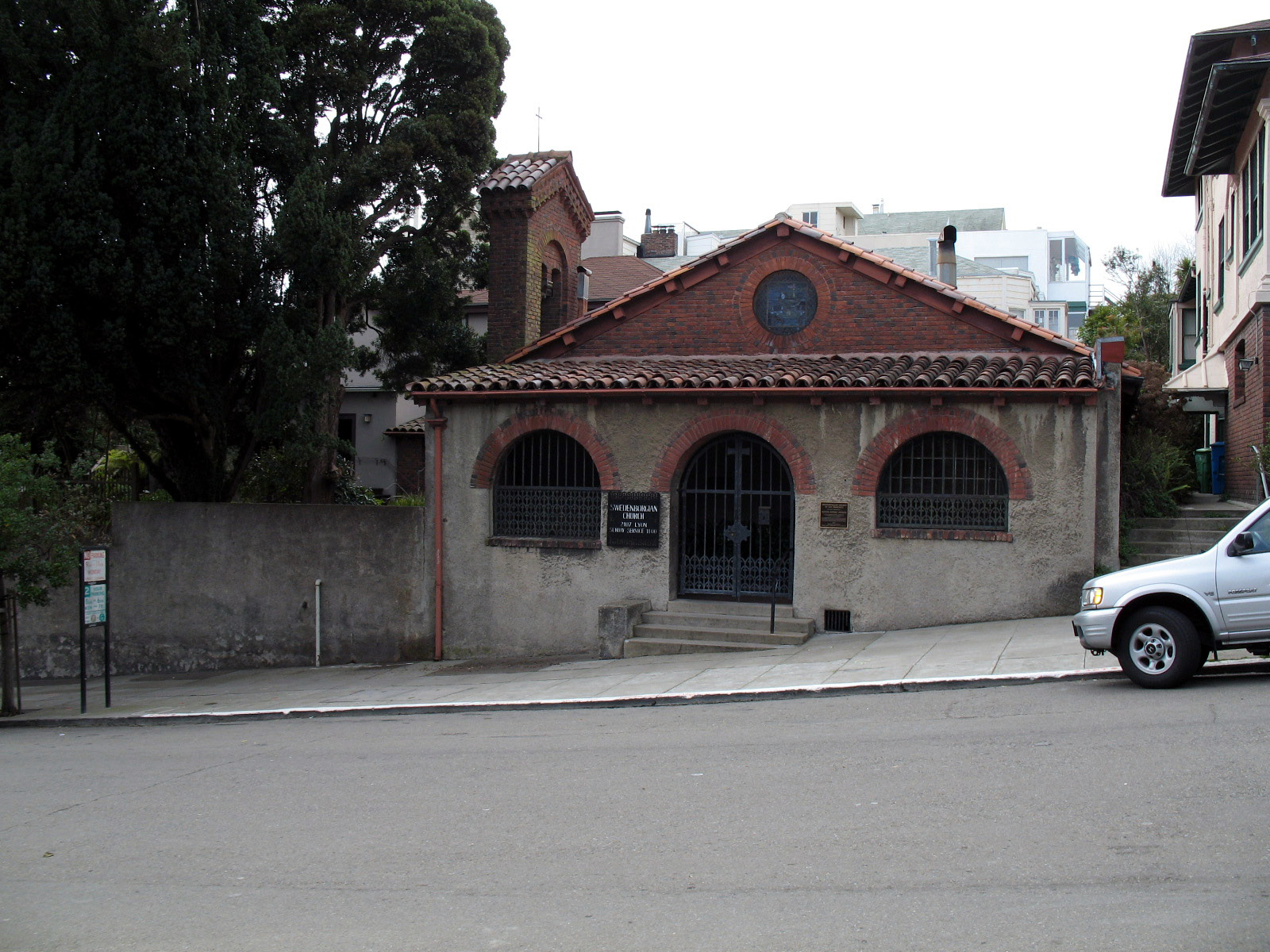

- Location within San Francisco County Location within California Location within the United States
- Location: 2107 Lyon Street, San Francisco, California
- Coordinates: 37°47′25″N 122°26′45.2″W
- Built: March 17, 1895
- Architects: A. Page Brown, A. C. Schweinfurth, Bernard Maybeck
- Architectural style: Bungalow/Arts and Crafts
- NRHP reference No.: 04001154

Significant dates
- Added to NRHP: August 18, 2004
- Designated NHL: August 18, 2004

The Swedenborgian Church is a historic church complex at 2107 Lyon Street in the Pacific Heights neighborhood of San Francisco, California. Built in 1895 for a Swedenborgian congregation, it is considered one of California's earliest pure Arts and Crafts buildings, with design contributions by A. C. Schweinfurth, A. Page Brown, Bernard Maybeck, William Keith, and Bruce Porter. It was designated a National Historic Landmark in 2004.

== Architecture and building history ==
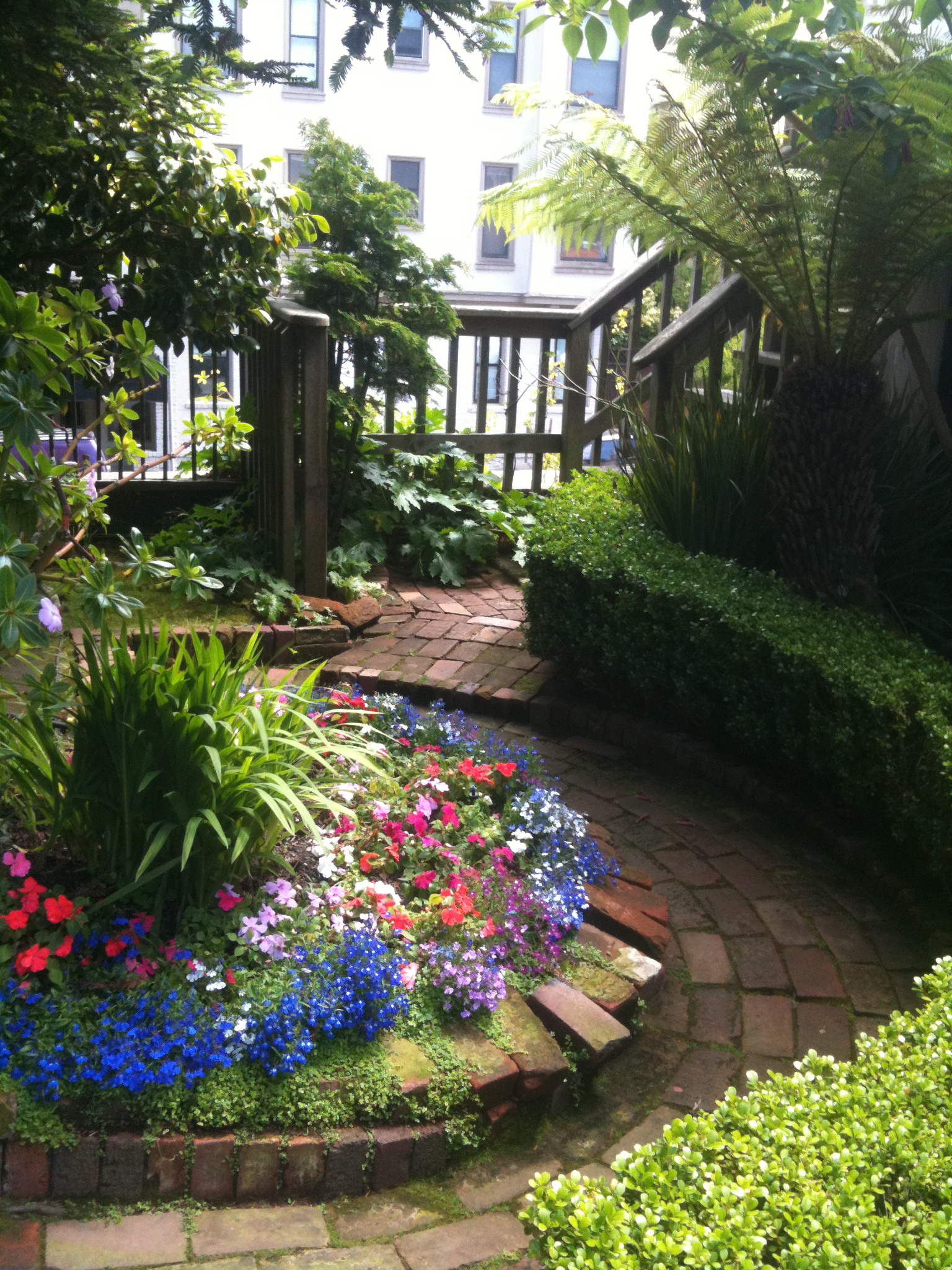
The landscaped gardens

The Swedenborgian Church is located at the northwest corner of Lyon and Washington Streets in San Francisco's Pacific Heights neighborhood, on a lot that has been leveled by fill held by a stuccoed retaining wall. The complex is basically rectangular, housing the church, parsonage, and parish house amid landscaped gardens. It is accessed by an arched portico, flanked by similar arched openings, which form a sort of portico in front of the sanctuary facing Lyon Street, covered by a tile roof. The sanctuary is a single-story structure, with a thick walls finished with a variety of colored and textured bricks. The gabled roof is supported by heavy timbers, which are exposed on the inside. The doors into the sanctuary are made of dark tongue-and-groove oak boards, and are fastened by hand-wrought iron hinges. The interior of the main sanctuary is dominated by massive timbers, mainly madrone clad in Douglas fir wainscoting.

The first pastor of the church was Rev. Joseph Worcester (May 20, 1836 - August 4, 1913), who bought the land and worked with the architects to design the church. Contributions were made to the plans by A. C. Schweinfurth, A. Page Brown, Bernard Maybeck, William Keith, and Bruce Porter. The then-nascent Arts and Crafts movement was viewed by Worcester as harmonizing particularly well with Swedenborgian teachings about harmonizing man with nature. The church opened for worship March 17, 1895. It remains essentially the same as when it was built.

== See also ==
- National Register of Historic Places listings in San Francisco
- List of National Historic Landmarks in California
