= Felton Institute =

Coordinates: 37.7827°N 122.42397°W

FSASF

The Felton Institute, formerly known as the Family Service Agency of San Francisco (FSA), was founded in 1889 as Associated Charities. FSASF is the oldest nonsectarian, nonprofit charitable social-services provider in the City and County of San Francisco. It relies on contributions from government, private donors, and private clients.

FSA focuses on strengthening families by providing caring, effective, and innovative social services, with special emphasis on the needs of low-income families, children, and the elderly, and disabled people, thus improving the quality of life for all San Franciscans.

== History ==
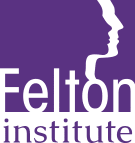
Logo of Felton Institute

The organization began in 1889, as Associated Charities of San Francisco. In 1928, they moved into a new building designed by Bernard Maybeck at 1010 Gough Street. Not wanting to be considered a charity, they changed their name to Family Service Agency in 1938. In 2006, the name was changed to Felton Institute, honoring the contributions of Katharine Felton. As of 2020 the Felton Institute is located at 1500 Franklin Street.
