= Eugen Neuhaus =

German-born American painter and professor

- Born: August 18, 1879; Barmen, Germany
- Died: October 28, 1963 (aged 84); Berkeley, California, U.S.
- Occupations: Painter, professor
- Spouse: Leona May
- Children: 1 son

Eugen Neuhaus (August 18, 1879 - October 28, 1963) was a German-born American oil painter, university professor, and the author of four books. He was educated in Kassel and Berlin, emigrated to the United States in 1904, and became a naturalized U.S. citizen in 1911. He taught at the University of California, Berkeley from 1907 to 1949, including as a full professor from 1927 to 1949, and at the Dominican University of California from 1928 to 1932.
