= La Loma Park =

Neighborhood of Berkeley, California, United States of America

- La Loma Park Historic District
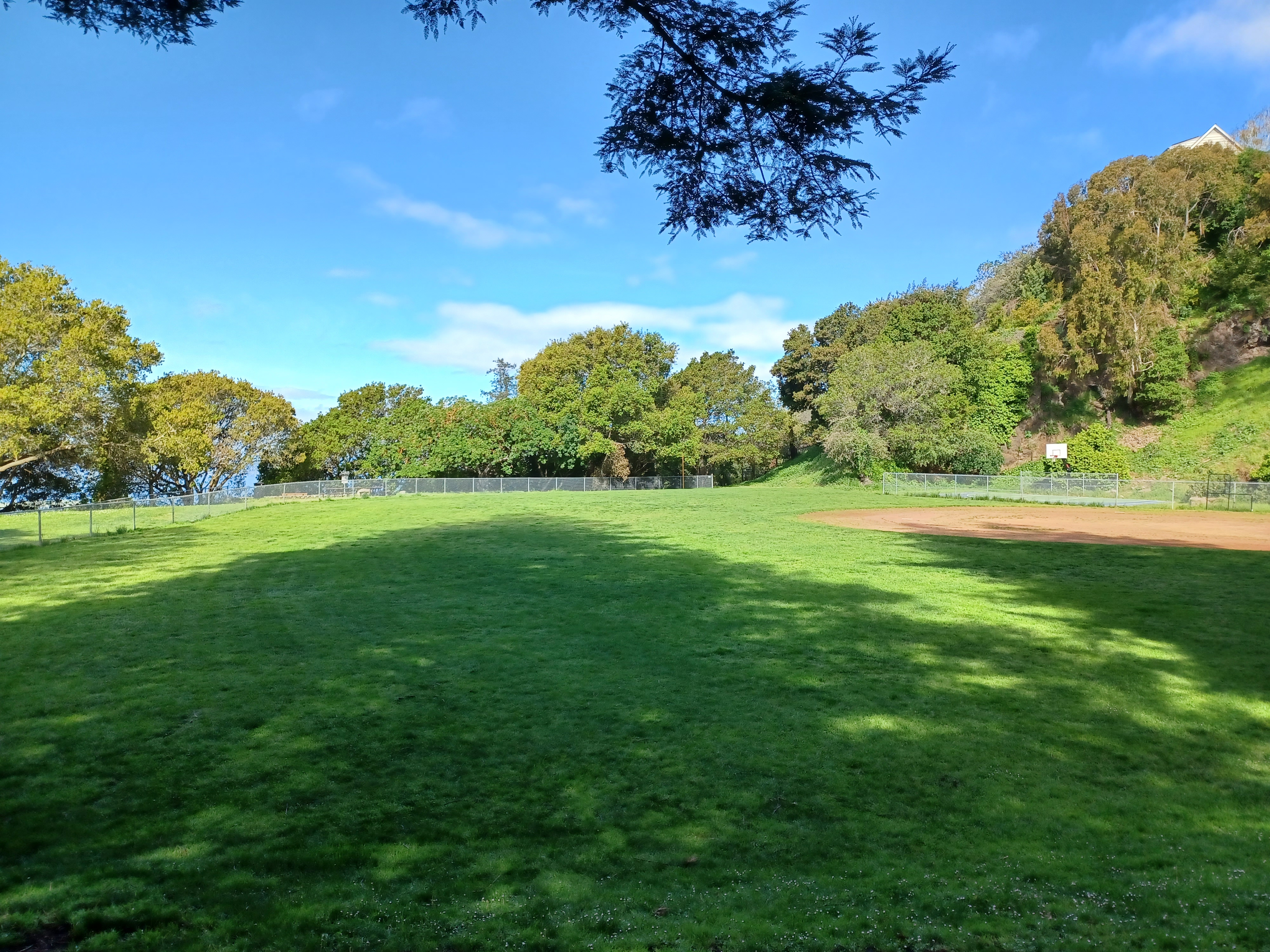
- Glendale-La Loma Park in 2023
- Interactive map of La Loma Park
- Coordinates: 37°52′56″N 122°15′31″W
- Address: Berkeley, California, U.S.

La Loma Park is a neighborhood and tract of land located in the Berkeley Hills section of the city of Berkeley, California in the San Francisco Bay Area. The land had been the property of Captain Richard Parks Thomas, a veteran of the American Civil War and Berkeley businessman. Today, it is entirely a residential area The Spanish word loma means "rise/low hill". Although hilly throughout, its average elevation is about 614 feet (187 m).

The La Loma Park Historic District is designated by the city as a Berkeley Landmark since May 6, 2002. The area contains the La Loma Steps, another Berkeley Landmark that also has a historical plaque.

== History ==
Captain Richard Park Thomas' home was located on the site of what is today Greenwood Terrace. Some of the large trees here were originally planted by Captain Thomas and managed to survive the devastating fire of 1923 which swept through this part of Berkeley. Thomas enclosed his vast property with a low, whitewashed fence on its north, west and south sides, leaving the east side — the upper hillside — open.

Captain Thomas was the owner of the Standard Soap Company in West Berkeley, president of the California National Bank of San Francisco, and owner of the Berkeley Ferryboat Line. He had a reputation as a friend of the working man and an eccentric character, and was probably the first person who inspired the nickname for the district: "Nut Hill". An old map includes a notation that he kept an illegal still on his property. He devised a scheme for an aerial tramway running from the Berkeley flatlands to the hills. Every Fourth of July, he fired off an old civil war cannon from "Fort La Loma", a plaza he constructed up the hill from his home. The site is today occupied by "Hume Cloister," also known as "Hume Castle" on Buena Vista Way, named for Samuel James Hume and his wife, who had architect John Hudson Thomas design a reduced-scale replica of a cloister in Toulouse, France.

In the 19th century, a stone quarry was opened at the head of Codornices Creek, abutting the north boundary of the La Loma Park tract. Some of the rock quarried here had a pinkish hue and was used to tint the concrete sidewalks and pathways throughout parts of North Berkeley, a practice that has been maintained by the city to this day, albeit using tint from other sources. The quarry was closed by the 1940s. In the late 1960s the quarry was made into a public park, "Glendale-La Loma Park".

A number of notable people have lived in the La Loma Park/Nut Hill area over the years, including many professors from the University of California, Berkeley, among them, J. Robert Oppenheimer and his nemesis-colleague, Edward Teller. Famed San Francisco Bay Area architect Bernard Maybeck made his home here, as well as the homes of several others in the neighborhood, a fact memorialized by Maybeck Twin Drive off of Buena Vista above La Loma. Further up Buena Vista Way is an estate known as the Temple of Wings with its Corinthian-style columns, an early 20th-century bohemian hangout.

A former public school, Hillside Elementary School is located in the La Loma district on the block bounded by Le Roy Avenue, Buena Vista Way and La Loma Avenue. It is registered as a local historic landmark. The present structure was built after the 1923 fire destroyed its predecessor, located on the southwest corner of Le Roy and Virginia Street. Hillside was closed as a public school both because of a declining school-age population and because it sits immediately adjacent to the Hayward Fault, which runs directly behind it on La Loma Avenue.

Upon being subdivided and developed, some residents of the district formed the La Loma Improvement Club. One of their efforts included subsidizing the northward extension of the Euclid Avenue streetcar line from Hilgard to the Berryman Reservoir, which today is adjacent to Codornices Park and the Berkeley Rose Garden. The Euclid line was first constructed in 1903 as an extension of the Telegraph Avenue streetcar line, and originally terminated at Hilgard and Arch streets. The extension to the Berryman Reservoir (Rose Street, now Rose Walk) was completed in August 1910. A subsequent further extension was made in 1912, across Codornices Canyon, by means of a trestle for both streetcar and autos. The line was built to Regal Road and remained active until the end of all streetcar service in 1948.

== Notable buildings ==
- Andrew Cowper Lawson House (1908), 1515 La Loma Avenue; Berkeley Landmark
- Temple of Wings (1914), 2800 Buena Vista Way; Berkeley Landmark
- Hillside Elementary School (1925), 1581 Le Roy Ave; NRHP-listed
