= Florence Treadwell Boynton =

American educator (1876–1962)

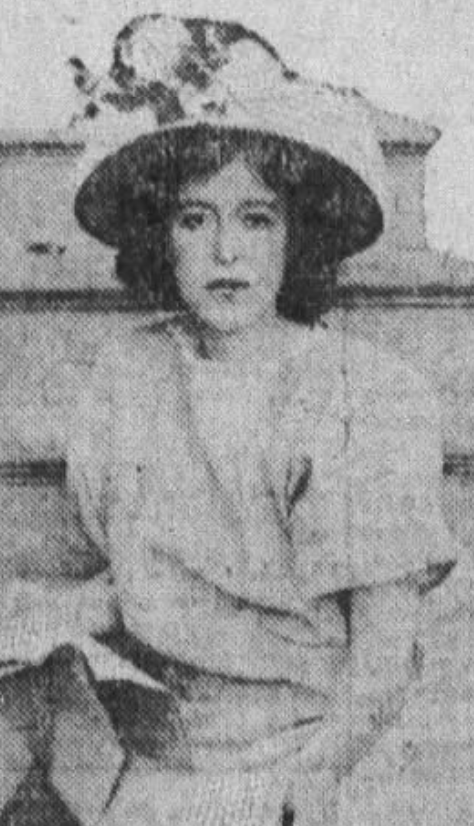
- Florence Treadwell Boynton, from a 1911 newspaper
- Born: Florence Elizabeth Treadwell; December 25, 1876; San Francisco, California, U.S.
- Died: March 23, 1962 (age 85); Berkeley, California, U.S.
- Occupation: Educator
- Spouse: Charles Calvin Boynton
- Children: 8

Florence Elizabeth Treadwell Boynton (December 25, 1876 – March 23, 1962) was an American educator, artist, designer, and social reformer. She was "California's chief exponent of rhythmic gymnastics," and promoted "Open Air Motherhood", a parenting philosophy that maximized children's outdoor time.

== Early life ==
Florence "Mina" Treadwell was born in San Francisco in 1876, the daughter of miner and inventor John Bartlett Treadwell and Mary "May" Sulgwynn Wentworth Treadwell; the family understood May Wentworth to be the daughter of inventor Isaac Singer. Florence Treadwell was raised in Oakland, where she and Isadora Duncan were close friends from girlhood.

== Career ==
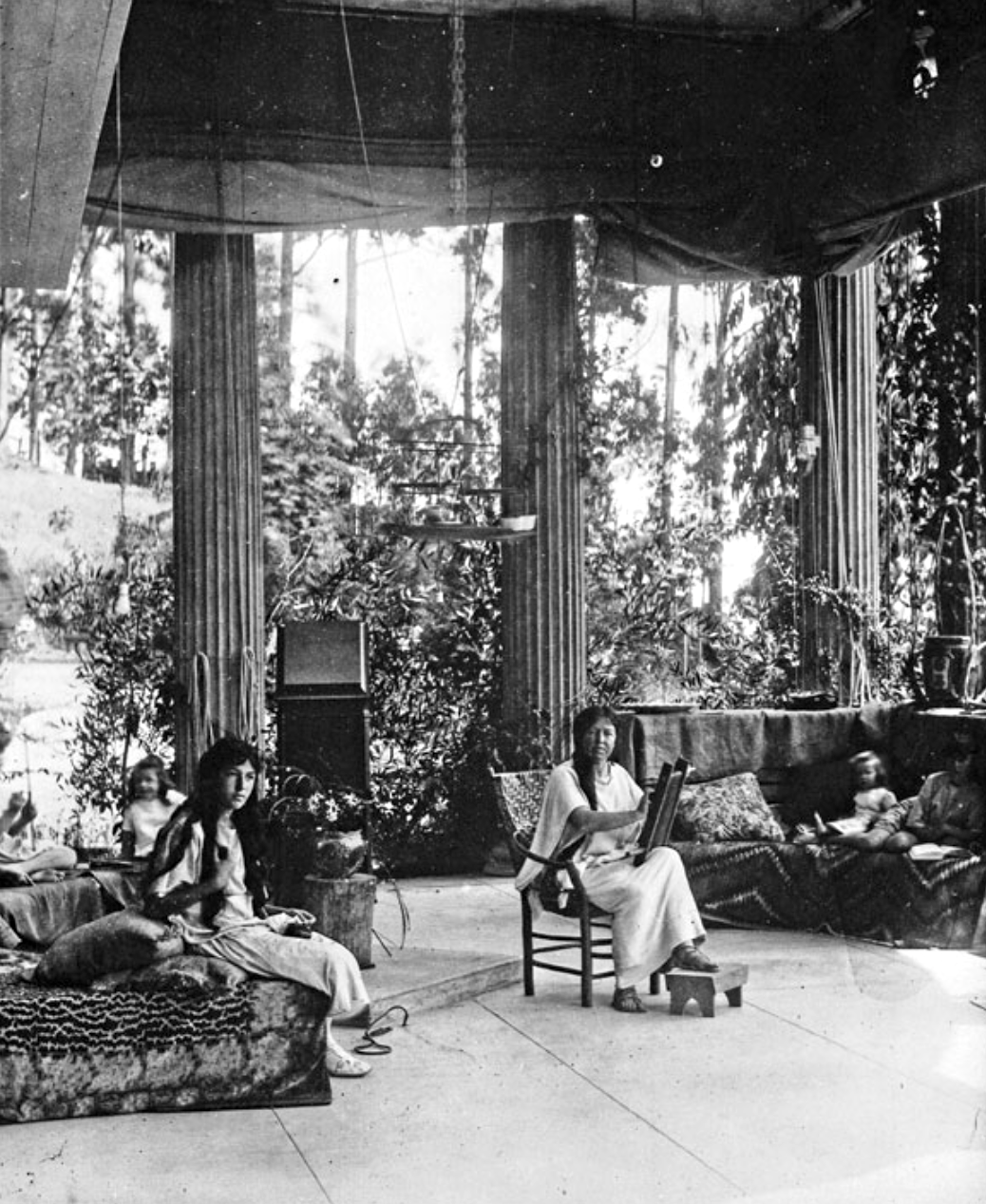
Temple of Wings, interior (c. 1915)

Treadwell taught music and dance, and opened an open-air dance studio in her Berkeley home, called the Temple of Wings (sometimes misnamed "Temple of Winds"), inspired by Isadora Duncan's work. She started four seasonal dance festivals. She promoted "Open Air Motherhood," a parenting philosophy that maximized children's outdoor time, beginning with outdoor birth, with attendant reforms in clothing, footwear, diet, and education. "It is not necessary that all women of a country be mothers," she said in 1911. "But it is necessary that all the children of a country be mothered and cared for in the best possible way."

== Personal life ==
Florence Treadwell was engaged to Augustin Duncan and William Randolph Hearst before she married attorney Charles Calvin Boynton. They had eight children together. Her husband died in 1960, and she died in Berkeley, in 1962, at the age of 85. Her home and studio, the Temple of Wings, is listed in the California State Historic Resources Inventory, and in 1991 was designated City of Berkeley Landmark.
