= Bernard Maybeck =

American architect (1862–1957)

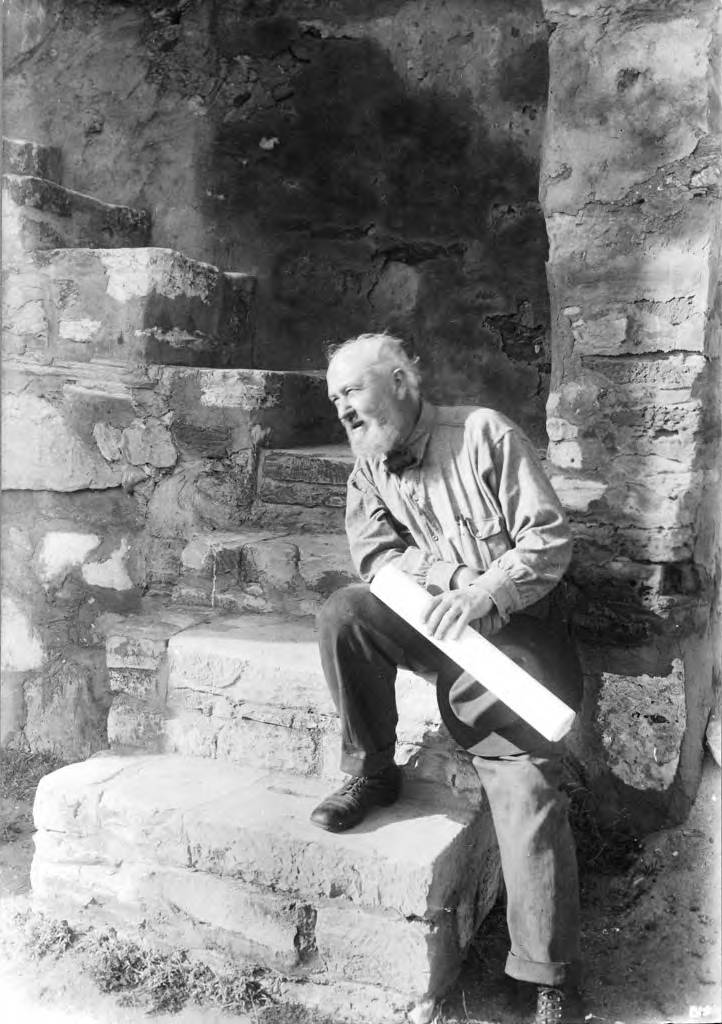
- Maybeck in 1919
- Born: Bernard Ralph Maybeck; February 7, 1862; New York City, New York, U.S.
- Died: October 3, 1957 (aged 95); Berkeley, California, U.S.
- Education: École nationale supérieure des Beaux-Arts
- Occupation: Architect
- Awards: AIA Gold Medal (1951)

Bernard Ralph Maybeck (February 7, 1862 – October 3, 1957) was an American architect. He worked primarily in the San Francisco Bay Area, designing public buildings, including the Palace of Fine Arts in San Francisco, and also private houses, especially in Berkeley, where he lived and taught at the University of California. A number of his works are listed on the National Register of Historic Places.

== Early life and education ==
Maybeck was born in New York City, the son of a German immigrant, and studied at the Ecole des Beaux Arts in Paris, France. (Note: One of his early jobs was with the architectural firm of Carrere and Hastings, working as a draftsman on the monumental Ponce de Leon Hotel built for Standard Oil magnate Henry Flagler in St. Augustine, Florida. Maybeck's father also worked on the project as a woodcarver.)

== Career ==
He moved to Berkeley, California, in 1892. He taught engineering drawing and architectural design at the University of California, Berkeley from 1894 to 1903, and acted as a mentor for some other important California architects, including Julia Morgan and William Wurster.

Maybeck was equally comfortable producing works in the American Craftsman, Mission Revival, Gothic revival, Arts and Crafts, and Beaux-Arts styles, believing that each architectural problem required development of an entirely new solution.

While working in the office of A. Page Brown in San Francisco, Maybeck probably contributed to the Mission Style California Building at the 1893 World's Columbian Exposition in Chicago and was one of the designers of the San Francisco Swedenborgian Church, which included the first Mission Style chair.

For the 1915 Panama-Pacific International Exposition, he designed the domed Palace of Fine Arts and also the "House of Hoo Hoo", a "lumberman's lodge" made of rough-barked tree trunks. The Palace of Fine Arts was seen as the embodiment of Maybeck's elaboration of how Roman architecture could fit within a California context. Maybeck said that the popular success of the Palace was due to the absence of a roof connecting the rotunda to the art gallery building, along with the absence of windows in the gallery walls and the presence near the rotunda of trees, flowers and a water feature.

In 1928, he designed the Harrison Memorial Library in Carmel in a Spanish Eclectic style.

In his long-time home city of Berkeley, the 1910 First Church of Christ, Scientist, Berkeley is designated a National Historic Landmark and is considered one of his masterpieces. In 1914, he oversaw the building of the Maybeck Recital Hall in Berkeley.

On flatter sites, such as the city of San Francisco, the campus of the University of California, Berkeley, and the Loch Lin General Plan for Principia College in Illinois, his proposals were guided by more formal Beaux Arts planning principles. One of Maybeck's most interesting office buildings is the home of the Family Service Agency of San Francisco at 1010 Gough Street, from 1928, which is on the city's Historic Building Register. Some of his larger residential projects, particularly those in the Berkeley hills such as La Loma Park, have been compared to the ultimate bungalows of the architects Greene and Greene.

Maybeck had many ideas about town planning that he elaborated throughout his career. As a citizen of Berkeley from the 1890s, he was intimately involved in the Hillside Club. His associations and work there helped evolve ideas about hillside communities. Maybeck developed a number of firm beliefs in how civilization and the land should relate to each other. Two overriding principles guided his approach:

1. The primacy of the landscape - geology, flora, and fauna were not to be subdued by architecture so much as enhanced by architecture
2. Roads should pattern the existing grade and not be an imposition upon it

There were other principles he would elucidate, such as a shared public landscape, but these were key, and helped Berkeley evolve into a paradigm for hillside living that was organic and unique.

Maybeck's visions for communities in the East Bay were also a conscientious counterpoint to across the bay where in San Francisco city planning was much more conventional, forced, and regimented into expansive grids of streets. Its grids, imposed in places on very steep grades, resulted in extremely steep streets, sidewalks, and urban transitions, some of which were almost comically so. He also developed a comprehensive town plan for the company town of Brookings, Oregon, a clubhouse at the Bohemian Grove, and many of the buildings on the campus of Principia College in Elsah, Illinois.

== Personal life ==
A lifelong fascination with drama and the theater is evident in much of Maybeck's work. In his spare time, he was known to create costumes and also design sets for the amateur productions at the Hillside Club.

Bernard Maybeck died on October 3, 1957, aged 95, and is buried in the Mountain View Cemetery in Oakland, California.

== Honors ==
In 1951, he was awarded the Gold Medal of the American Institute of Architects.

== Gallery ==
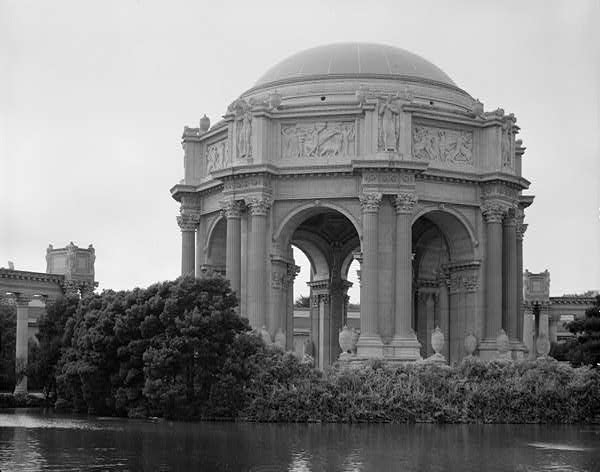
Palace of Fine Arts in San Francisco

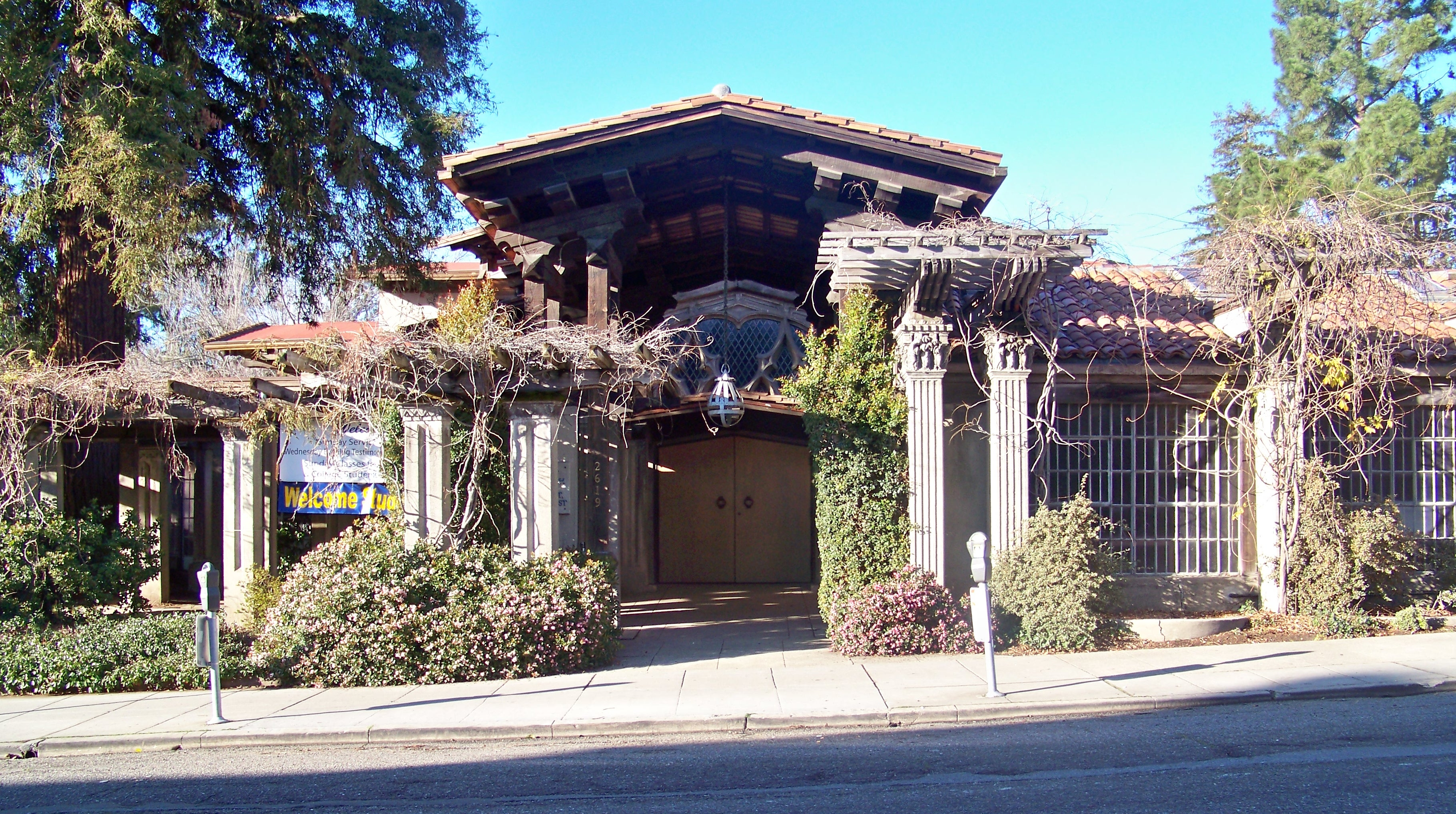
First Church of Christ, Scientist (Berkeley, California)

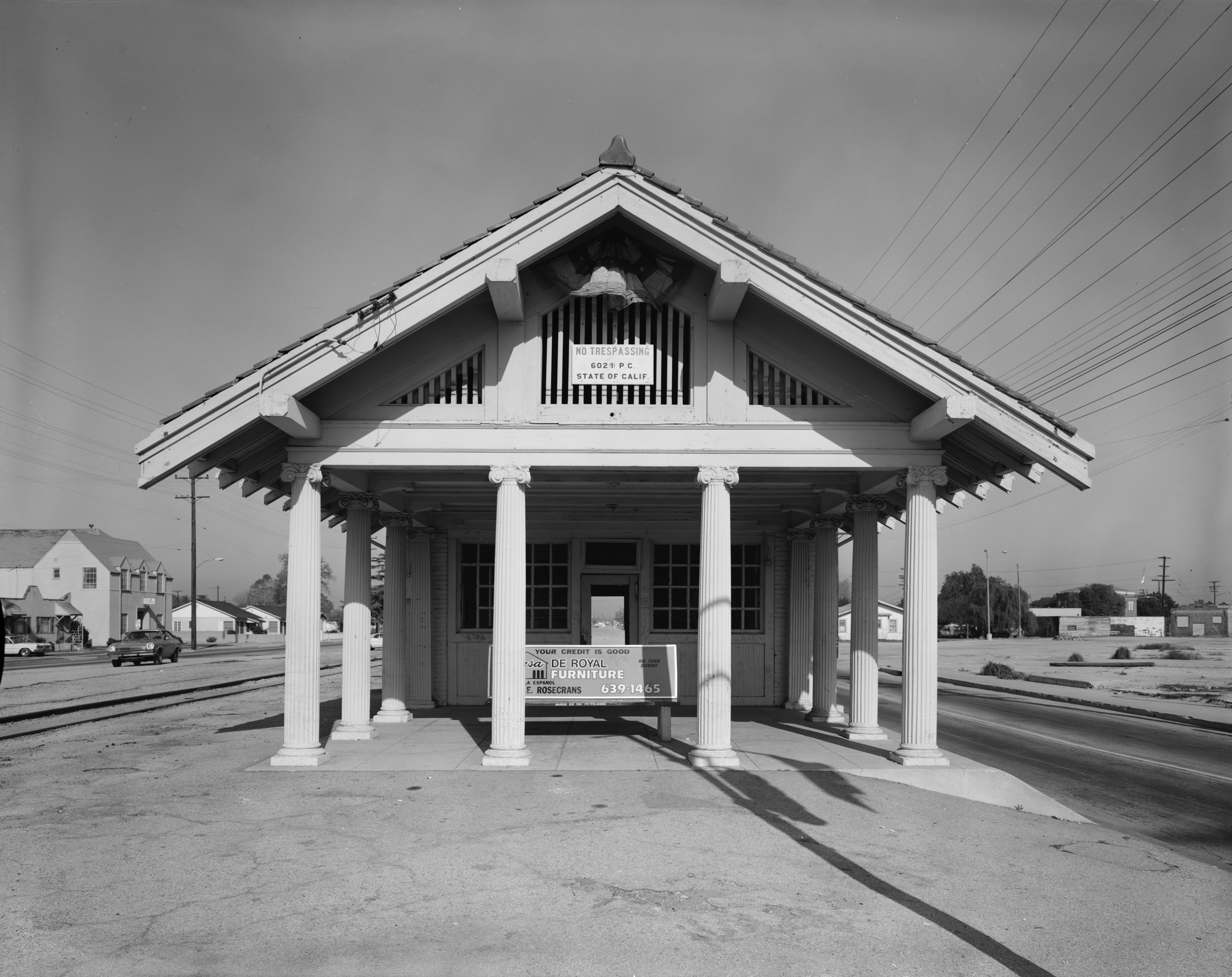
Lynwood Pacific Electric Railway Depot, Los Angeles, California

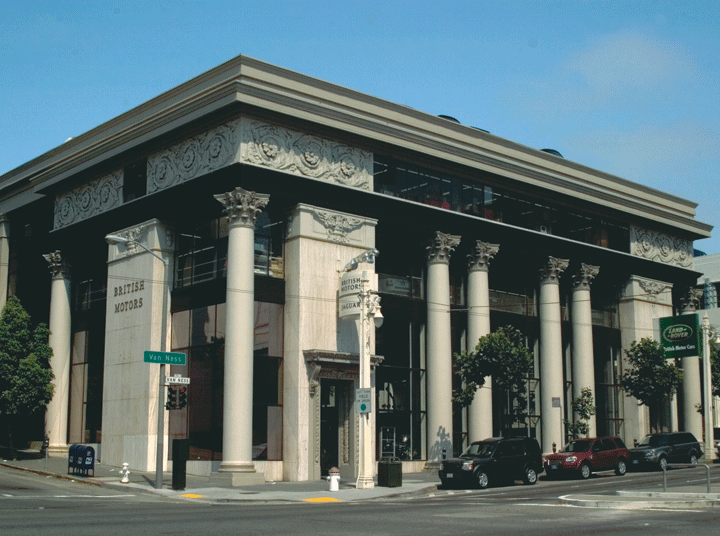
Automobile dealership, San Francisco

== Notable works ==
Date	Work	Location	Notes	Ref.
1895, 1902	Charles Keeler House & Studio	Berkeley Hills, Highland Place, North Berkeley, California	Maybeck's first private client Charles Keeler	
1895	Swedenborgian Church	3200 Washington Street at Lyon Street, Pacific Heights, San Francisco, California, California	NRHP-listed	
1898−1902	Wyntoon	Rural Siskiyou County, California	With architect Julia Morgan; private estate of Phoebe Apperson Hearst−Hearst family	
1902	Boke House	23 Panoramic Way, Panoramic Hill Historic District, Berkeley, California	For George Henry Boke (1869–1929)	
1902	Faculty Club	University of California, Berkeley campus	Later additions by Maybeck and John Galen Howard; NRHP-listed	
1903–04	Grove Clubhouse−Maybeck Lodge	Bohemian Grove, Monte Rio, California	Bohemian Club 'campground' on the Russian River	
1904	Howard B. Gates House	62 South Thirteenth Street, San Jose, California	Mission Revival style	
1904	Outdoor Art Club	1 West Blithedale Avenue, Mill Valley, Marin County, California	NRHP-listed	
1906, rebuilt 1924	Hillside Club	Cedar Street, North Berkeley	Berkeley Landmark; original 1906 clubhouse destroyed in 1923 Berkeley Fire. Maybeck's brother-in-law, John White, designed current clubhouse in 1924.	
1908	Andrew Cowper Lawson House	1515 La Loma Avenue, Berkeley, California	Berkeley Landmark	
1909	Goslinsky Residence	3233 Pacific Avenue, San Francisco, California		
1909	Roos House	3500 Jackson Street, Pacific Heights, San Francisco, California	Tudor Revival and other styles; NRHP-listed & San Francisco Landmark	
1910	First Church of Christ, Scientist (Berkeley, California)	2619 Dwight Way, Berkeley, California	NRHP-listed	
1912	Rose Walk	La Loma Park neighborhood in North Berkeley, California	Public outdoor stairway and landscape	
1913	Chick House	7133 Chabot Road, Oakland Hills district of Oakland, California	For Guy Hyde Chick (1868–1930), in Chabot Canyon of the Berkeley Hills; Bay regional shingle style	
1914	Temple of Wings	2800 Buena Vista Way, Berkeley, California	Designed in 1911 for Charles Calvin Boynton and Florence Treadwell Boynton, in La Loma Park neighborhood	
1914, rebuilt 1923	Kennedy-Nixon house	1537 Euclid Avenue, La Loma Park district, North Berkeley, Berkeley, California		
1914, rebuilt 1923	Maybeck Recital Hall	Euclid Avenue at Buena Vista Way, North Berkeley	Part of Kennedy-Nixon house complex	
1915, rebuilt 1965	Palace of Fine Arts	3301 Lyon Street, Marina District, San Francisco, California	Panama-Pacific Exposition building; NRHP-listed	
1915	Parsons Memorial Lodge	Tuolumne Meadows, Yosemite National Park, California	Sierra Club lodge; NRHP-listed	
1916	Erlanger House	270 Castenada Avenue, Forest Hill neighborhood, San Francisco, California		
1917	Lynwood Pacific Electric Railway Depot	Lynwood, South Los Angeles region, California		
1922	Byington Ford House	Pebble Beach, California		
1924	Bernard Maybeck house and studio	Maybeck Twin Drive, La Loma Park district, North Berkeley, California	Architect's own residence and studio	
1924-1940	Principia College campus	Elsah, Illinois	Residence halls: Anderson Hall, Brooks House, Buck House, Howard House, Rackham Court, and Sylvester House Other buildings: Chapel], Mistake (Sample) House, Morey Field House, Radford House, and Watson Science building	
1927	Phoebe Hearst Gymnasium for Women	Oxford Street, University of California, Berkeley campus	With architect Julia Morgan; NRHP-listed	
1927	Earle C. Anthony Packard Showroom	Van Ness Avenue at Ellis Street, San Francisco	Beaux-Arts style, now British Motors; San Francisco Landmark	
1927	Earle C. Anthony House	3431-3441 Waverly Drive, Los Feliz district, Los Angeles, California	Medieval, Gothic, Spanish and Tudor Revival elements. Later the Countess Bernardine Murphy Donohue estate (c.1950−c.1970) with gardens designed by Florence Yoch & Lucile Council. Later the Convent of the Sisters of the Immaculate Heart of Mary, and the Cardinal Timothy Manning House of Prayer for Priests complex (1975−2011).	
1928	Earle C. Anthony Packard Showroom	Olympic Boulevard and Hope Street, South Park district of Downtown Los Angeles	Remodel of 1911 Greene and Greene design; present day Packard Lofts condos	
1928	Associated Charities of San Francisco Building	1010 Gough Street at Eddy, San Francisco	Present day Family Service Agency of San Francisco center; San Francisco Landmark	

Historic districts with Maybeck-designed works include

- Panoramic Hill Historic District — in the Berkeley Hills, in Berkeley and Oakland Hills, Oakland, California, NRHP-listed.

Maybeck designed residences include the Boke House (1902) at 23 Panoramic Way

- Principia College Historic District — River Road, Elsah, Illinois, NRHP-listed.

Maybeck designed the 'English village' campus master plan, and campus buildings including the Colonial Revival style Chapel (1931–34) at 1 Maybeck Place.

- Professorville Historic District — roughly bounded by Embarcadero Road, Addison Avenue, and Emerson and Cowper Streets, in Palo Alto, California, NRHP-listed.

Maybeck designed the "Sunbonnet House" (1899, restored 2004) for Emma Kellogg.

- Tahoe Meadows Historic District (founded 1924) — first planned open space community in Lake Tahoe region, on US 50 between Ski Run Boulevard and Park Avenue, South Lake Tahoe, El Dorado County, California, NRHP-listed.
