= National Historic Landmark =

Designation by the US government

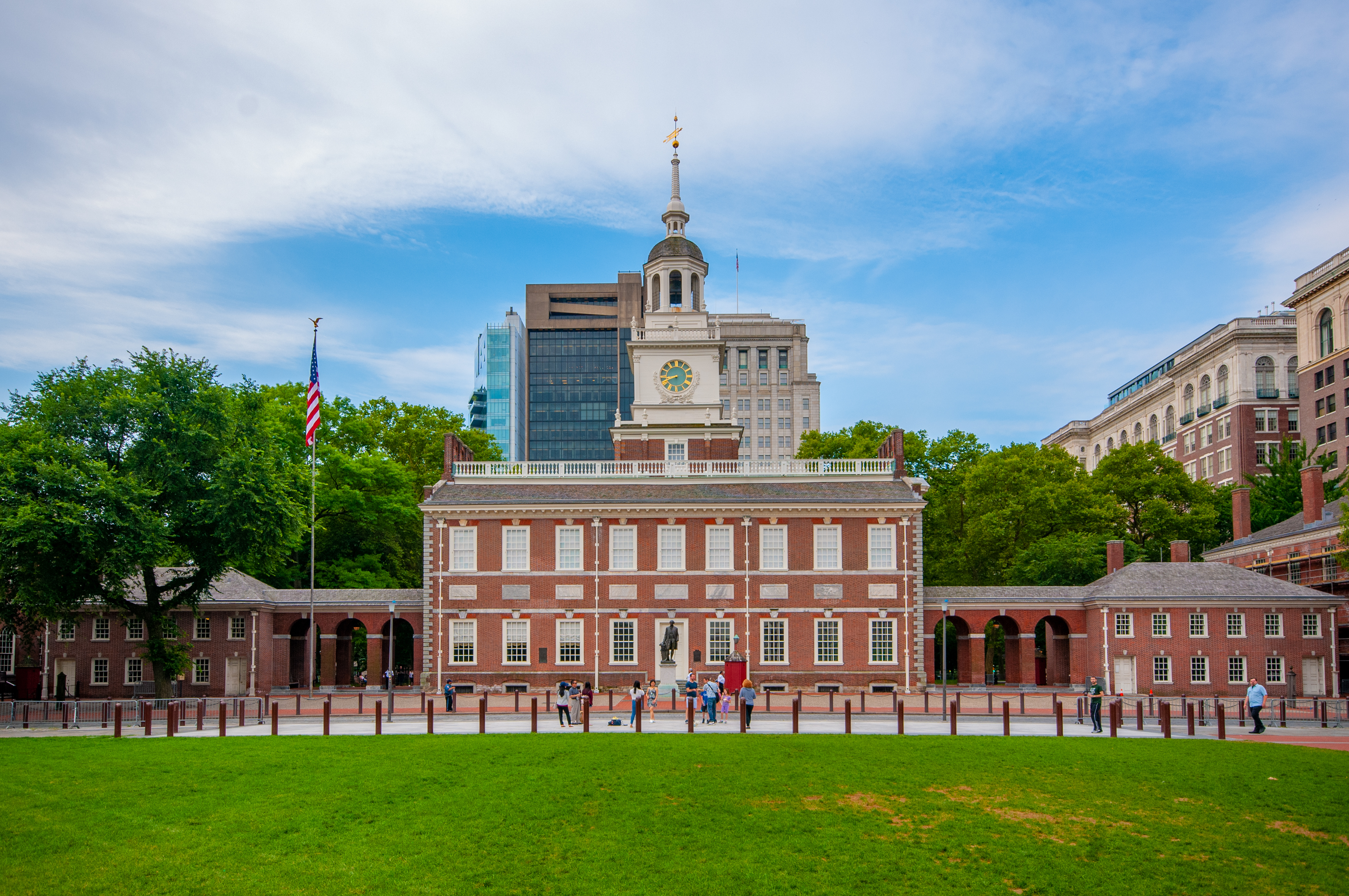
Independence National Historical Park in Philadelphia, one of the nation's most visited National Historic Landmark Districts

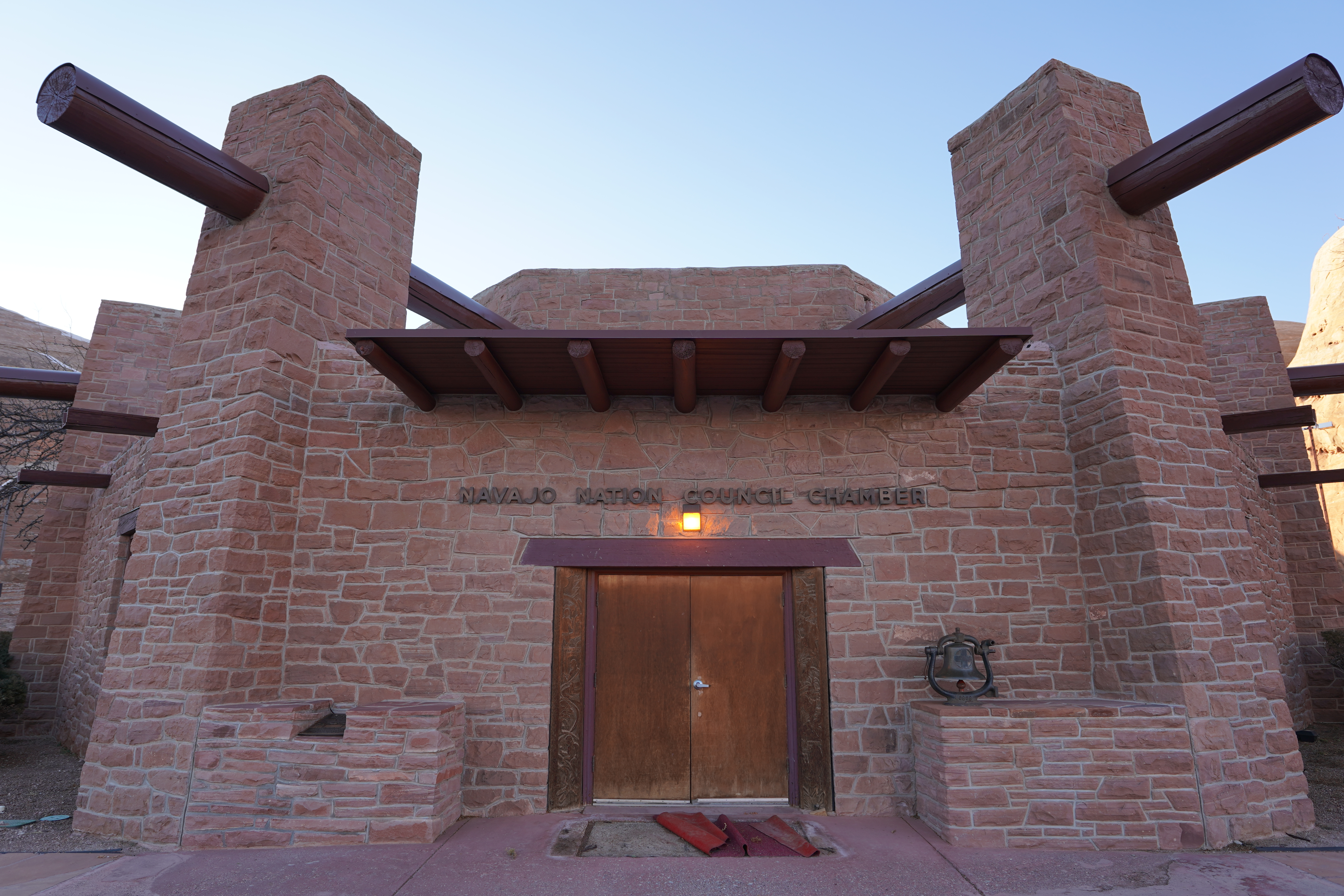
The Navajo Nation Council Chamber, the seat of government for Navajo Nation in Window Rock, Arizona, was declared a National Historic Landmark in 2004.

A National Historic Landmark (NHL) is a building, district, object, site, or structure that is officially recognized by the United States government for its outstanding historical significance. Only some 2,500, or roughly three percent, of over 90,000 places listed on the country's National Register of Historic Places (NRHP) are recognized as National Historic Landmarks.

A National Historic Landmark District may include many contributing properties that are buildings, structures, sites or objects, and it may also include non-contributing properties. Contributing properties may or may not also be separately listed as NHLs or on the NRHP.

== History ==
=== 19th century ===
The origins of the first National Historic Landmark was a simple cedar post, placed by the Lewis and Clark Expedition on their 1804 outbound trek to the Pacific Ocean in commemoration of the death from natural causes of Sergeant Charles Floyd. The cedar plank was later replaced by a 100 ft (30 m) marble obelisk. The Sergeant Floyd Monument in Sioux City, Iowa, was officially designated on June 30, 1960.

=== 20th century ===
Prior to 1935, efforts to preserve cultural heritage of national importance were made by piecemeal efforts of the United States Congress. In 1935, Congress passed the Historic Sites Act, which authorized the interior secretary authority to formally record and organize historic properties, and to designate properties as having "national historical significance", and gave the National Park Service authority to administer historically significant federally owned properties. Over the following decades, surveys such as the Historic American Buildings Survey amassed information about culturally and architecturally significant properties in a program known as the Historic Sites Survey.

Most of the designations made under this legislation became National Historic Sites, although the first designation, made December 20, 1935, was for a National Memorial, the Gateway Arch National Park, then known as the Jefferson National Expansion Memorial, in St. Louis, Missouri. The first National Historic Site designation was made for the Salem Maritime National Historic Site on March 17, 1938.

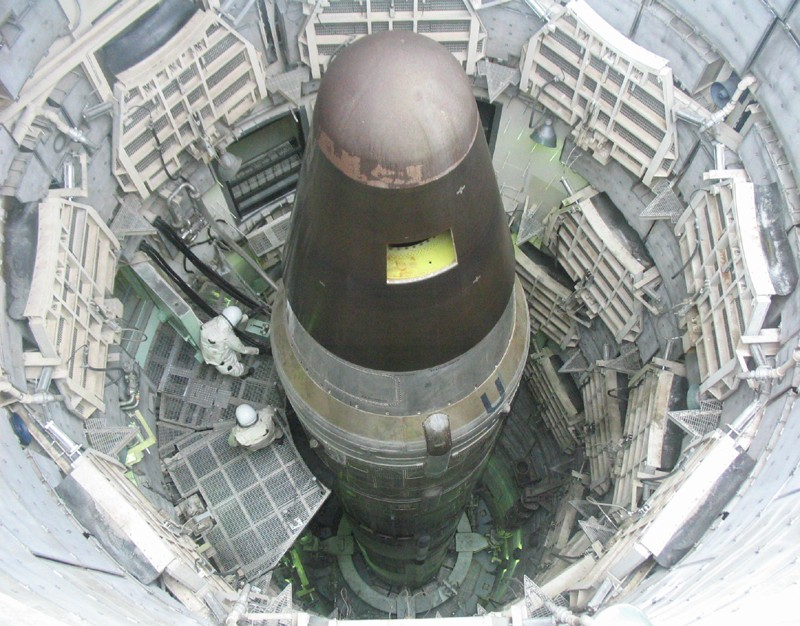
The Titan Missile Museum in Tucson, Arizona, a National Historic Landmark

In 1960, the National Park Service began administering the survey data gathered under this legislation, and the National Historic Landmark program began to take more formal shape. When the National Register of Historic Places was established in 1966, the National Historic Landmark program was encompassed within it, and rules and procedures for inclusion and designation were formalized. Because listings (either on the National Register, or as an NHL) often triggered local preservation laws, legislation in 1980 amended the listing procedures to require owner agreement to the designations.

On October 9, 1960, 92 places, properties, or districts were announced as eligible to be designated NHLs by U.S. Secretary of the Interior Fred A. Seaton. Agreements of owners or responsible parties were subsequently obtained, but all 92 have since been considered listed on that 1960 date. (Note: The October 9, 1960, document is included in correspondence with the City of Charleston, South Carolina, whose Charleston Historic District was included in the list, as one of five historic districts named amongst the 92. The National Archives and Records Administration currently provides at "Charleston Historic District" is very different from a regular National Register of Historic Places (NRHP) or NHL submission; it includes no NRHP or NHL forms at all. It includes correspondence relating to the designation of the Charleston Historic District as an NHL, and correspondence on later threats, further detail on some properties in the district, a nationwide study detailing the places eligible for NHL designation in 1960, a list of these locations, which was conveyed in an October 9, 1960, release from U.S. Secretary of the Interior Fred A. Seaton and includes a nationwide list of sites eligible for inclusion. An outline of themes identified in the National Survey of Historic Sites and Buildings, which the U.S. Department of the Interior was authorized to undertake in 1935 legislation. (Charleston Mayor J. Palmer Gaillard Jr. formally accepted the designation in 1961; three NHL candidate places were named as not having indicated interest to accept the designation. Two letters, in 1966 and 1970, refer to the Charleston Historic District having been designated an NHL in October 1963. However, later NPS documents including this archived 2007 list of NHLs treats the Charleston Historic District and others as having been listed as NHLs on October 9, 1960, which includes correspondence, photos, plans, more. NARA collection of documents associated with Charleston Historic District. National Archives and Records Administration. Archived from the original on May 29, 2022. 347 pages.)

== Criteria ==
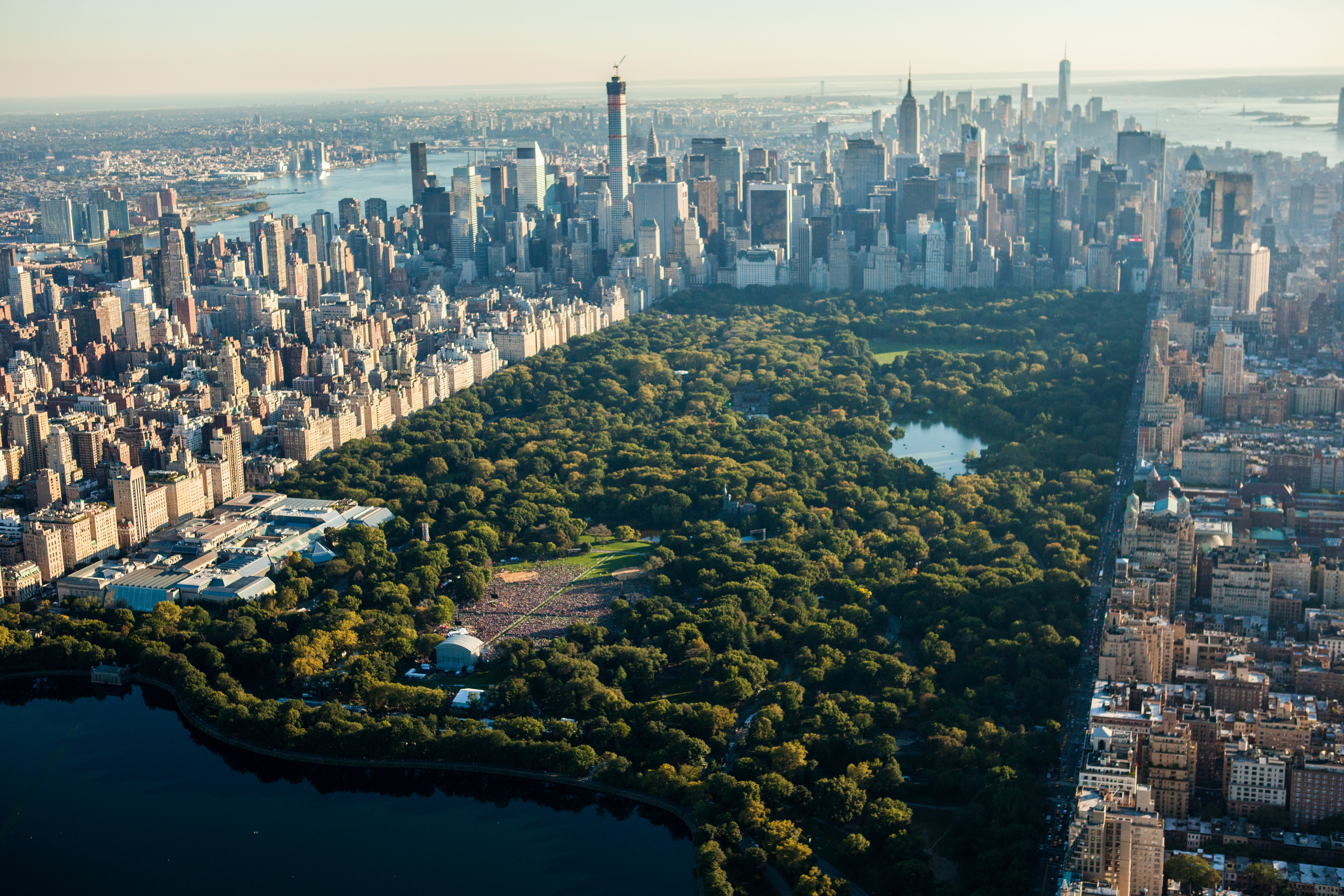
Central Park in New York City, a prominent National Historic Landmark; New York City has 116 NHLs, more than any other city in the U.S.

NHLs are designated by the United States secretary of the interior because they are:

- Sites, where events of national historical significance occurred;
- Places where prominent persons lived or worked;
- Icons of ideals that shaped the nation;
- Outstanding examples of design or construction;
- Places characterizing a way of life; or.
- Archeological sites able to yield information.

== Current National Historic Landmarks ==
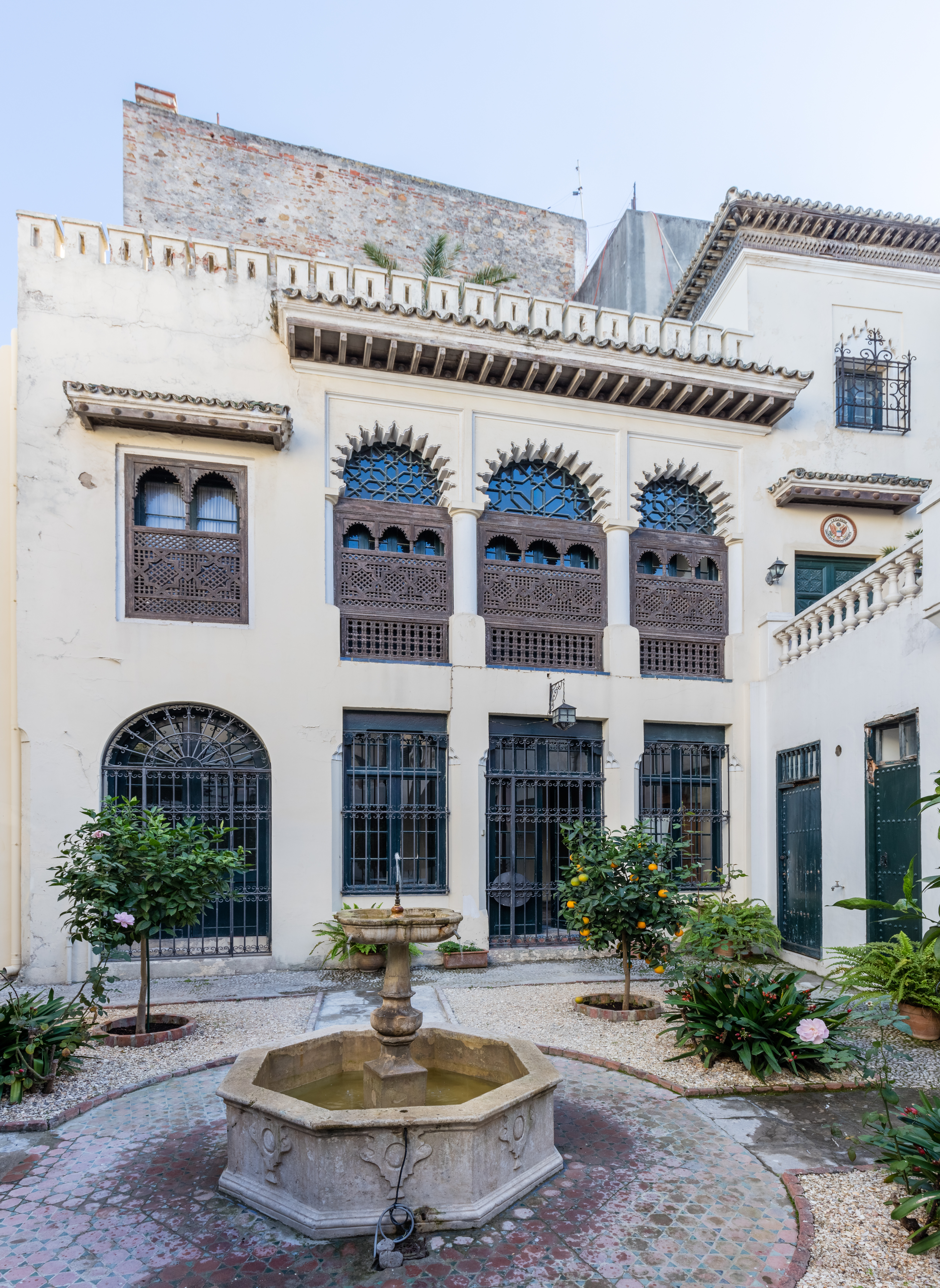
The American Legation in Tangier in Morocco, the first National Historic Landmark on foreign soil

More than 2,500 NHLs have been designated. Most, but not all, are in the United States. There are NHLs in all 50 states and the national capital of Washington, D.C. Three states (Pennsylvania, Massachusetts, and New York) account for nearly 25 percent of the nation's NHLs. Each of three cities within these states, Philadelphia, Boston, and New York City, has by itself more NHLs than 40 of the 50 states. New York City alone has more NHLs than all but five states: Virginia, California, Pennsylvania, Massachusetts, and New York, the latter of which has the most NHLs of all 50 states. There are 74 NHLs in the District of Columbia.

Some NHLs are in U.S. commonwealths and territories, associated states, and foreign states. There are 15 in Puerto Rico, the Virgin Islands, and other U.S. commonwealths and territories; five in U.S.-associated states such as Micronesia; and one in Morocco.

Over 100 ships or shipwrecks have been designated as NHLs.

Approximately half of the National Historic Landmarks are privately owned. The National Historic Landmarks Program relies on suggestions for new designations from the National Park Service, which also assists in maintaining the landmarks. A friends' group of owners and managers, the National Historic Landmark Stewards Association, works to preserve, protect and promote National Historic Landmarks.

If not already listed on the National Register of Historic Places, an NHL is automatically added to the Register upon designation; about three percent of Register listings are NHLs. Washington, D.C. is home to three specifically legislated exceptions to this rule: the White House, the United States Capitol, and the United States Supreme Court Building. All are designated as NHLs, but are not on the National Register.

== See also ==
- American Water Landmark
- Listed building, a similar designation in the UK
- List of churches that are National Historic Landmarks in the United States
- List of U.S. National Historic Landmark ships, shipwrecks, and shipyards
- List of U.S. National Historic Landmarks by state
- National Historic Sites, Events, and Persons, similar designations in Canada
- National Natural Landmark
- United States memorials
- United States National Register of Historic Places listings
