= Pittsfield Public Library =

- U.S. National Register of Historic Places
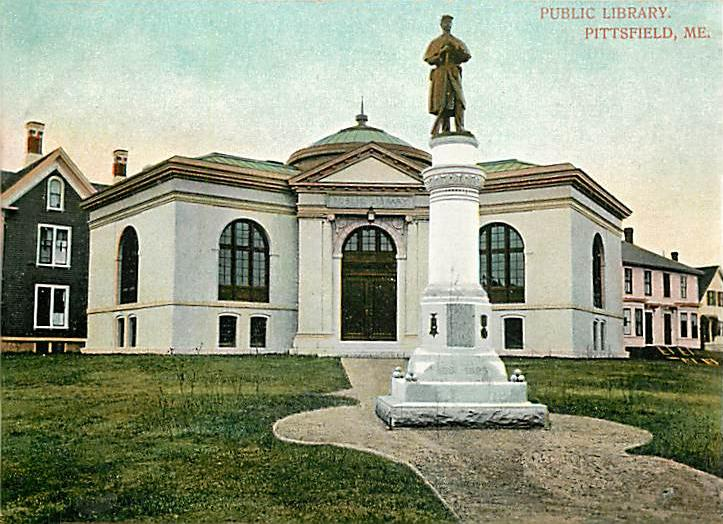
- Early 20th century postcard view

- Location within Maine Location within the United States
- Location: 110 Library St., Pittsfield, Maine
- Coordinates: 44°46′55″N 69°23′0″W
- Area: 0.5 acres (0.20 ha)
- Built: 1903
- Built by: M.C. Foster and Sons
- Architect: Albert Randolph Ross
- Architectural style: Beaux- Arts
- NRHP reference No.: 83000471
- Added to NRHP: January 4, 1983

The Pittsfield Public Library is located at 110 Library Street in Pittsfield, Maine. The building it occupies is a Beaux-Arts building designed by Albert Randolph Ross, and was built in 1903-04 with funding assistance from Andrew Carnegie. The building was listed on the National Register of Historic Places in 1983. It is one of the state's oldest Beaux-Arts buildings, and one of the most architecturally distinctive in the town.

== Architecture and history ==
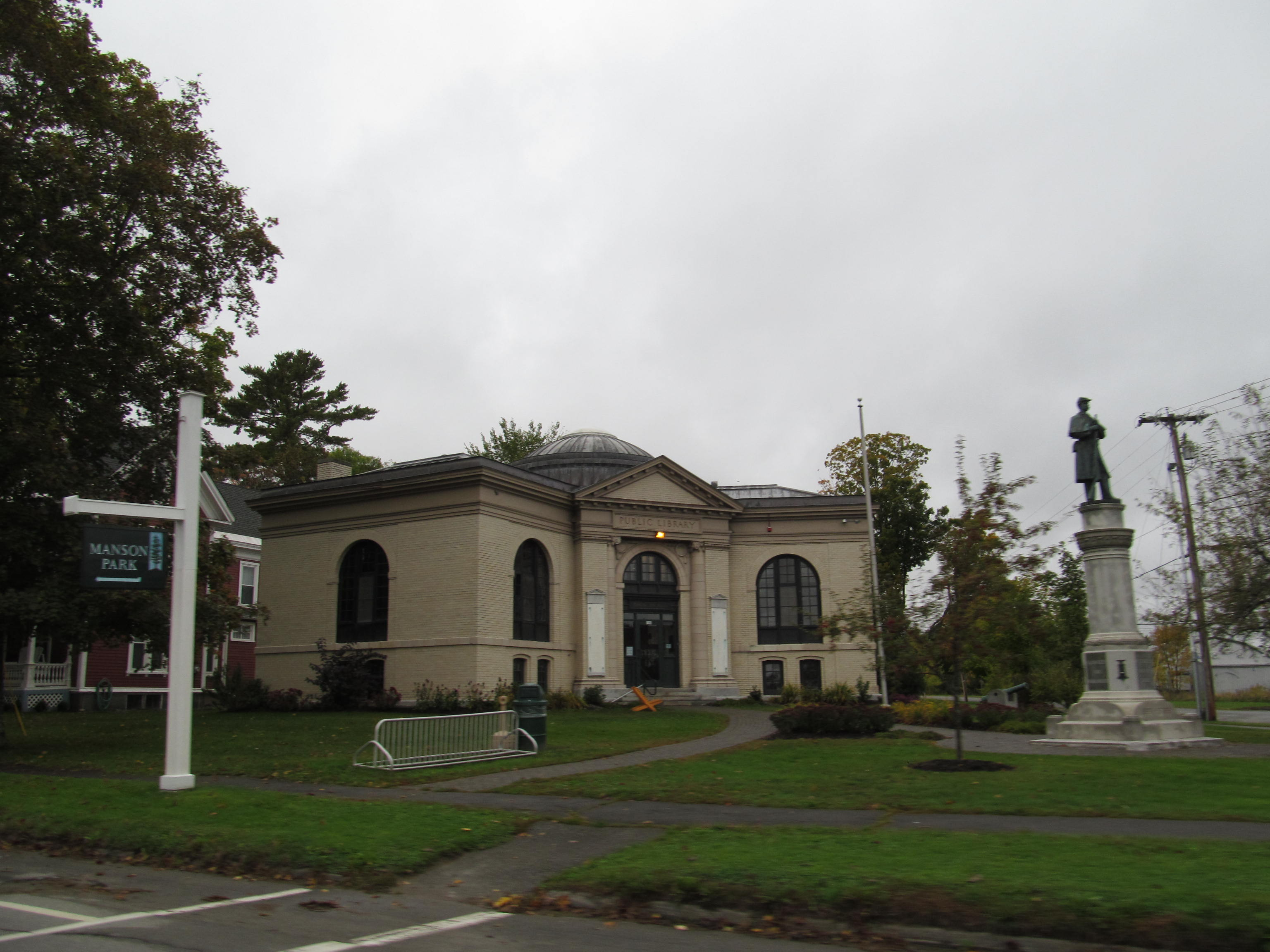
The library in 2012

The Pittsfield Public Library is set on a roughly square lot at the southwest corner of Library and Main Streets, just across the railroad tracks south of the town center. The building is oriented facing toward the corner, fronted by a grassy plaza, with a central domed section flanked by rectangular wings radiating to either side. The entrance is at the center, in a round-arch opening flanked by engaged columns and topped by a gabled Classical pediment. The building is constructed out of white brick, and rests on the granite foundation. The interior is organized with the librarian's desk at the center, with stacks radiating behind it, and reading rooms with bookcases in the wings. The basement has been adapted to house additional stacks.

The library's creation was facilitated by the efforts of local mill owner Robert Dodson, and by a funding grant from philanthropist Andrew Carnegie. The designer was Albert Randolph Ross, an architect from New York City, who designed two other Maine libraries, including one at Good Will-Hinckley, also funded by Carnegie.

== Physical Appearance ==
The building was erected in 1903 by Waterville contractor M. C. Foster & Son, and opened to the public in June, 1904.

The plan of the building makes excellent use of its square corner site. The library is a one-story ‘Palladian Villa’ consisting of a circular central chamber, capped by a shallow dome, from which two identical rectangular wings sweep outward to form a 135° angle. The wings are roughly equivalent in area to the central chamber, and are topped by shallow hipped roofs which meet the dome at its base. The leading gateway opens into the central chamber at the angle formed by the two wings, and is surrounded by a shallow classical frame of pilasters, columns, entablature, and pediment. The building’s unusual shape allows it to fit into one corner of its square lot (in the angle farthest from either street) and so use the bulk of the lot as a grassy plaza.

The library is constructed of white pressed brick with a granite foundation and base trim. The entablature which runs around the building’s eaves, as well as the pediment and decorative work above the front entrance, are of terra-cotta. On a section of the entablature over the entrance is painted ‘Public Library’, and a smaller message between the door and transom window reads ‘Open to All’, The roof and dome are copper. A tiny copper finial was detached from the dome’s crown not long ago.

The library’s central chamber is reached by climbing a series of steps from the vestibule space inside the front door. The circular chamber is bisected by the librarian’s desk, behind which six tall bookcases fan in a semi-circle against the chamber’s rear wall. The chamber’s dome and supporting pilasters of Keene cement were originally painted a buff color, but were recently white-washed in preparation for a mural. There is some evidence that a mural was executed in an earlier period, but later painted over. The chamber includes a small bathroom, office, and some closet-space as well.

Every wing of the library is a sizable reading room with wooden bookcases and tables. All furniture and woodwork of the library is made of Western brown ash stained to imitate Flemish oak.

The basement, originally used as storage space, has recently been remodeled into a reading room‒–stack area.

== Significance ==
Pittsfield Public Library is one of Maine’s most distinctive small town ‘Carnegie Libraries’. It is one of the earliest examples of a Beaux Arts building in central Maine. Besides, the library is among the most notable of Pittsfield’s Buildings from any period.

The library was gifted to the town by Andrew Carnegie and through the will of local entrepreneur Robert Dodson, the founder of the Pittsfield Woolen Industry. Dodson resembled Carnegie in being a Scottish immigrant who rose to captain an American industry.

After heated debate throughout early 1903 on the selection of a library site, Pittsfield citizens chose the present location because of its closeness to the Maine Central Railroad Station and Tracks. The town was concerned that the library would be conspicuous to train passengers.

Architect Ross was responsible for two other Maine libraries, those at Old Town (1904), and Good Will Farm in Hinckley (1906). Although the latter is similar in design to the Pittsfield Library, neither is as successful. Ross is best known for the Washington, D. C. public library of 1900-01.

The Pittsfield Library is among the first Beaux Arts buildings in Maine, and is certainly the earliest example of the style in Somerset County. The Library's angular floor-plan is unique in the state.

== See also ==
- List of Carnegie libraries in Maine
- National Register of Historic Places listings in Somerset County, Maine
