= Albert Randolph Ross =

American architect

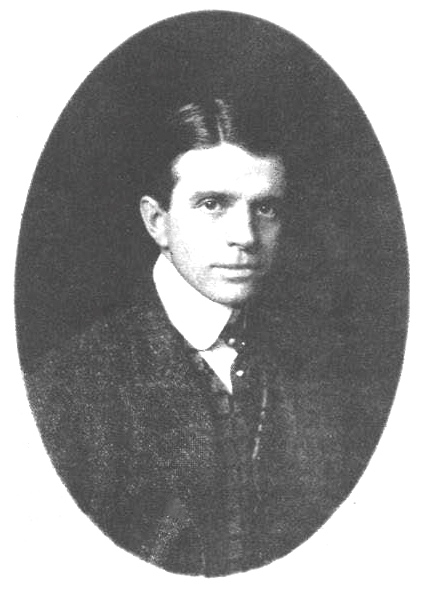
Albert Randolph Ross, Architect

Albert Randolph Ross (October 26, 1868 – October 27, 1948) was an American architect, known primarily for designing libraries, especially those funded by Andrew Carnegie. His father, John W. Ross, was an architect based in Davenport, Iowa, and the architect of its city hall.

== Education and career ==
Albert Randolph Ross was born in 1868 in Westfield, Massachusetts, a son of architect John W. Ross. In 1874, the father relocated his practice to Davenport, Iowa, where Albert Ross graduated from high school in 1884.

After working from 1884 to 1887 as a draftsman in his father's office, Ross moved to New York where he studied sculpture at the Metropolitan Museum of Art. He worked for a year for architect Charles Day Swan in Buffalo, New York, and beginning in 1891 through 1897, for the architecture firm McKim, Mead and White in New York. In 1898, he formed a partnership under the name of Ackerman & Ross with architect William S. Ackerman, a partnership they dissolved in 1901.

In 1927, when he was awarded a $10,000 prize in a competition to design a new courthouse for Milwaukee out of 33 who submitted proposals, he told the Milwaukee Journal why he settled on a traditional design:

When I went into the competition I considered whether to design a building in the modern and experimental trend for a great public courthouse. I made modern sketches, but in my opinion they fell flat for this purpose. They were not typical and expressive of public work, so I turned to that type established by our forefathers.... I have no quarrel with trends in modern architecture. I take a fling at it myself. But it simply won't do for public buildings. It violates the dictates of a definite style built up through one hundred and fifty years of our history. A departure into modernism would not be suitable for a courthouse. We must be trained slowly to things violently new. The public's money cannot rightly be used to force experiments down its throat.

== Principal architectural works ==
=== Ackerman & Ross ===
- Carnegie Library of Washington D.C., Washington, DC, an NRHP-listed work of Ackerman & Ross (1902).
- Carnegie Library, Atlanta, Georgia, by Ackerman & Ross (1902).
- Carnegie Laboratory of Engineering, Stevens Institute, Hoboken, New Jersey, by Ackerman & Ross (1902).
- Carnegie Library, San Diego, California, by Ackerman & Ross (1903; demolished 1952).
- Port Jervis Free Library, Port Jervis, New York, by Ackerman & Ross (1903).

=== Albert Randolph Ross ===
- Carnegie Library, Atlantic City, New Jersey (1903).
- Taunton Public Library, Taunton, Massachusetts (1903).
- East Orange Public Library, East Orange, New Jersey, now the East Orange Municipal Court Building (1903).
- Nashville Main Library, Nashville, Tennessee (1904).
- Needham Public Library, Needham, Massachusetts (built 1904; demolished)
- Needham Free Public Library, Needham, Massachusetts (1904).
- Old Town Public Library, Old Town, Maine (1904).
- Gloversville Free Library, Gloversville, New York, Beaux Arts building listed on the National Register of Historic Places (1904).
- Pittsfield Public Library, Pittsfield, Maine; NRHP-listed for its architecture (1904).
- Union County Courthouse, Elizabeth, New Jersey as Ackerman & Ross (1905)."
- Public Library, Penn Yan, New York, (dedicated June 22, 1905).
- Cragin Memorial Library, Colchester, Connecticut (dedicated July 5, 1905).
- Uinta County Library, Evanston, Wyoming, now the Uinta County Museum (completed 1906).
- Pennsylvania Memorial, Vicksburg National Military Park, with Charles Albert Lopez, sculptor (dedicated March 24, 1906).
- Original portion of the Main Library of the Columbus Metropolitan Library system, Columbus, Ohio (dedicated April 4, 1907).
- Carnegie Library, Good Will Home Association, Hinckley, Maine (dedicated May 29, 1907).
- McKinley Memorial, Philadelphia, Pennsylvania, with Charles Albert Lopez and Isidore Konti, sculptors (dedicated June 6, 1908).
- Exterior design for Draper Hall, State University at Albany, Albany, New York (1909).
- Union Soldiers and Sailors Monument, Baltimore, designed by Ross with sculpture by Adolph Alexander Weinman (1909).
- Carnegie Library, Denver, Colorado; now the McNichols Civic Center Building (1910).
- Montclair Art Museum, Montclair, New Jersey (1914).
- New Rochelle Public Library (completed May 1914).
- Cheney Library, Hoosick Falls, New York (dedicated November 21, 1923).
- Public Safety Building, Milwaukee, Wisconsin (completed 1929; Alfred C. Clas, associated architect)
- Milwaukee County Courthouse, Milwaukee, Wisconsin (1931).

== Personal life ==
In 1901, Ross married Susan Husted, from Brookline, Massachusetts. From 1901 until 1948 his main residence was in New York City, but he also maintained a summer residence on Negro Island, near Boothbay Harbor, Maine, where he died on October 27, 1948.

== Gallery ==
Media related to Albert Randolph Ross at Wikimedia Commons

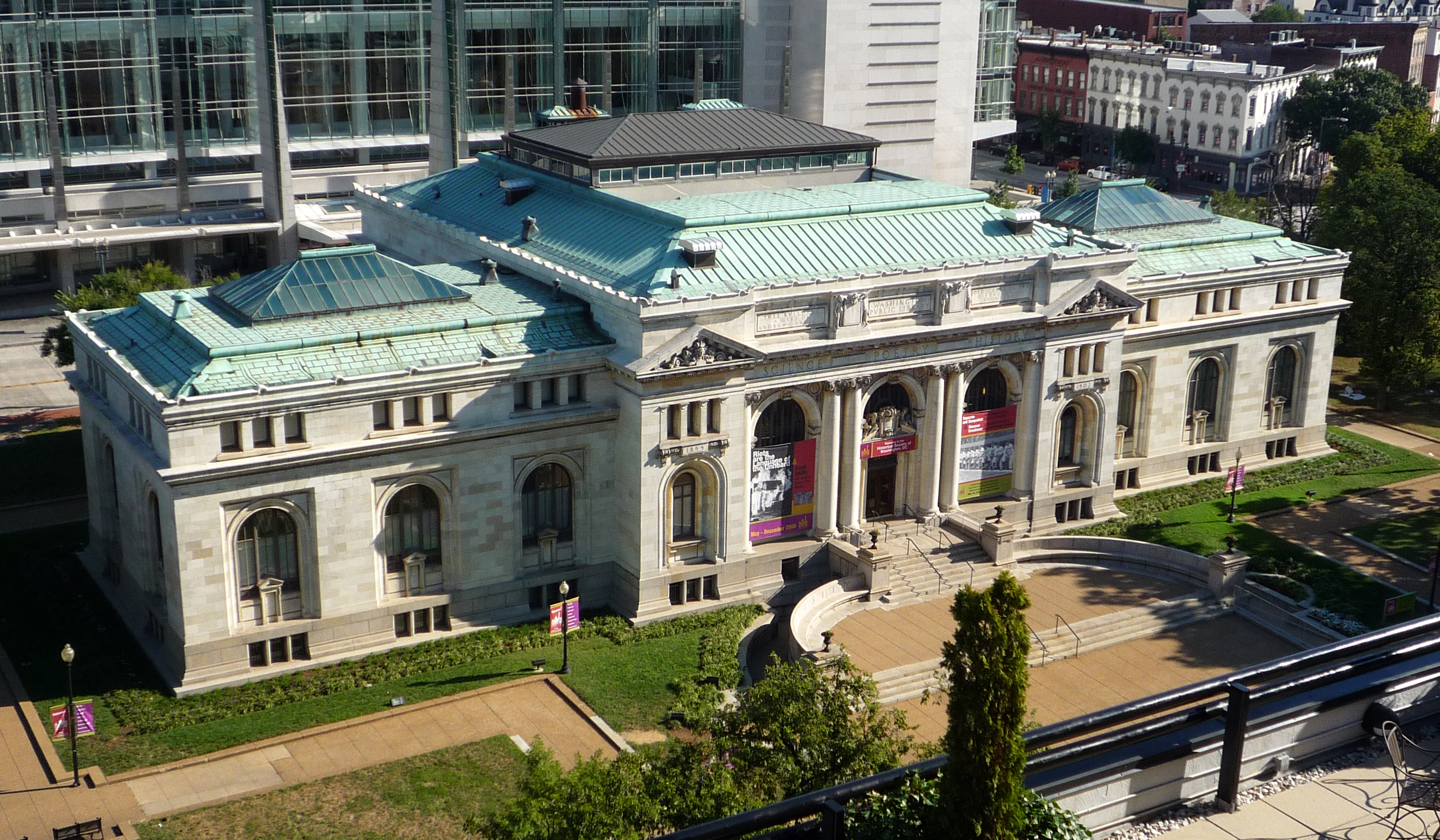
The Central Public Library (now the Historical Society of Washington, D.C.), completed 1902 by Ackerman & Ross.

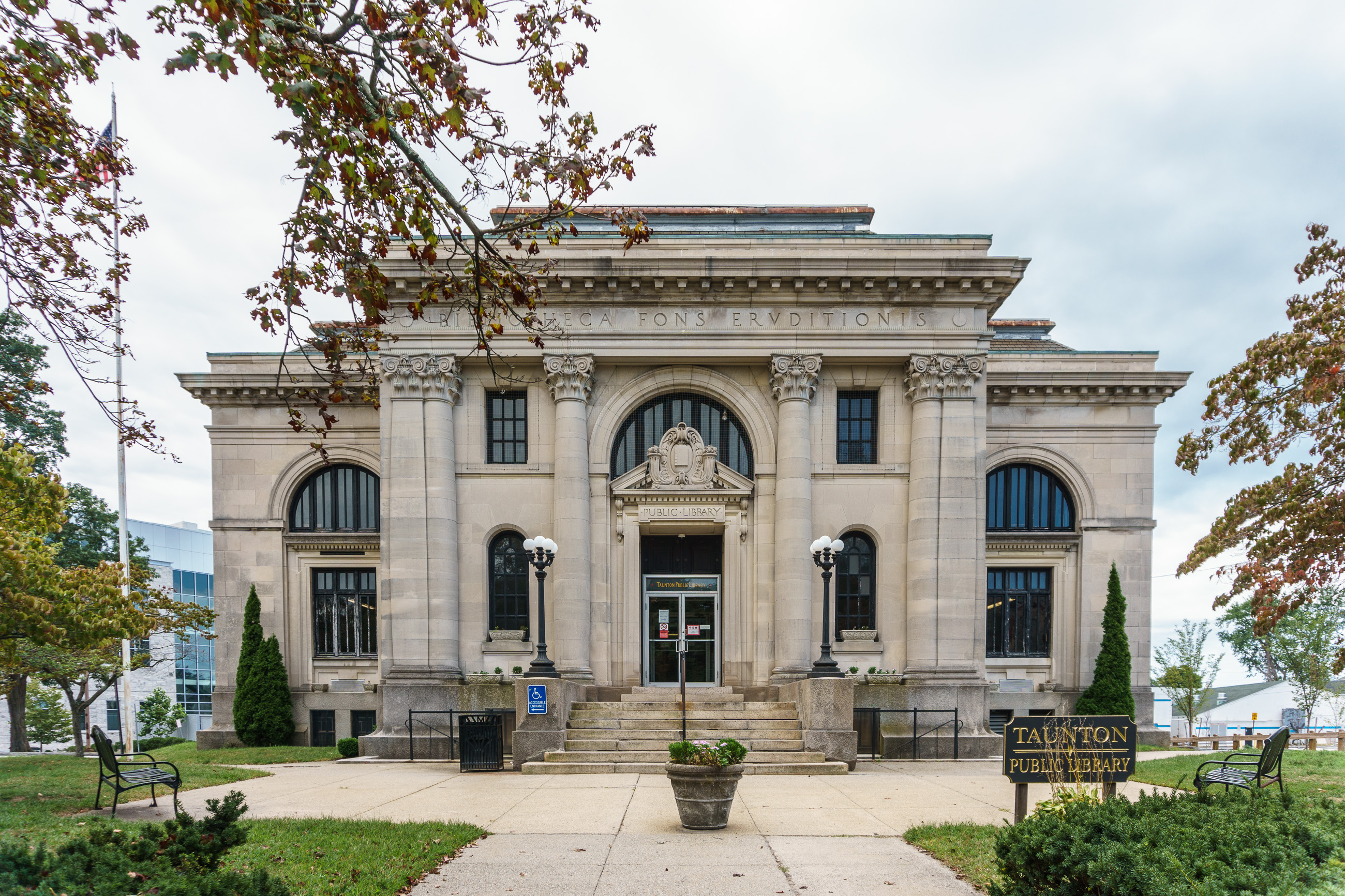
Taunton Public Library, Taunton, Massachusetts, completed 1903.

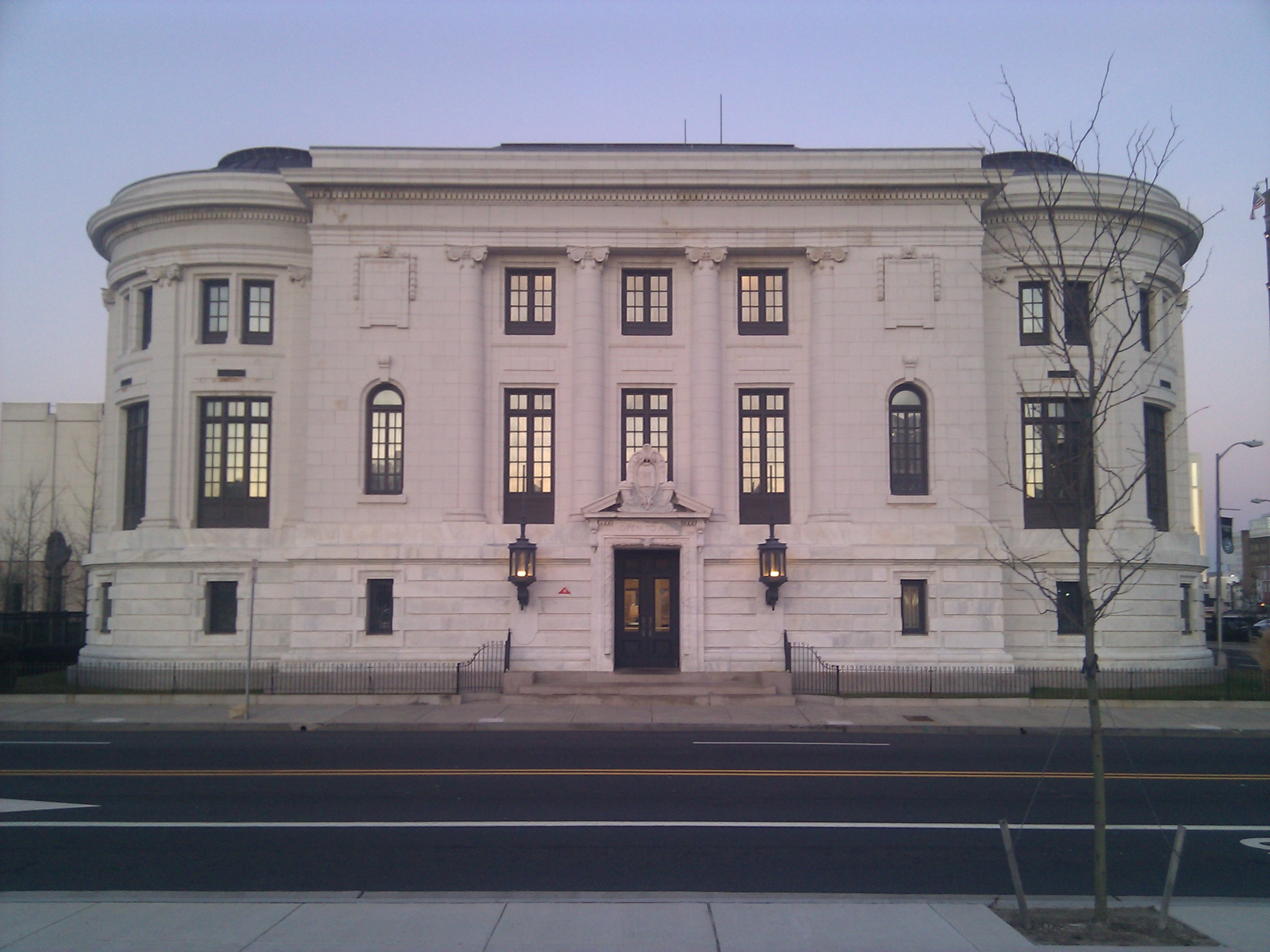
Carnegie Library, Atlantic City, New Jersey, completed in 1903.

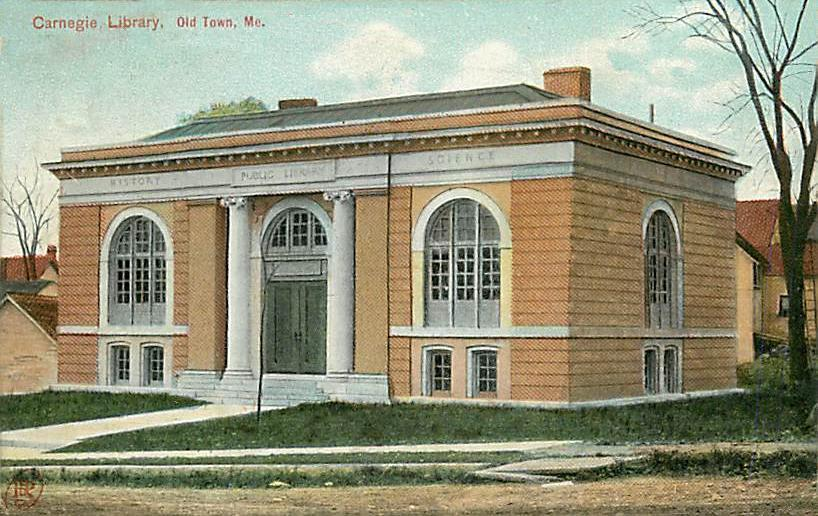
Carnegie Library, Old Town, Maine, completed 1904.

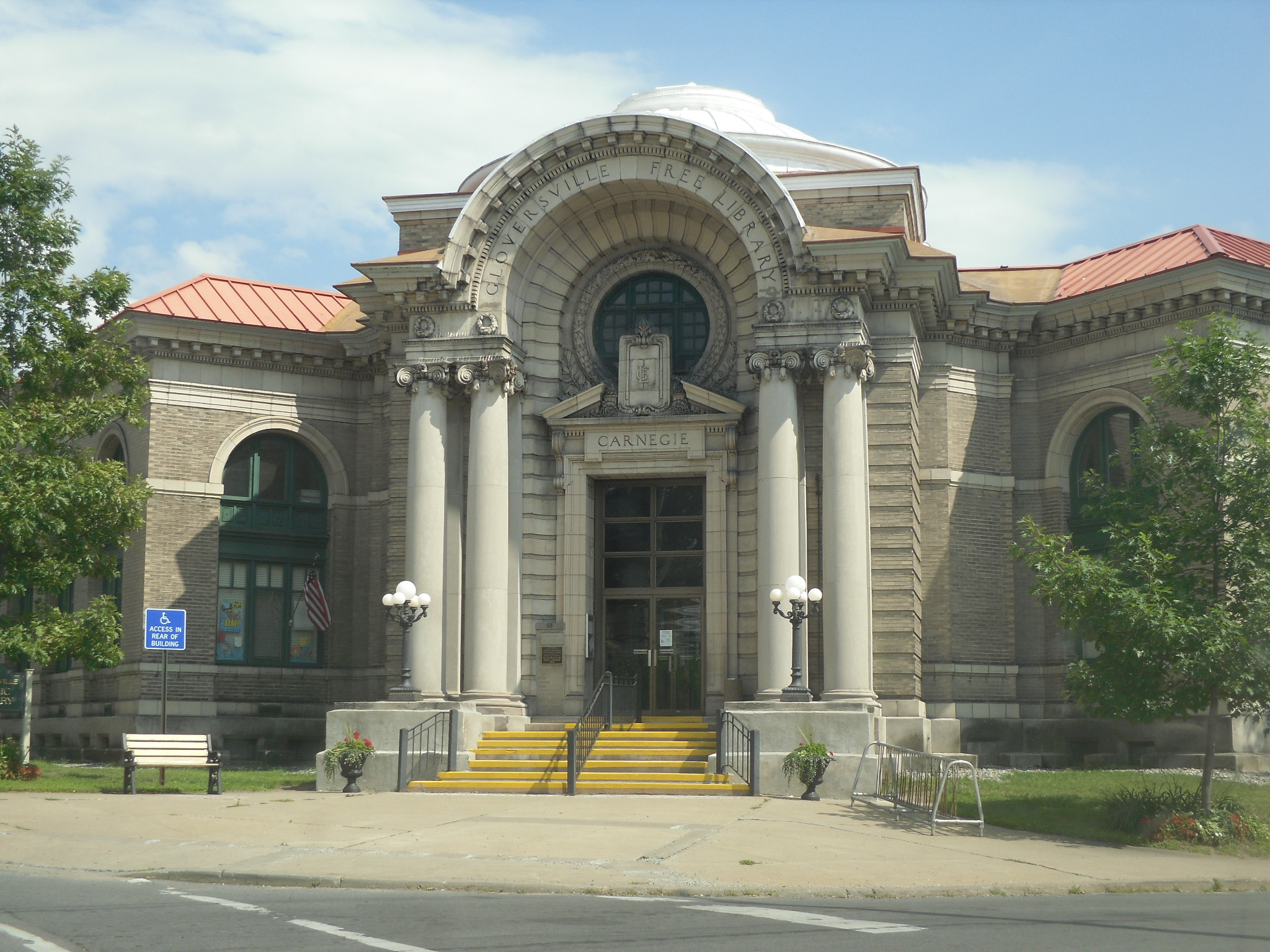
Gloversville Free Library, Gloversville, New York, completed in 1904.

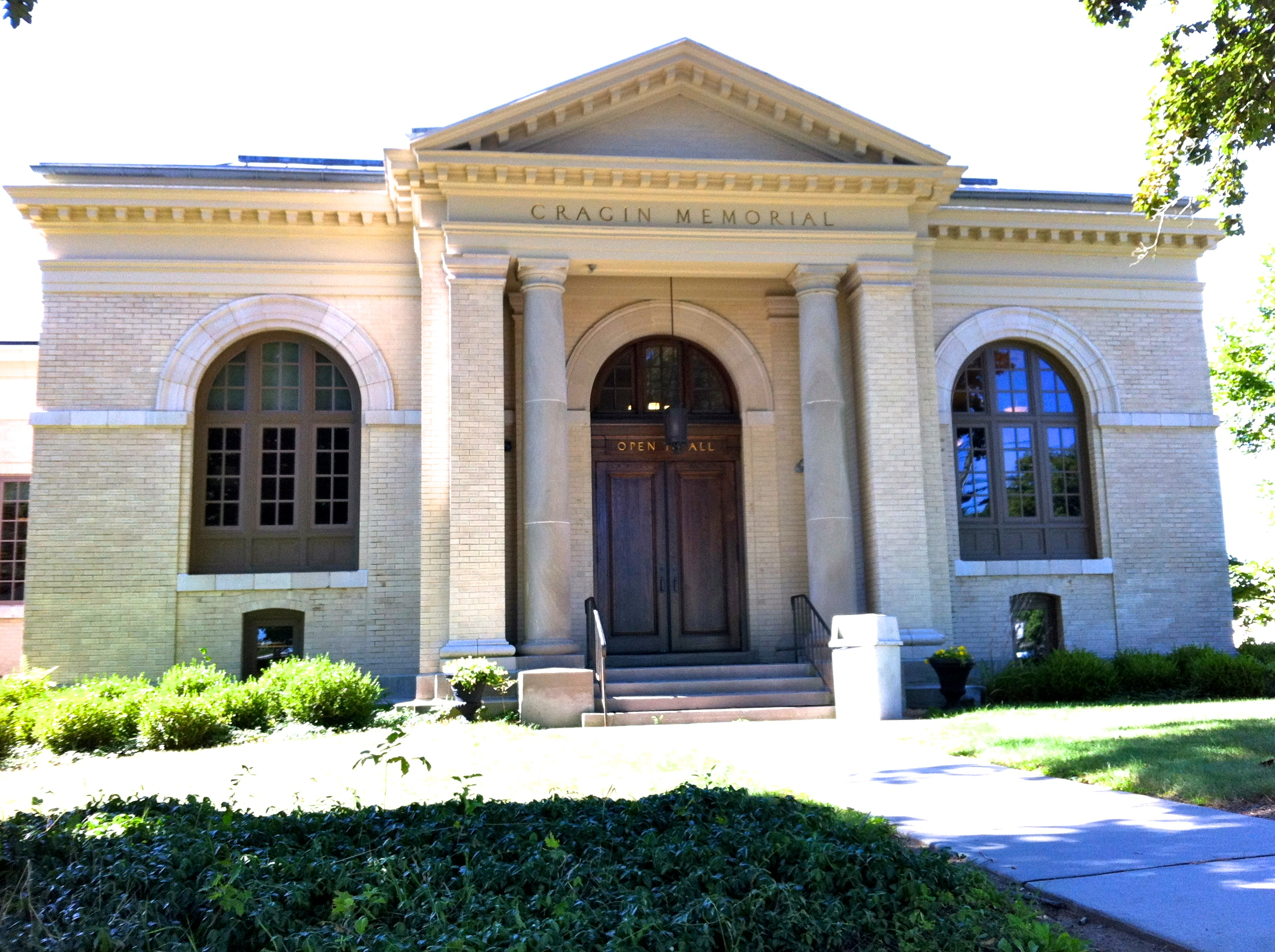
Cragin Memorial Library, Colchester, Connecticut, dedicated July 5, 1905.

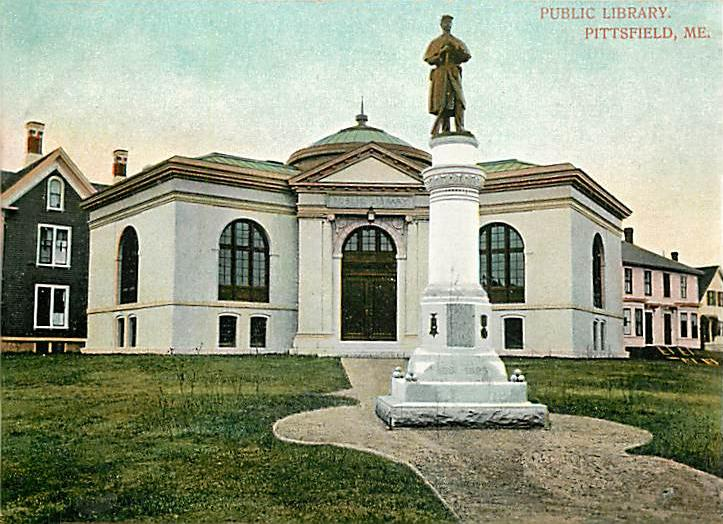
Public Library, Pittsfield, Maine, completed in 1906.

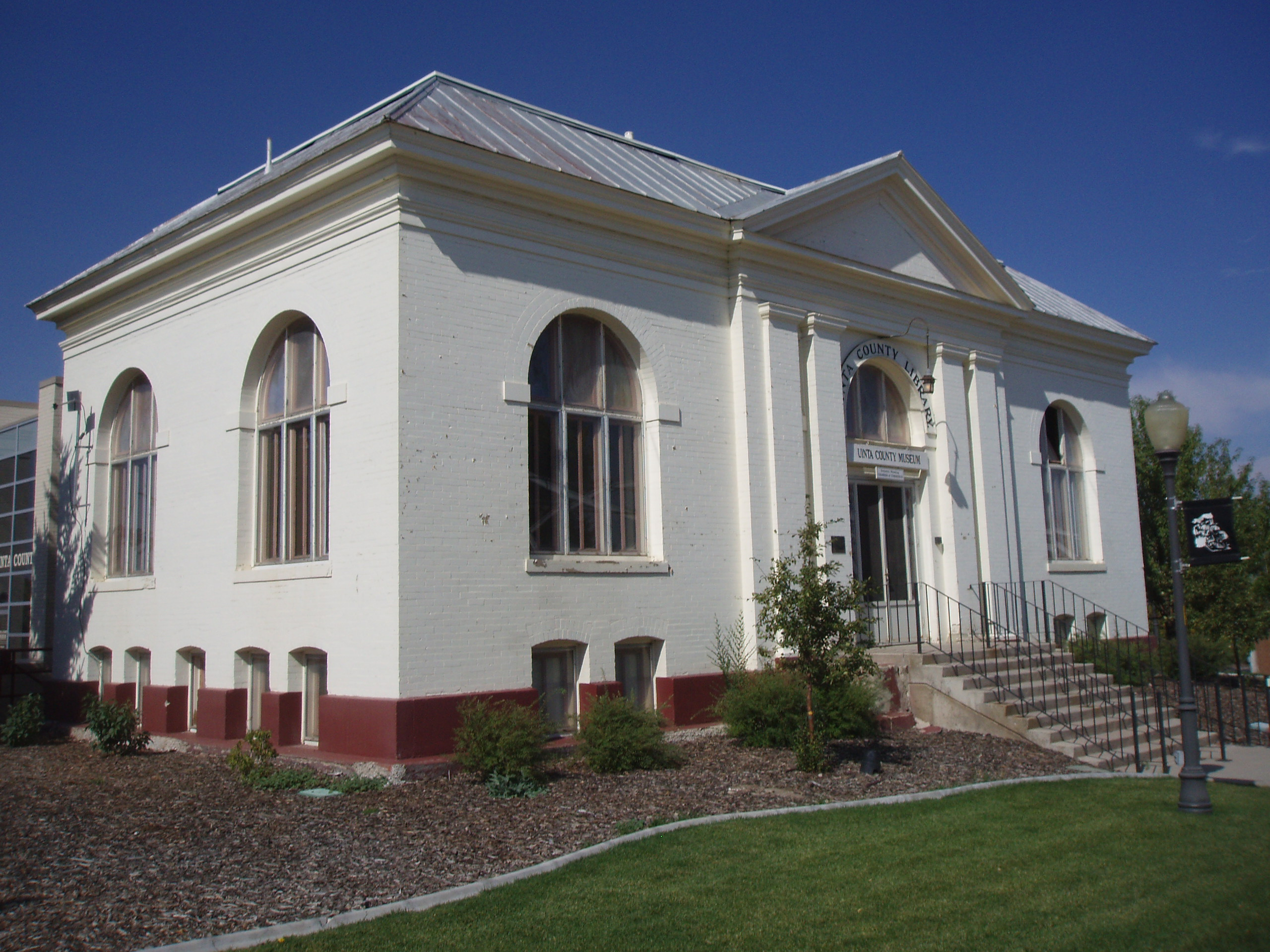
Uinta County Library, Evanston, Wyoming, completed in 1906.

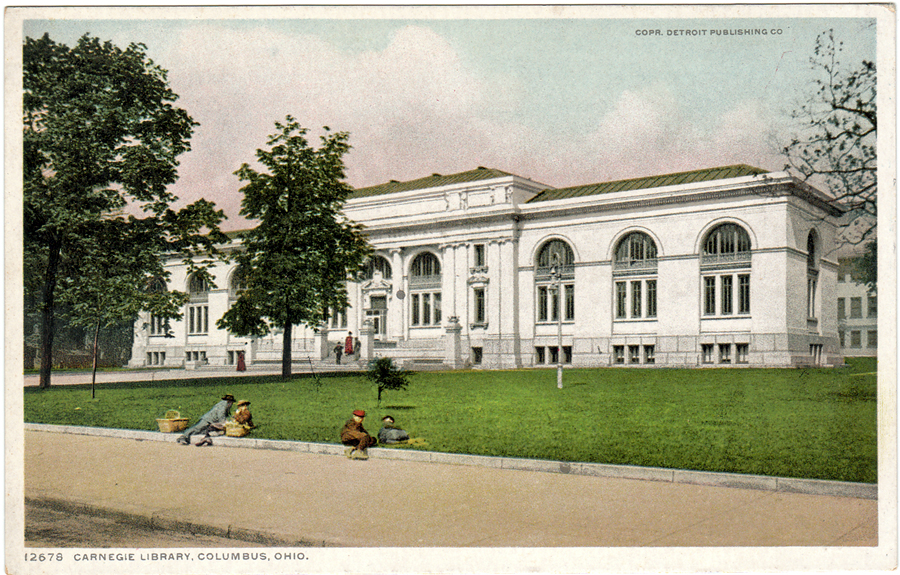
Carnegie Library, Columbus, Ohio, completed in 1907.

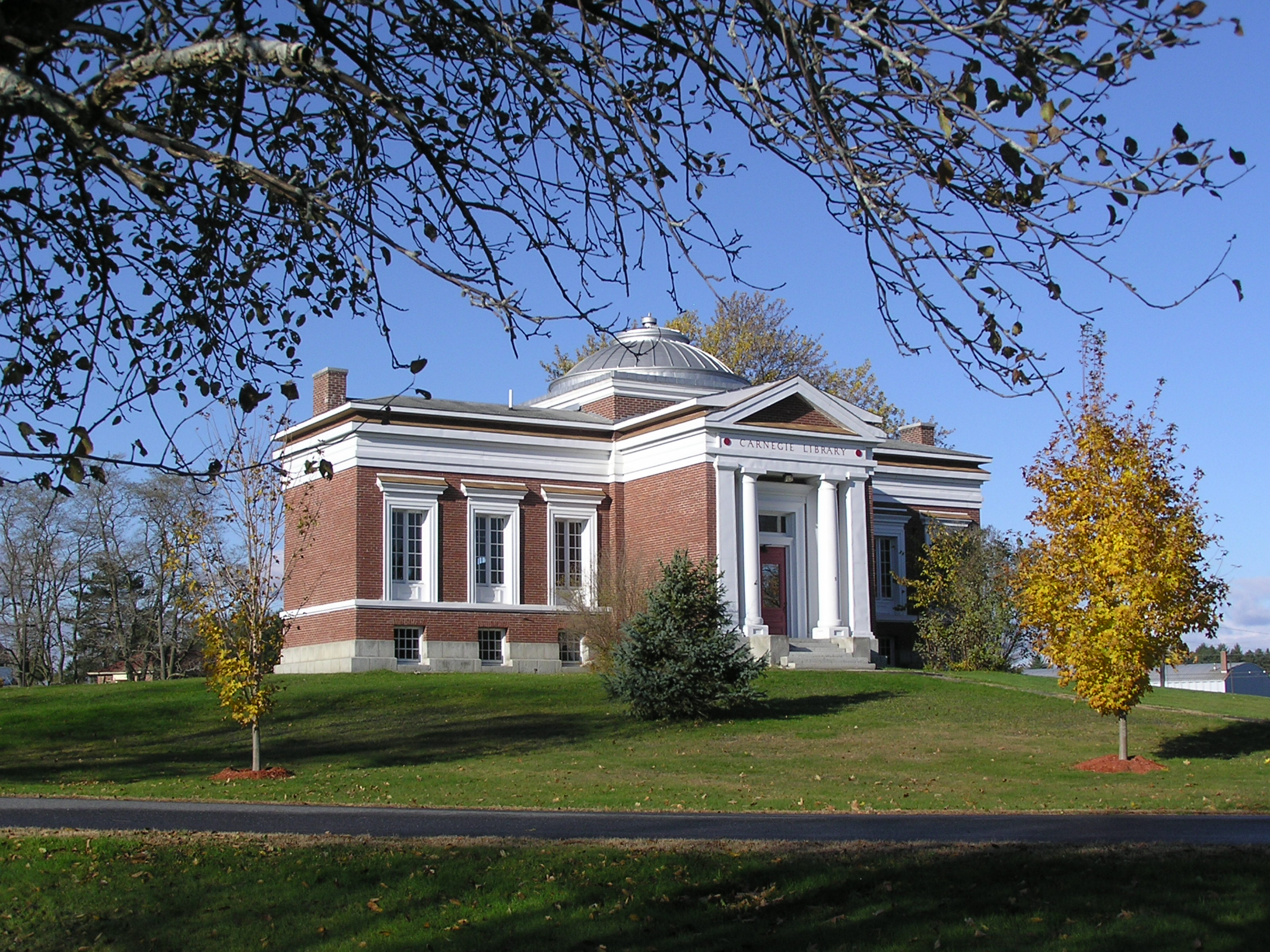
Good Will-Hinckley Library, Hinckley, Maine, dedicated in 1907.

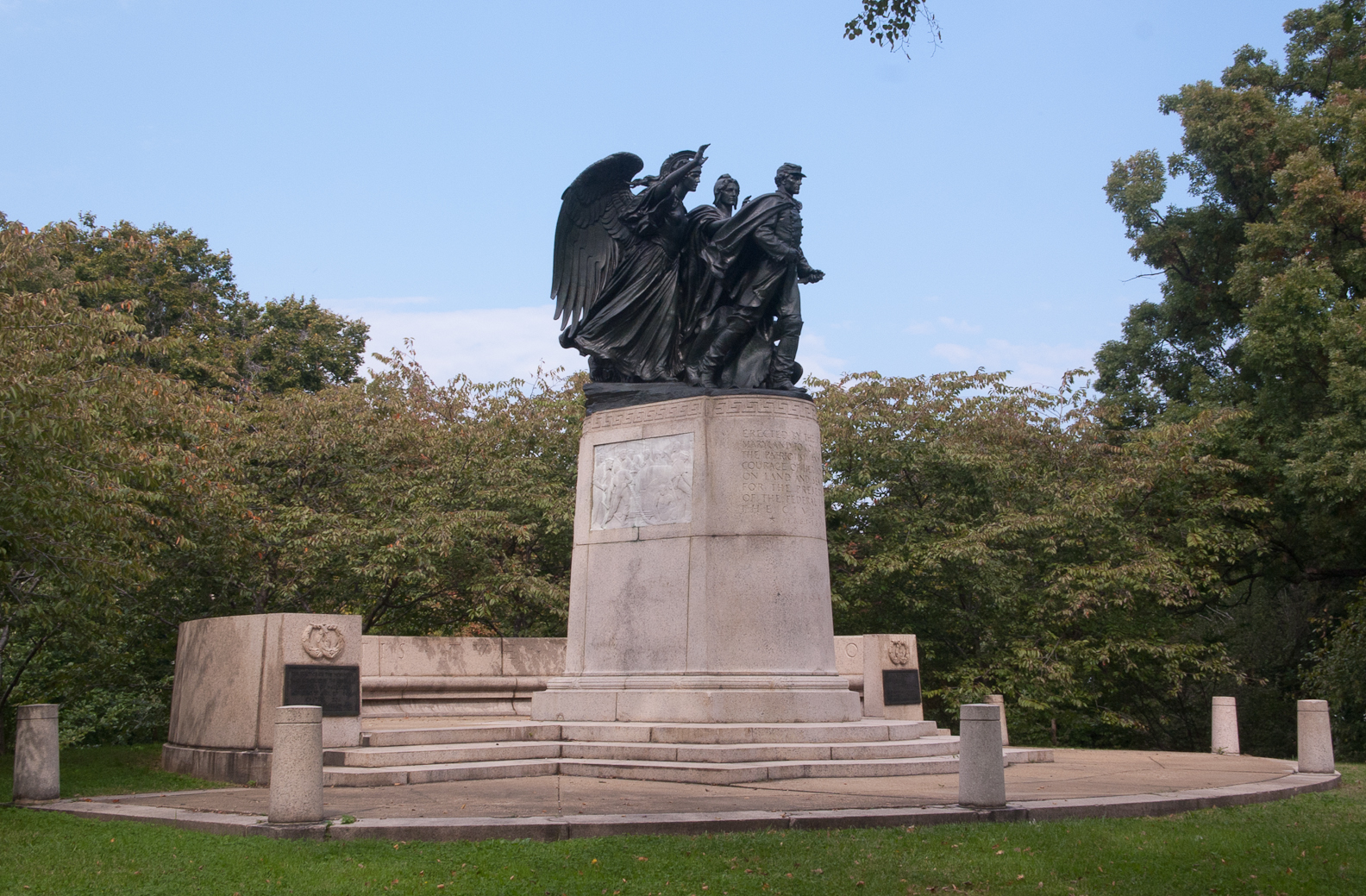
Union Soldiers and Sailors Monument in Baltimore, designed by Ross with sculpture by Adolph Alexander Weinman, dedicated in 1909.

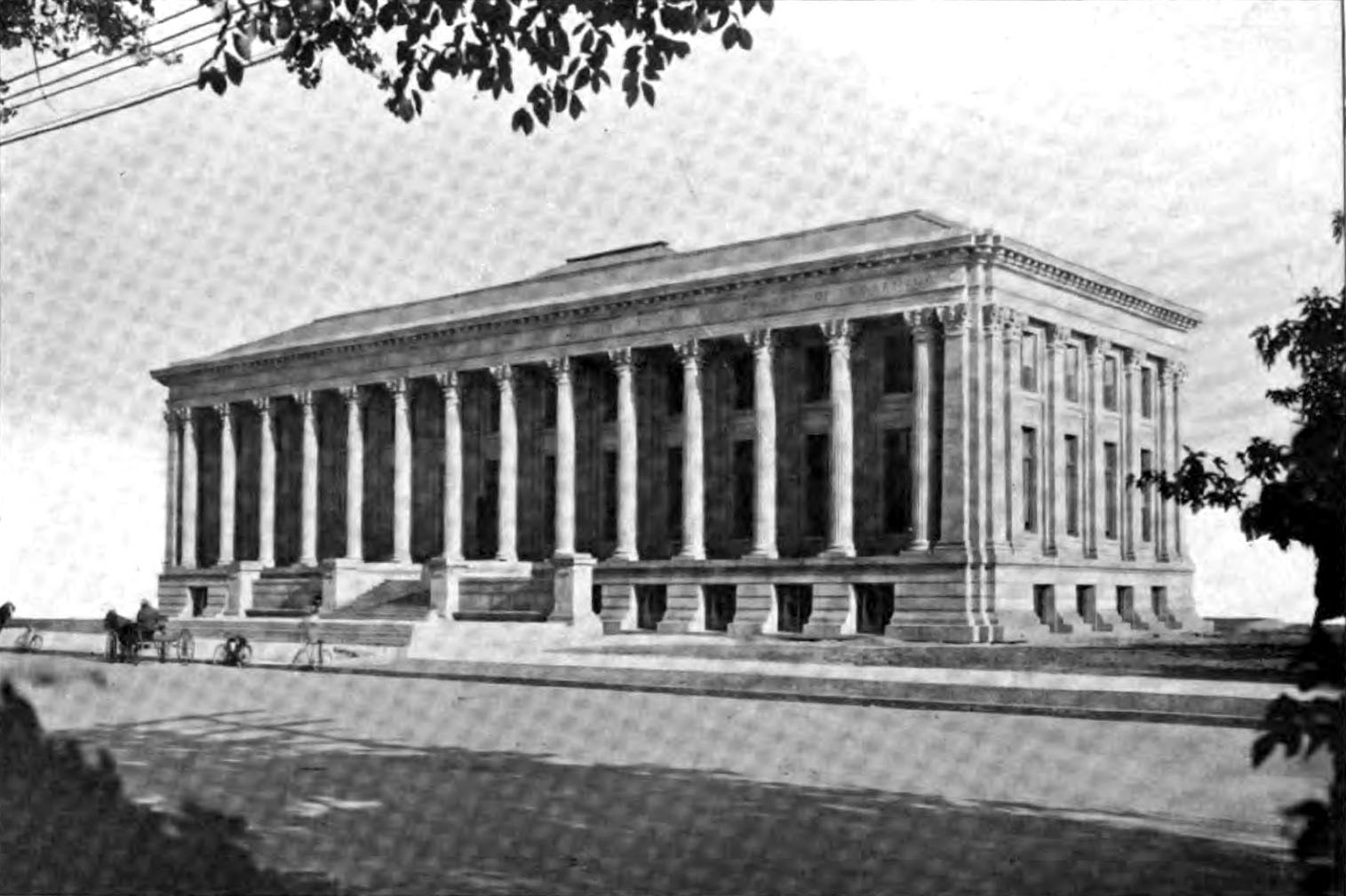
Denver Public Library, Denver, Colorado, completed in 1910.

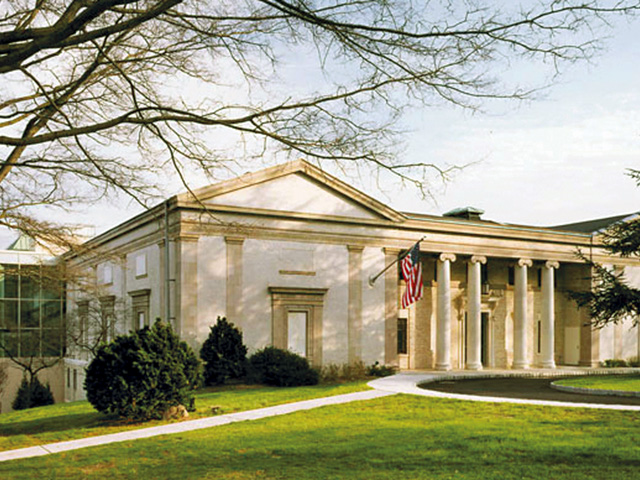
Montclair Art Museum, Montclair, New Jersey, completed in 1914.

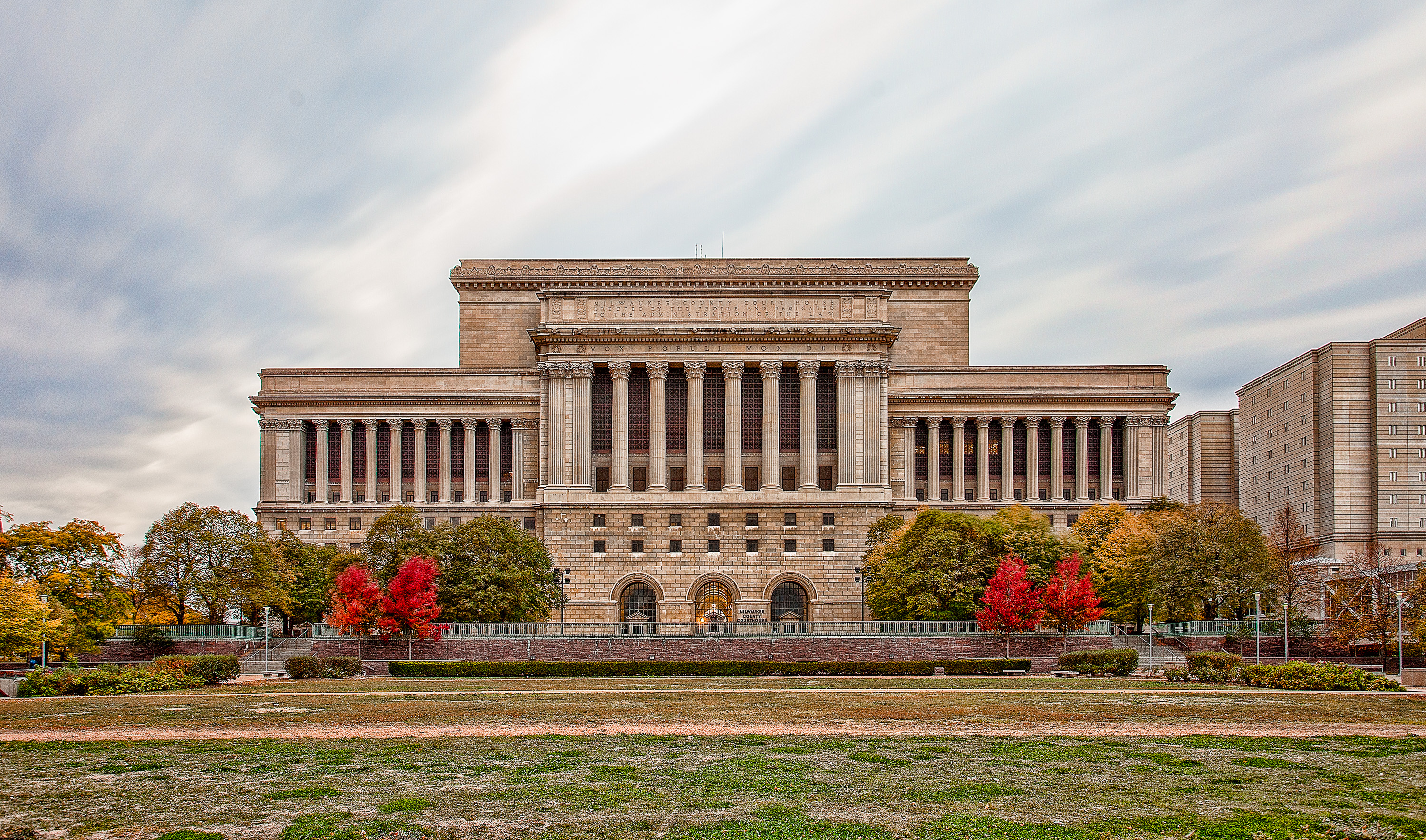
Milwaukee County Courthouse, Milwaukee, Wisconsin, completed in 1931.
