= Union Soldiers and Sailors Monument =

U.S. Civil War monument in Baltimore, Maryland, U.S.

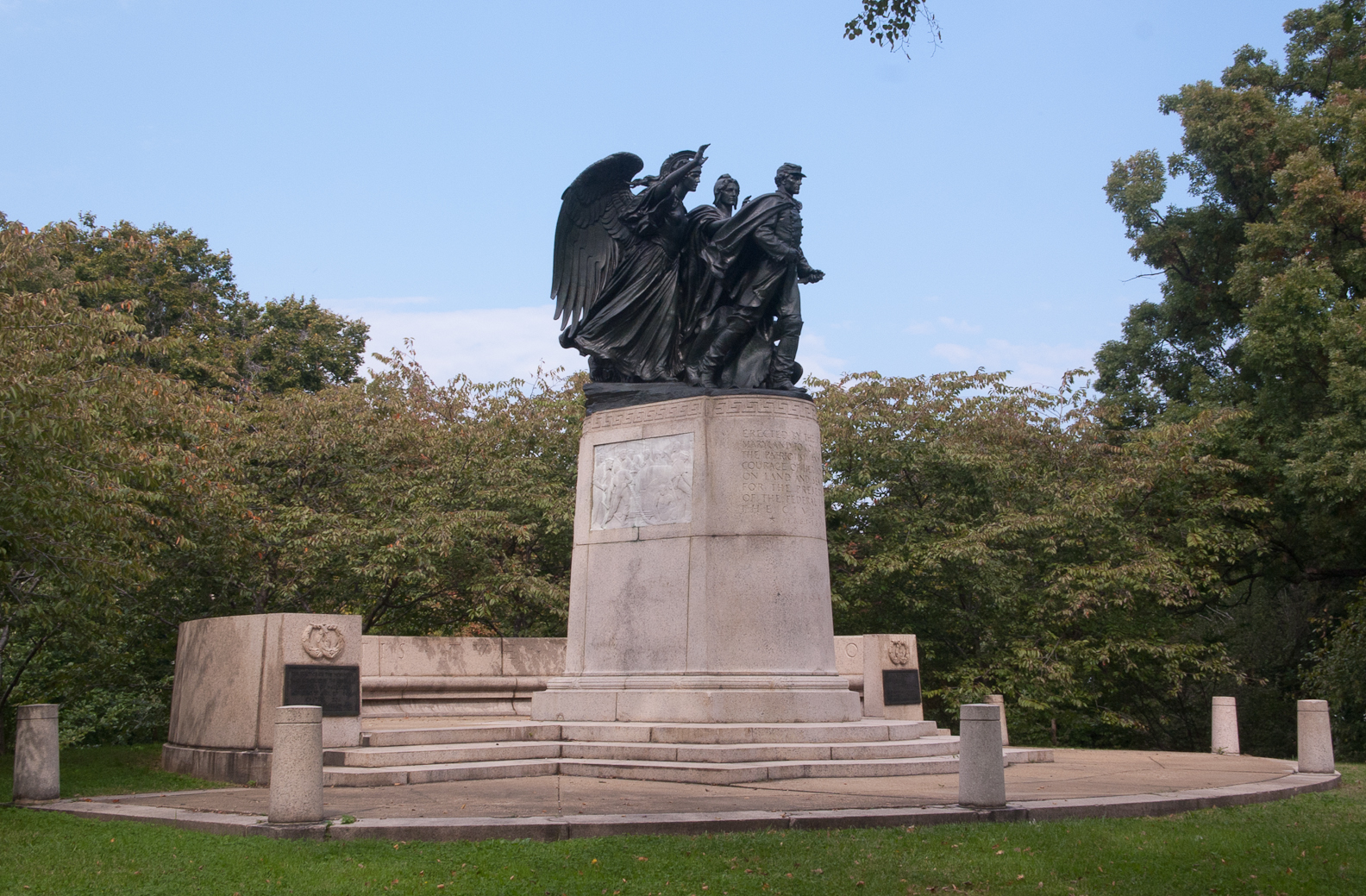
- Interactive map of Union Soldiers and Sailors Monument
- Location: Wyman Park, Baltimore, United States
- Coordinates: 39°19′25.8″N 76°37′4.4″W
- Designer: Adolph A. Weinman
- Material: Bronze, granite, marble
- Opening date: November 6, 1909
- Dedicated to: Union military
- IAS control number 75006034

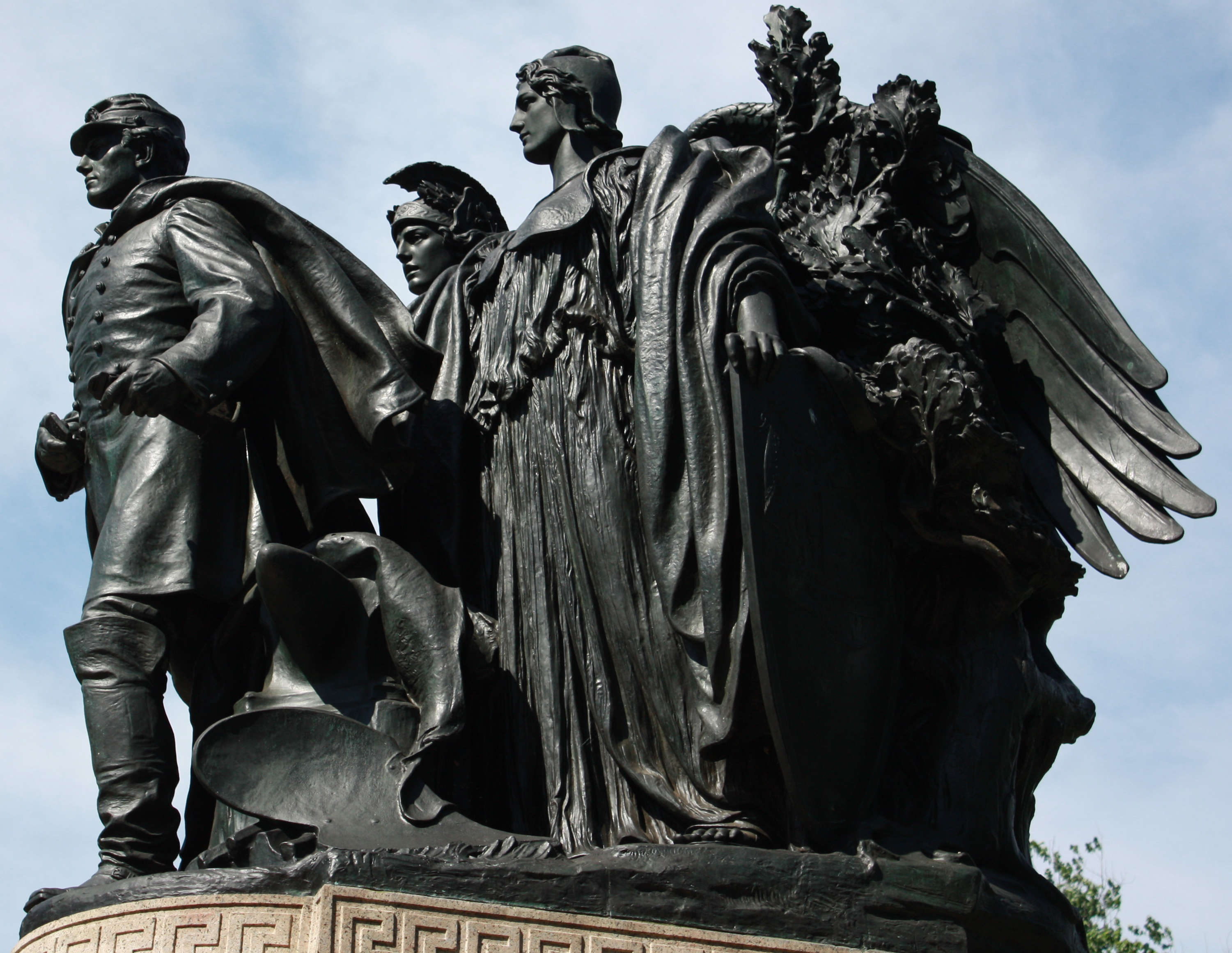
Closeup of the figures.

The Union Soldiers and Sailors Monument is a figural group sculpted by Adolph Alexander Weinman atop a pedestal designed by architect Albert Randolph Ross in Baltimore, United States, commemorating the Union military personnel of the American Civil War. The figural group shows Bellona and the personification of Victory together with a citizen-soldier turning from his plow and anvil as he dons a uniform and sword belt. Behind Bellona there is also a fig tree. The entire group stands on 12-foot high granite base, which has two relief panels. The monument's dimensions are approximately 10 ft.x102 in.x150 in. (sculpture) and 139x102x150 in. (base).

The monument is the only public Civil War monument honoring Union military personnel in Baltimore.

== History ==
The monument's erection was authorized by the General Assembly of Maryland on April 5, 1906. The monument was dedicated on November 6, 1909 and originally stood in Druid Hill Park before its relocation to Wyman Park in 1959 to accommodate the Jones Falls expressway. In October 1992 a survey to determine the monument's condition was conducted. On April 9, 1997 the monument was rededicated.

== Features ==
The monument's north panel has a marble relief depicting a cavalry and infantry charge and the opposite relief shows a naval attack. The back of the base features reliefs of a sword, an eagle, a shield, and an anchor. The base is surrounded by exedra bench with cannon posts around the edge. The exedra features a Latin inscription "Scvto bonae voluntatis tvae coronasti nos" ("You have crowned us with the shield of Your good will", which is taken from the seal of Maryland). The base's front bears an inscription: "Erected by the State of Maryland to commemorate the patriotism and heroic courage of her sons who on land and sea fought for the preservation of the federal Union in the Civil War 1861–1865".

== See also ==
- List of public art in Baltimore
