= Dykwynkyn =

Richard Wynn Keene (9 December 1809 – 28 November 1887) is mainly remembered today under his theatrical name of Dykwynkyn. Keene was a Victorian designer of costumes, props, mechanical effects and scenery for plays and pantomimes on the London stage, with a strong sense of wit and a special feeling for animals. He contributed some notable props for the first cycle of Wagner's Ring at Bayreuth. He was also an artist and, in his earlier career, a manufacturer and inventor of building materials. Keene's cement, a type of hard plaster for internal use, perpetuates his name. Keene achieved his theatrical distinction despite being severely deaf. Probably for that reason, he was never a public figure, and he died in penury.

== Early career ==
Keene was born in Birmingham, where his father, John Williams Keene, may have run a business connected with the arms trade. Drawings he made while visiting London in 1828 show that his artistic abilities and visual sense of humour were already well developed. By 1834, when he married Mary Garner Morgan, a widow, at St Mary's, Lambeth, he had settled in London and was already probably working in the cement industry, as he described himself as a cement merchant the following year, when he had an address off the Waterloo Road, while two years later he was working for a manufacturer at Nine Elms and looking for premises of his own. The trade was then developing rapidly along the south bank of the Thames, and Keene seems to have been interested in exploring the use of cement for modelling and sculpture.

In 1838, Keene and John Danforth Greenwood, giving their address as Belvedere Road, Lambeth, patented the invention now known as Keene's cement. This was a kind of hard plaster formed by heating a gypsum-based compound to over 170 °C. According to the patent application, it was to be used for ‘the purpose of producing Ornamental Surfaces’. Though the invention was soon taken up, the patentees seem to have made little money from it, and in 1843 Greenwood, a physician by training, emigrated to New Zealand.

Between about 1841 and 1851 Keene ran a business under his own name at Vauxhall Walk as a manufacturer of terracotta. This was still then an experimental trade, covering different processes and purposes. Keene seems to have avoided the developing market for terracotta drains, bricks or building materials, concentrating instead on mosaic-making and other artistic features. He supplied capitals for columns at the Reform Club for Sir Charles Barry, and exhibited samples of mosaic pavement made from terracotta and similar materials at the Great Exhibition in 1851.

== Work for the London stage ==
In 1852, Keene changed direction completely and began working as a designer of sets and costumes for the London stage, notably for the celebrated Drury Lane Christmas pantomimes. He had always been fascinated with the stage and with caricature. If, as seems likely, he was already severely deaf, this new career may have been easier for him to manage than an independent business. But Keene was not money-minded, and it is probable he took up the new work out of love for the theatre. For the rest of his life, he lived at modest addresses in Clapham, and at one point (1864), he was declared bankrupt.

Keene's stage sobriquet Dykwynkyn, a comic shortening of his name, is first recorded in connection with his costumes for the 1854 Drury Lane pantomime. That was how he was invariably known thereafter. Dykwynkyn's speciality was the large masks, or ‘Big Heads’, which were very popular with mid-Victorian pantomime audiences. Examples of his charming drawings for these and other fantasy devices are preserved in the Victoria & Albert Museum, at Harvard, and elsewhere. They were modelled in cramped back rooms at the back of Drury Lane Theatre, where Keene had a workshop. He also superintended the ‘juvenile fêtes’ held at the Crystal Palace in 1858–59, when a monster plum pudding ‘outdoing in its dimensions a Great-Western turntable’ was displayed, with creatures dancing upon it. Keene's range went well beyond comedy. He was involved in several ambitious archaeological reconstructions of scenery and costumes, such as the Egyptian drama Nitocris staged at Drury Lane in 1855, but they never brought him the success of the pantomimes. He also designed the monument in Kensal Green Cemetery to the pantomime clown Richard Flexmore (1862).

== ‘Fauna’ for The Ring ==
Keene left Drury Lane in the 1870s during the management of F. B. Chatterton and set up as a freelance stage designer and modeller with a workshop behind his own house at Milton Street, Wandsworth Road, Clapham (not Wandsworth, as has been persistently repeated). One episode stands out during this last stage of his career, when he was commissioned to supply mechanical animals for the first cycle of Richard Wagner's Ring at Bayreuth in 1876.

The background to this prestigious commission is peculiar. Wagner had strong ideas about stage effects in his operas, but often wavered between realism and suggestion. In this case, he appears to have disregarded the caution of Richard Fricke, his main adviser on staging the Ring, and insisted on a number of realistic mechanical props for scenes featuring mythical animals. Alfred Forman, Wagner's first English translator, though not one of his intimates, seconded by the Anglo-German conductor Edward Dannreuther, then urged the skills of Dykwynkyn as the craftsman best able to make the monstrous dragon into which Fafner is transformed in the second act of Siegfried. As far as is known, Wagner had never seen any of Dykwynkyn's creations on his visits to London. Yet Keene was commissioned, probably at short notice, to make not only the dragon but also a bear, a magpie and an ousel for Siegfried, a car with rams for Fricka in Die Walküre, and sacrificial beasts and a pair of ravens for Götterdämmerung. The snake into which Alberich is changed in Siegfried also came from England and was probably Dykwynkyn's too, but that is less certain.

By late July 1876, three weeks before the cycle began, only the car and parts of the dragon had arrived in Bayreuth, despite frequent visits by Dannreuther to Dykwynkyn's Clapham workshop. Most of the missing parts turned up just in time, but Fafner's neck joint arrived too late (a canard repeated by Ernest Newman claimed that it was sent to Beirut instead of Bayreuth). The German technicians had to sew on a clumsy and unconvincing temporary neck. This caused the first audience to be amused rather than awed by the dragon, and to cheer when Siegfried slew it and put it out of its misery, to Wagner's fury. In general, Dykwynkyn's creations for the Ring, clever and fantastic though they certainly were, were poorly received. Exotic pantomime props were unsuitable for Wagnerian mythic opera, as Richard Fricke had realized immediately the dragon arrived (‘Into the deepest junk room with the wretched thing! Get rid of it!’). Nothing was heard of the props after the opening cycle.

== Death ==
By the early 1880s, Keene's business had collapsed. He was probably already ill and certainly poor. In his final years, living at Hanbury Road, Battersea, close to his previous address, he was paralysed, bedridden, and relied on assistance from a theatrical charity. He died in the local workhouse infirmary on 28 November 1887 and was buried at the charity's expense at Brookwood Cemetery near Woking. According to an obituary in The Era, ‘through no fault of his own, his later life was saddened by great reverses of fortune, and he patiently endured to the last his many afflictions’. In these last years, he seems to have been cared for by a niece who was left ‘almost destitute’.
