= Taunton Public Library =

- U.S. National Register of Historic Places
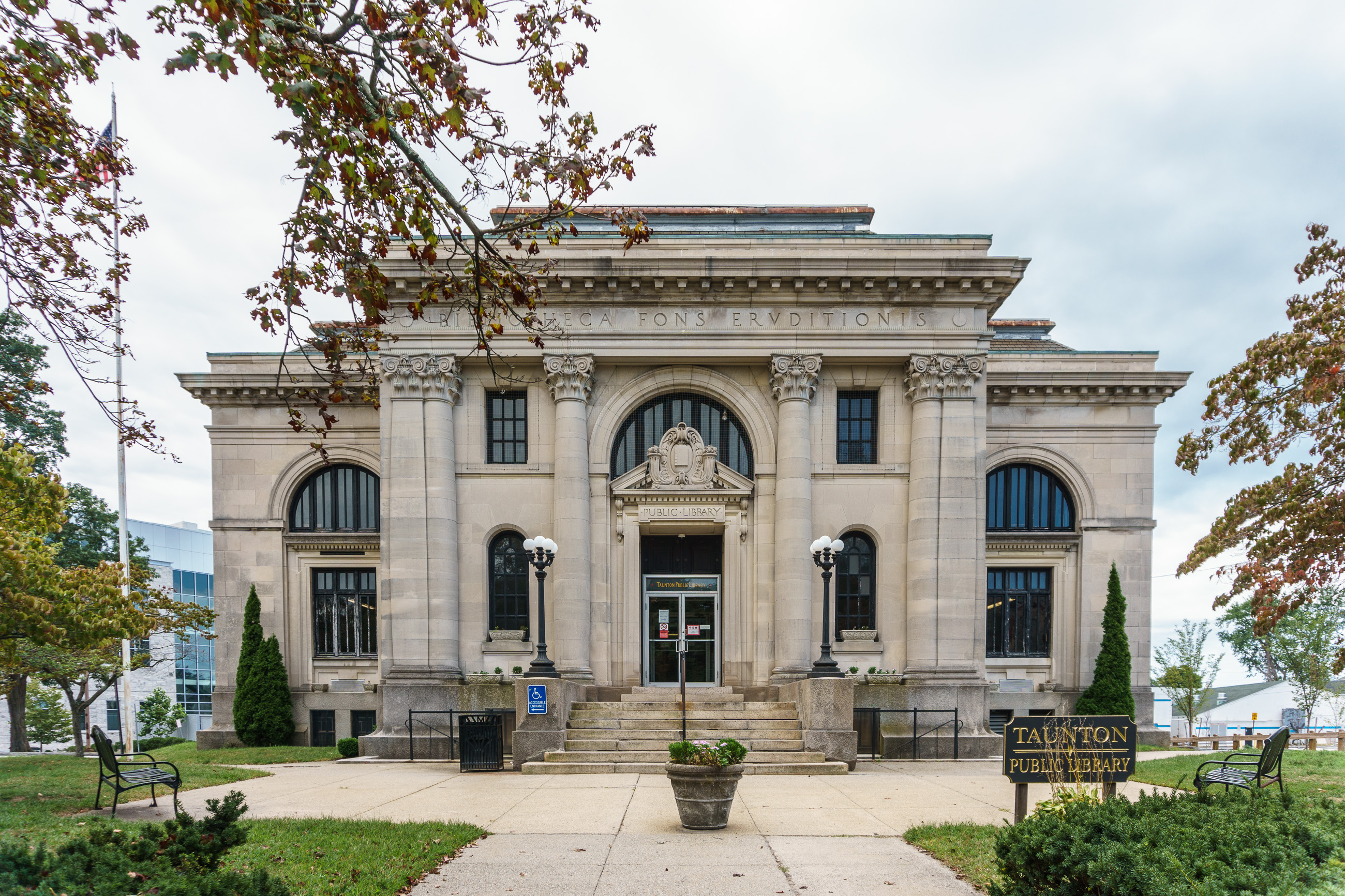
- Front view

- Location within Massachusetts Location within the United States
- Location: Taunton, Massachusetts
- Coordinates: 41°54′13″N 71°5′41″W
- Built: 1903
- Architect: Albert R. Ross
- Architectural style: Beaux Arts
- MPS: Taunton MRA
- NRHP reference No.: 84002225
- Added to NRHP: July 5, 1984

Taunton Public Library is the public library of Taunton, Massachusetts. It is located at 12 Pleasant Street, in an architecturally distinguished Beaux Arts building built in 1903 with funding support from Andrew Carnegie, to which a modern addition was made in 1979. The building is listed on the National Register of Historic Places as a particularly fine local example of Beaux Arts architecture.

== Architecture and history ==
The Taunton Public Library is set on the south side of Pleasant Street, a short east–west road in the center of Taunton. It is set among a number of other civic and institutional buildings. The oldest portion of the building is a T-shaped masonry structure built out of Indiana limestone in 1903 to a Beaux Arts and Classical Revival design by Albert R. Ross. The leg of the T projects forward, creating a section three bays wide and one deep, with the main entrance at its center. The entrance is recessed within a round-arch opening, topped by a broken pediment and cartouche. The bays of the projecting section are divided by full-height Corinthian engaged columns, with Corinthian pilasters near the coroners. These support a multi-layer entablature, above which a dentillated cornice encircles the building below its truncated hip roof. Differing window sizes and shapes give variety to the structure. In 1979, a large addition brick-faced addition was added to the rear of the original building.

The 1903 building's construction was made possible by a gift of $70,000 from industrialist and philanthropist Andrew Carnegie. It was added to the National Register of Historic Places in 1984.

== Gallery ==
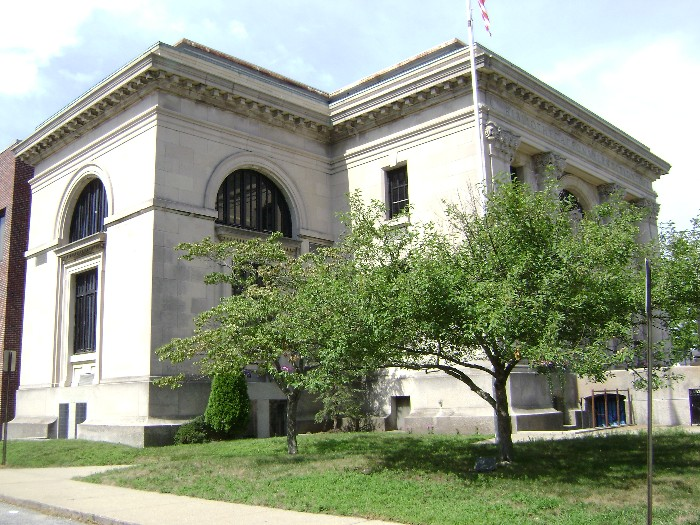
Southeast corner view

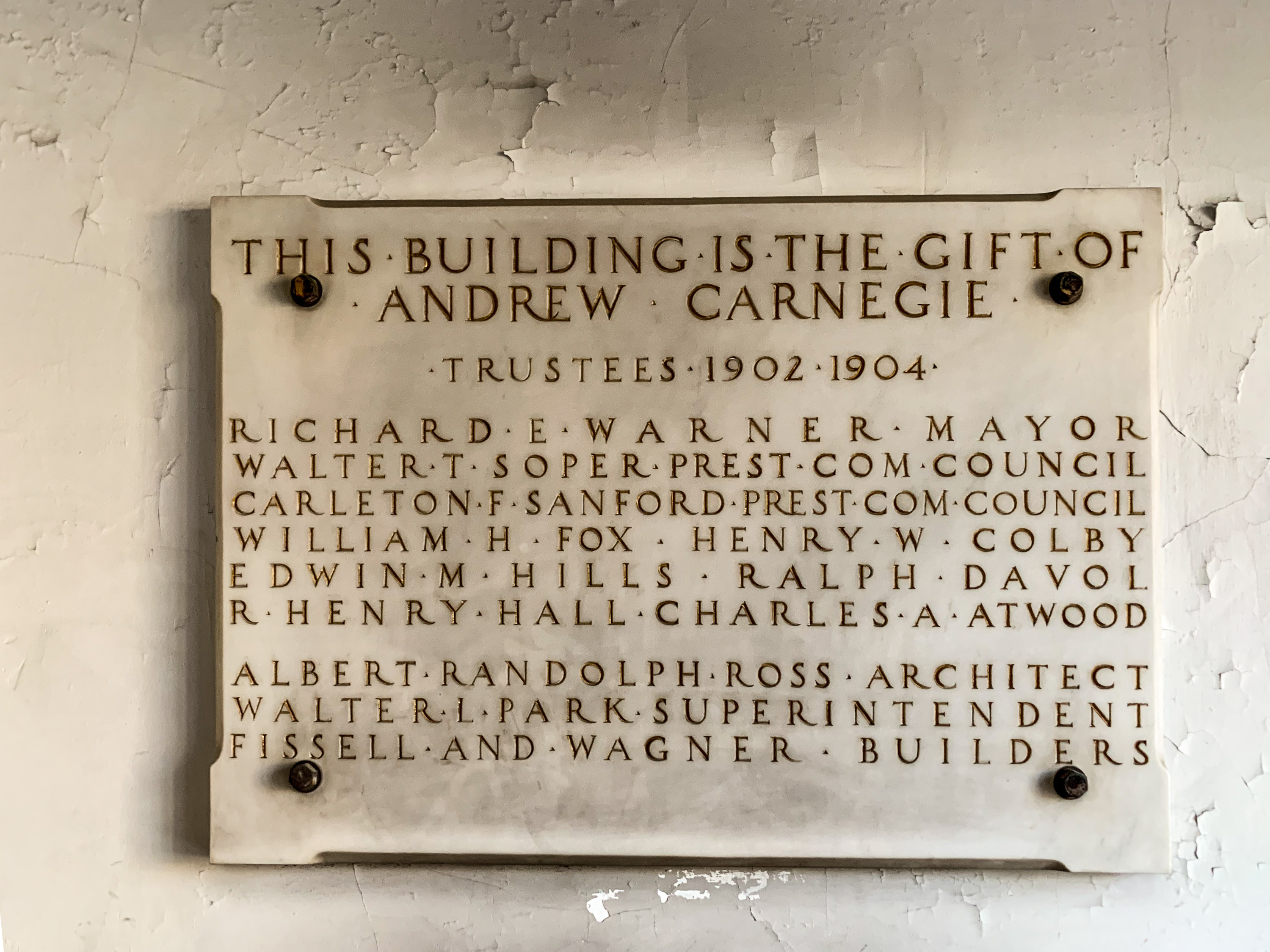
Plaque on the library wall

== See also ==
- National Register of Historic Places listings in Taunton, Massachusetts
- List of Carnegie libraries in Massachusetts
