= Carnegie Library Center =

Building in Atlantic City, Georgia, US

Coordinates: 39.359391°N 74.430753°W

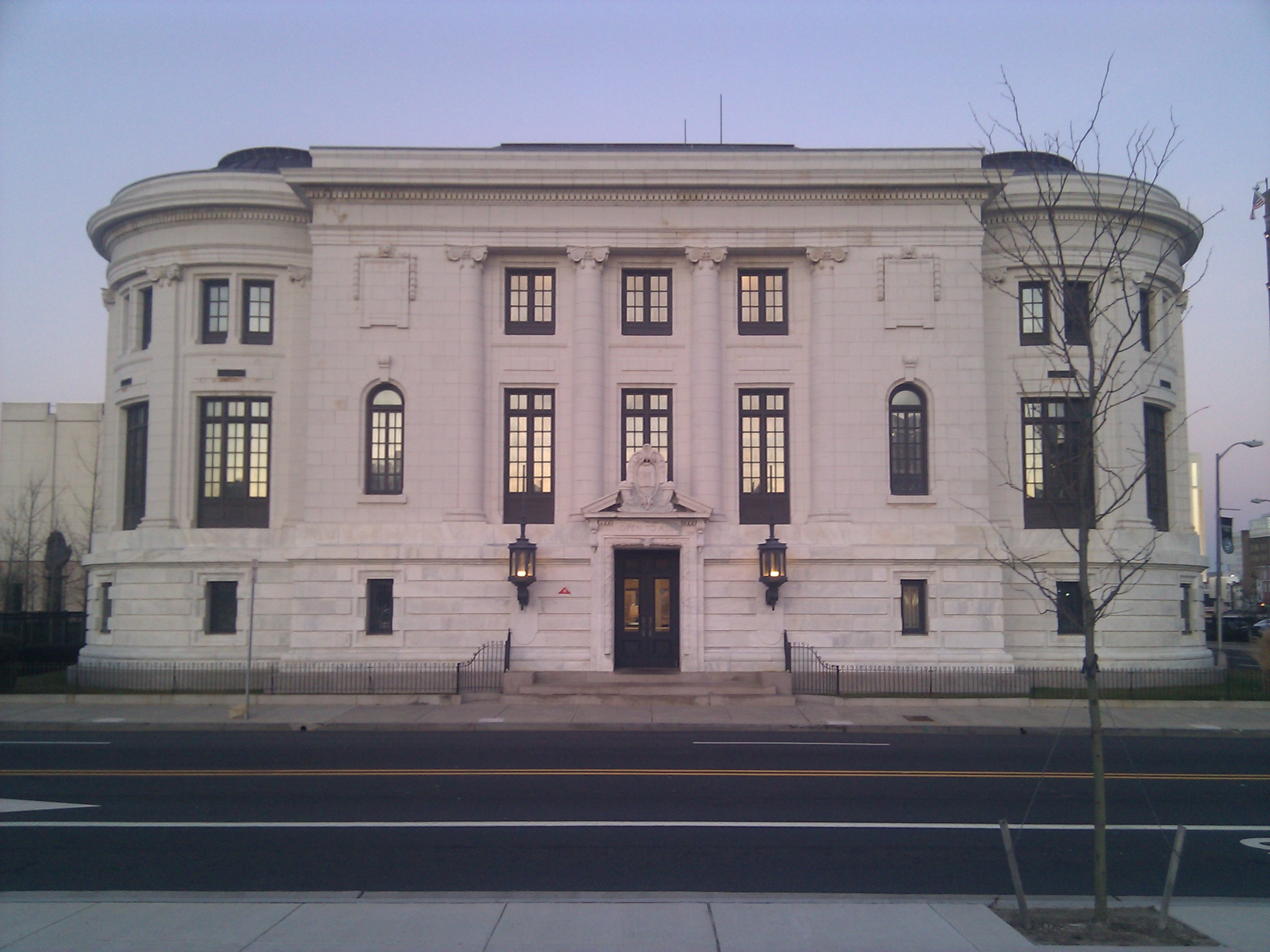
The Carnegie Center is housed in the 1903 Carnegie library of Atlantic City.

The Carnegie Center is a former public library in Atlantic City. The historic building is at the corner of Pacific Avenue and Martin Luther King Boulevard, one block west of the Boardwalk. It served for a period as an instructional site of Stockton University.

== Architecture and history ==
The public library was founded in 1903 with overwhelming support of residents, who voted (6,062 for to 30 against) to create it. It was originally named the Atlantic City Free Public Library. It was one of thirty-six Carnegie libraries built in New Jersey with matching grants by Andrew Carnegie. His Carnegie Corporation granted $71,075 to the city on January 22, 1903, for construction. Work on a $50,000 contract began in September 1903 and was completed in 1904. The library was developed by architect Albert Randolph Ross, who also designed the library now used for the Historical Society of Washington, D.C. and the Orange Public Library. With the words "Open to All" engraved above its main entrance, the building was dedicated on January 2, 1905. Carnegie wrote, “I trust the Library will fulfill its mission in the highest degree, becoming the center of light to all people.” Ross used a symmetrical classical style design include central stacks open to the public, natural light in public areas, separate public spaces with specialized materials (rather than one large reading room). The building had art gallery, museum, and meeting rooms to promote education through different media as well as books.

While the building received some renovations, the exterior remained intact and the interior was only slightly altered. The three-story, 9,000-square-foot structure features a marble, granite, terra cotta exterior, terrazzo floors, Scagliola-finished columns, and marble and iron staircases. It was used by the Atlantic City Public Library until 1985, when it relocated to a larger building completed in 1985 at Tennessee and Atlantic avenues.

The Carnegie Library was used by miscellaneous municipal offices until finally abandoned in 1994, no longer able to meet contemporary needs without substantial upgrades. The building stood vacant for nearly seven years.

== Re-opening as Carnegie Center ==
The collaborative efforts of the Casino Reinvestment Development Authority (CRDA), the City of Atlantic City, and Stockton University enabled the preservation and renovation of the historic building. The redevelopment project was planned to create a satellite site for the college's classes in the city, as well as for continuing and professional education, and community uses. Stockton College is located in nearby Pomona, and has developed other facilities in Atlantic City to make its offerings accessible to more people.

Starting in 2001, the building received renovations of more than $5 million after which it was used by the university. In fall 2018 Stockton opened its Atlantic City campus and phased out use of the Carnegie Center. In 2022, under the agreement with the CRDA and the city of Atlantic City, the building was returned to the City of Atlantic City.

The building includes a 75-seat lecture hall, multi-purpose room seating forty, state-of-the-art computer laboratory, a 15-seat executive conference room, and three seminar rooms, each with 25-person capacity. It is equipped with the modern communications technology, including wall-mounted displays, high-speed wireless Internet access, document cameras and VCRs.

The Civil Rights Garden, a tribute to the Civil Rights Movement, was developed adjacent to the Carnegie. It is used in support of public lectures, receptions, and other events.

== See also ==
- List of Carnegie libraries in New Jersey
- Cooper Library in Johnson Park
- Atlantic City Armory
- National Register of Historic Places listings in Atlantic County, New Jersey
- List of tallest buildings in Atlantic City
