= Cooper Library in Johnson Park =

- U.S. National Register of Historic Places
- New Jersey Register of Historic Places
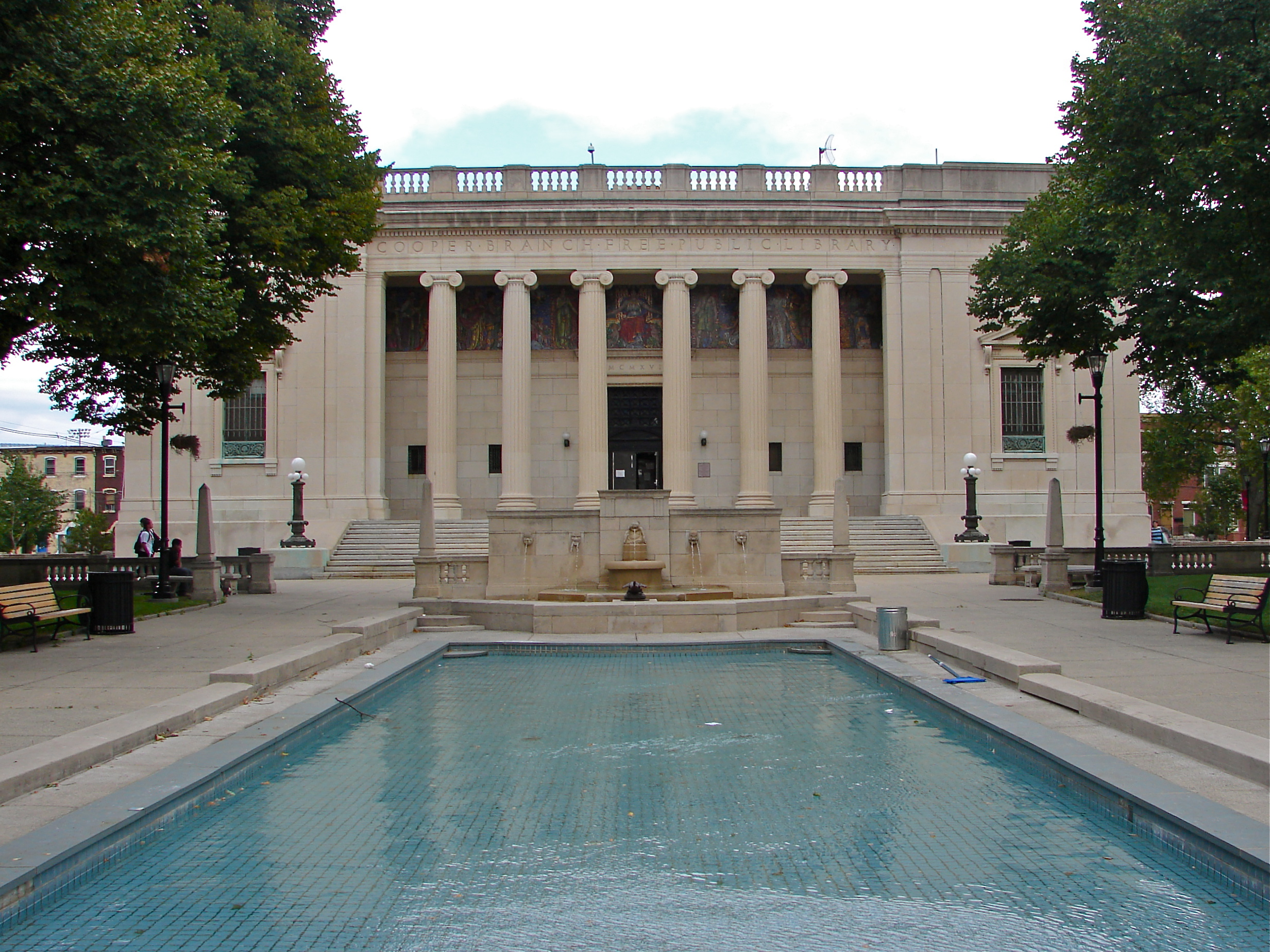

- Location within Camden County, New Jersey Location within New Jersey Location within the United States
- Location: 2nd and Cooper Streets, Camden, New Jersey
- Coordinates: 39°56′53″N 75°7′31″W
- Area: 2.5 acres (1.0 ha)
- Built: 1916
- Architect: Walter Karcher; Livingston Smith
- Architectural style: Classical Revival
- NRHP reference No.: 80002473
- NJRHP No.: 901

Significant dates
- Added to NRHP: March 11, 1980
- Designated NJRHP: October 26, 1979

Cooper Library in Johnson Park is located in the Cooper Grant section of Camden, Camden County, New Jersey, United States. It was built in 1916 and was added to the National Register of Historic Places on March 11, 1980, for its significance in architecture, art, education, and sculpture. It is part of Rutgers University–Camden.

== History and description ==
The mosaic frieze entitled America Receiving the Gifts of Nations which adorns the front of the building was designed by D'Ascenzo Studios of Philadelphia.

Johnson's park encompasses the Cooper Library, formally known as the Walt Whitman Cultural Arts Center, and marks the site of the Cooper's Ferry company. Cooper's Ferry was licensed in 1688 and helped in transporting products between Camden and Philadelphia. The area was a major point of transportation for the British and the Hessians during the American Revolutionary War, due to their capture of Philadelphia in September 1777. Later it would serve as a terminal for stage coaches and a rail road terminal from 1834 to 1854 for the Camden and Amboy Railroad Company.

Construction of the library began in 1916 and was completed in April 1918. The park was donated in December 1921 by Eldridge R. Johnson, founder of the Victor Talking Machine Company, after whom it is named. A fountain and several bronze statues were added between 1923 and 1930.

After its closure the Cooper Library became the Walt Whitman Cultural Arts Center, where theatrical performances were held. It was deeded to Rutgers University for a dollar and became known as the Center for Performing Arts in Camden. Rutgers University–Camden converted the center into a classroom and has allowed performances to be held at the Gordon Theater instead. Currently the building serves as a Digital Studies Center and Writing and Design Lab.

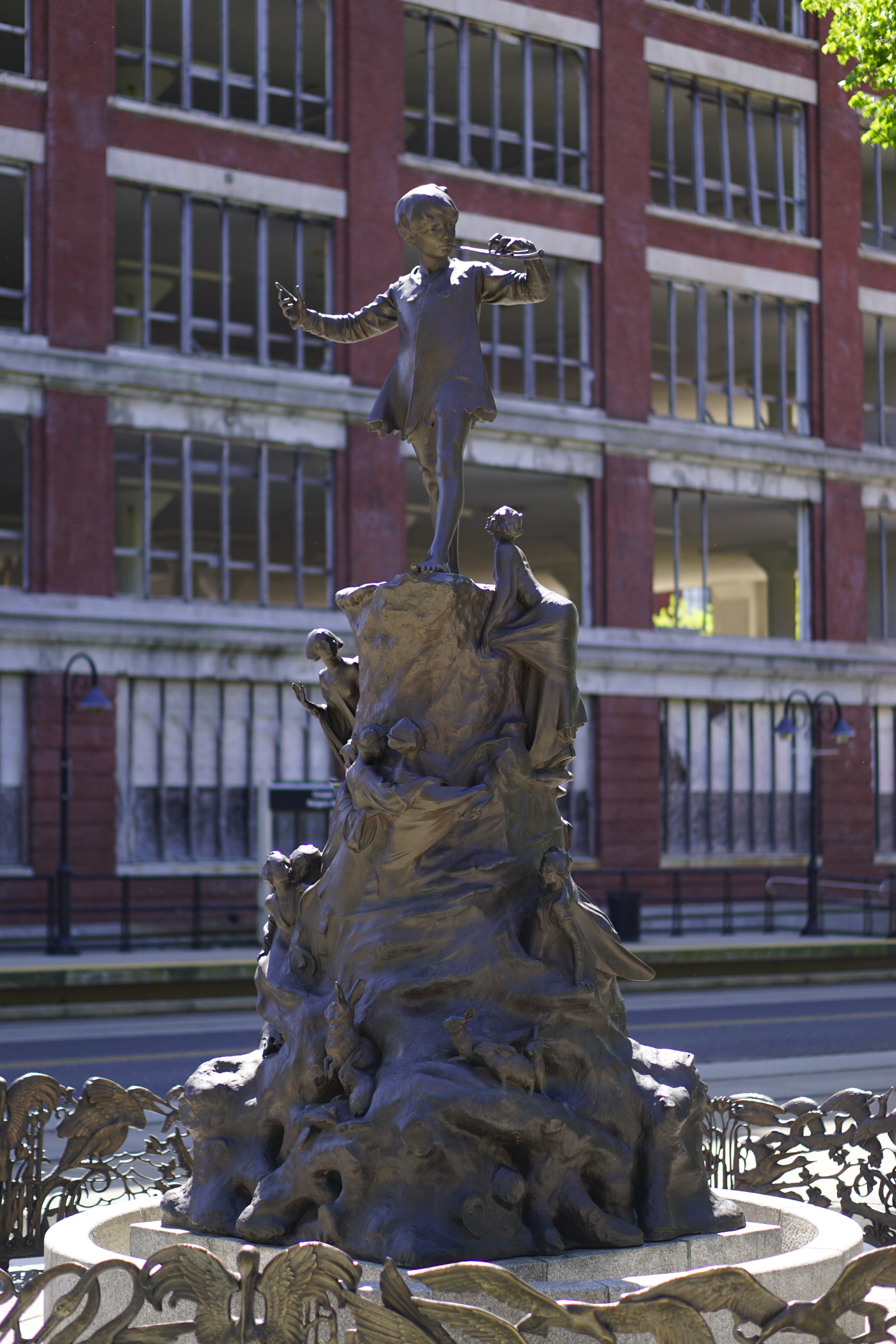
The Peter Pan statue by George Frampton, donated by Eldridge Johnson, is one of five in the world

== See also ==
- Carnegie Library Center
- National Register of Historic Places listings in Camden County, New Jersey
- List of Carnegie libraries in New Jersey
