= Milwaukee County Courthouse =

Historic courthouse in Wisconsin, United States

Coordinates: 43.041602°N 87.923677°W

- U.S. National Register of Historic Places
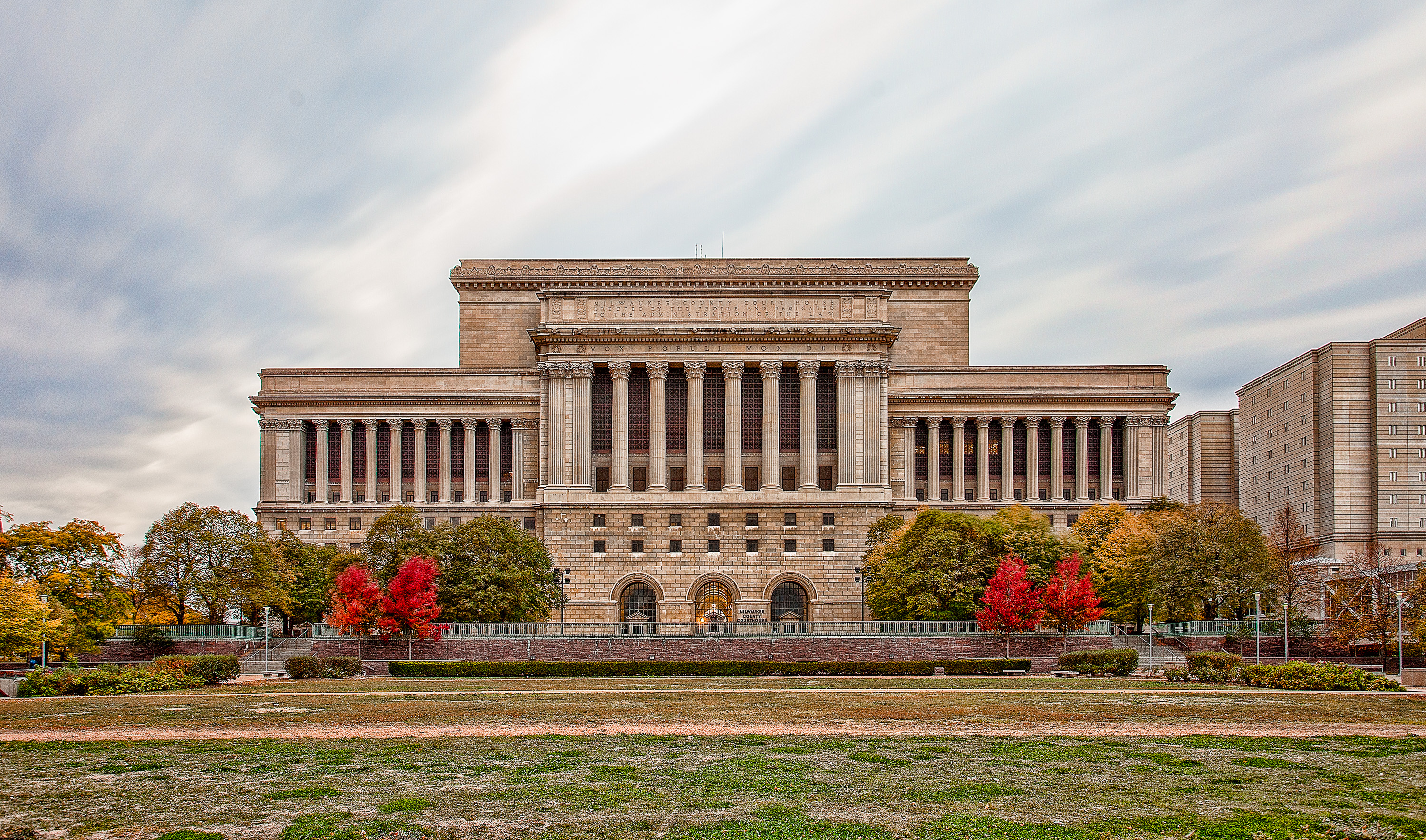
- Milwaukee County Courthouse from MacArthur Square

- Location within Wisconsin Location within the United States
- Interactive map showing the location of Milwaukee County Courthouse
- Location: 901 North 9th Street; Milwaukee, Wisconsin
- Architect: Albert Randolph Ross
- Architectural style: Classical Revival
- MPS: County Courthouses of Wisconsin TR
- NRHP reference No.: 82000687
- Added to NRHP: March 9, 1982

The Milwaukee County Courthouse is a high-rise municipal building located in downtown Milwaukee, Wisconsin. Completed in 1931, it is the third county courthouse to be built in the city and is listed on the National Register of Historic Places. The first two courthouses were built at what is now Cathedral Square Park on the east side of the Milwaukee River.

== Description ==
Situated on the crown of a hill, the eleven-story courthouse is 174 feet (54m) tall. The neoclassical style building was designed by New York architect Albert Randolph Ross, with the New York firm of McKim, Mead & White, chosen by a jury over 32 other architects from across the nation in a 1927 design competition. The building was clad in Bedford limestone and embellished with Beaux-Arts influenced details and sculpture such as owls and lion heads. The masonry work was provided by Andres Stone and Marble Company, owner Edgar Andres, whose family also helped construct the library and a local bank which is now the home for the Milwaukee Historical Society.

The NRHP nomination states, "the most monumental of all Neoclassical courthouses in the state, the Milwaukee County Courthouse is perhaps the apogee of the Neoclassical movement in twentieth century civic architecture in Wisconsin." While heralded as one of the grandest courthouses in the United States, it was once called a "million dollar rockpile" by the architect Frank Lloyd Wright.

== Civic space ==
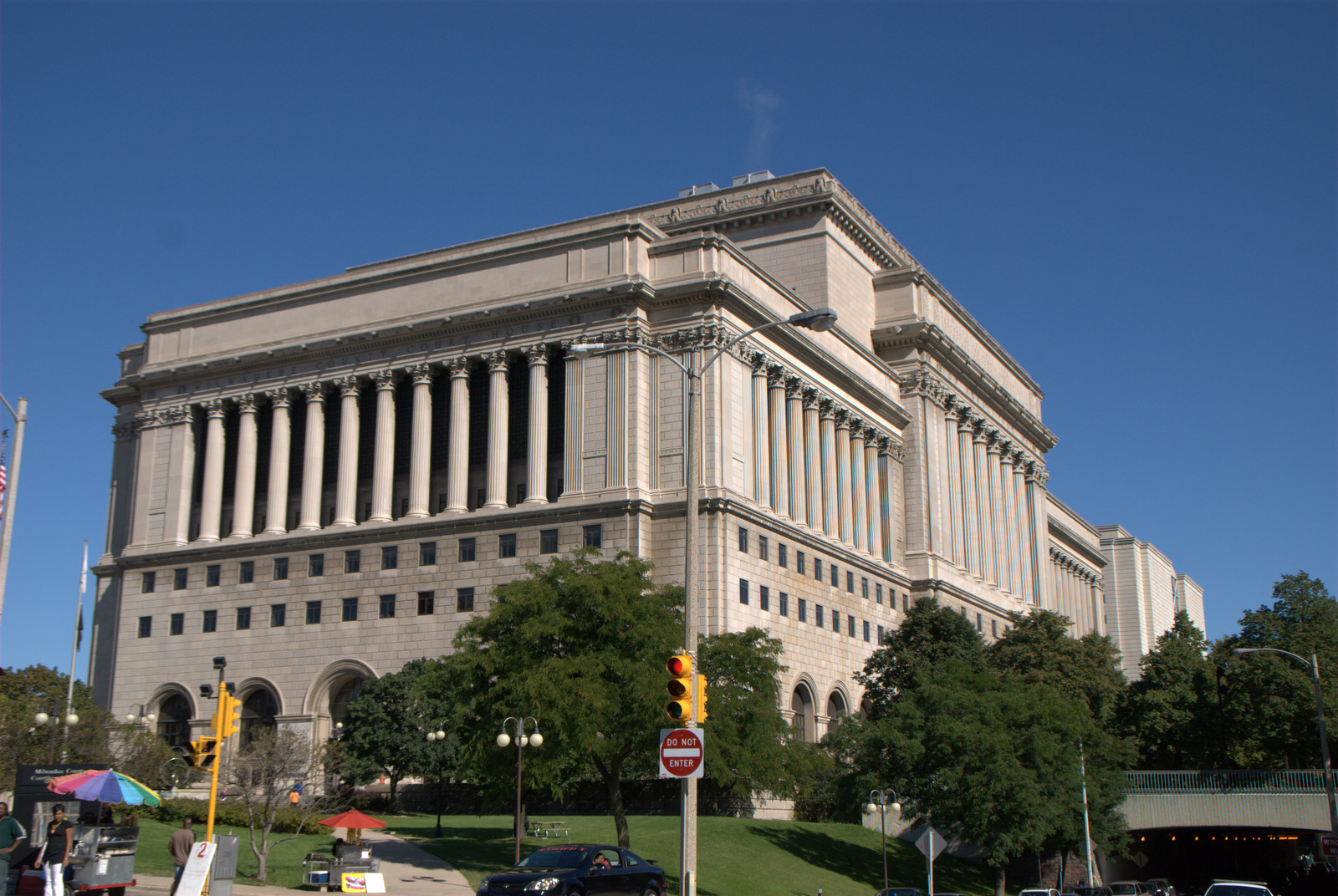
Clas Park is located on the courthouse's south lawn.

The Milwaukee County Courthouse is part of a greater civic space that includes not only the immediate area, but also the neighboring Milwaukee Public Museum, Central Library, and a swath of government buildings running east along Wells Street to the Milwaukee City Hall.

Along the east side of the County Courthouse is a terraced commons area called MacArthur Square. It was dedicated on September 17, 1945, to General Douglas MacArthur, who attended West Division High School - now Milwaukee High School of the Arts. A parking garage was built underneath in 1967, which cuts in to the side of the hill. At the base of the building is the India-America Friendship Park and a statue in memory of Mahatma Gandhi. North 9th Street continues through as a tunnel between the building and parking structure.

The MacArthur Square area has been criticized for its uninspired architecture and for noise pollution from the high capacity ventilation of the parking levels beneath it, which overpowers the water feature that was supposed to drown it out.

Just to the north is the Milwaukee County Safety Building and Jail buildings. On the southern side of the courthouse is Clas Park, named for local architect and city planner Alfred Clas. The Kilbourn Tunnel, a connecting corridor to and from northbound I-43 at the Courthouse Annex on the west side of the building to Kilbourn Avenue (named for the founder of the Kilbourntown portion of Milwaukee, Byron Kilbourn), runs underneath the courthouse and surrounding civic area.

== Courthouse Annex ==
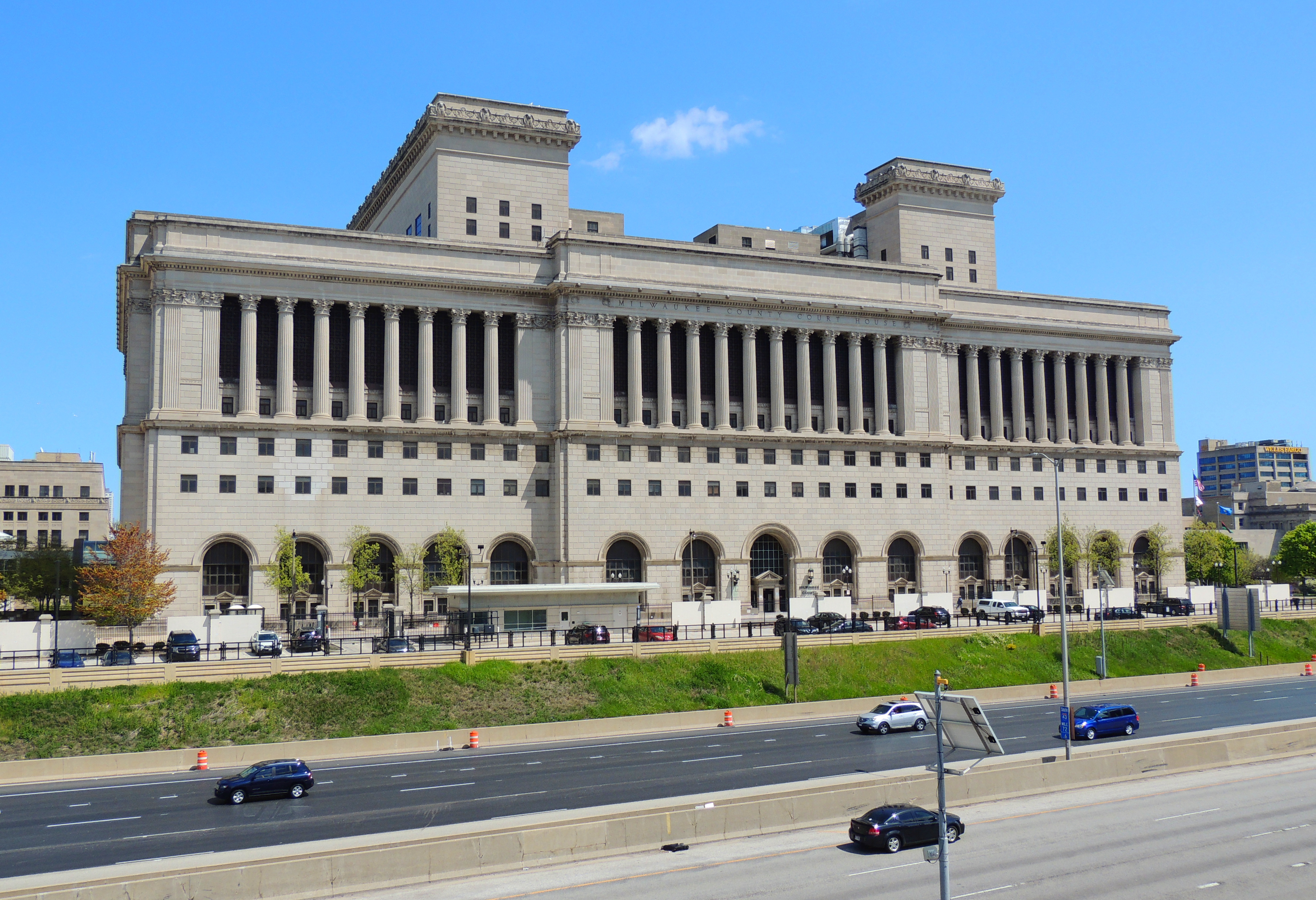
The Milwaukee County Courthouse from across I-43, where the former annex was located.

The Milwaukee County Courthouse Annex was a five-story 447-space concrete parking facility that also housed limited office space. Built in the 1960s, it extended over the three northbound lanes of Interstate 43 (I-43) just north of the Marquette Interchange. On the north façade was a four-story, 76-by-37-foot (23 m × 11 m) mural titled "Whale Commuters". It was donated by artist Robert Wyland, who is known for painting large outdoor murals of whales called Whaling Walls, and dedicated on September 15, 1997.

Following some political controversy between then-Milwaukee County Executive Scott Walker and the Board of Supervisors, along with an unsuccessful offer by the Wisconsin Film Office to allow an implosion of the structure for any production interested in filming it for a demolition scene, the Annex was demolished as part of the interchange reconstruction. The last section came down on May 23, 2006, after a permit was obtained from the Federal Government to proceed in spite of some nesting seagulls and their eggs.

Upon learning of the impending destruction of his mural, Wyland threatened legal action, citing the Visual Artists Rights Act which gives artists the right to protect their work. According to the contract he signed these rights were waived and Milwaukee County "reserves the right to remodel or demolish the building and/or remove the mural at any time." Since then, Wyland has offered to paint the Wells Street side of the Milwaukee Public Museum, the building he had originally wanted to do. However, as was the original problem, the museum has refused the offer due to the lack of any connection between Milwaukee and the ocean and therefore whales as well.

A small section of the Whaling Wall containing an adult and baby dolphin was removed on May 2, 2006, prior to demolition. The dolphin section and a piece with the "Wyland" signature were installed at the northern portal of the Kilbourn Tunnel at I-43 northbound in February 2007, near the location of the former mural.

== See also ==
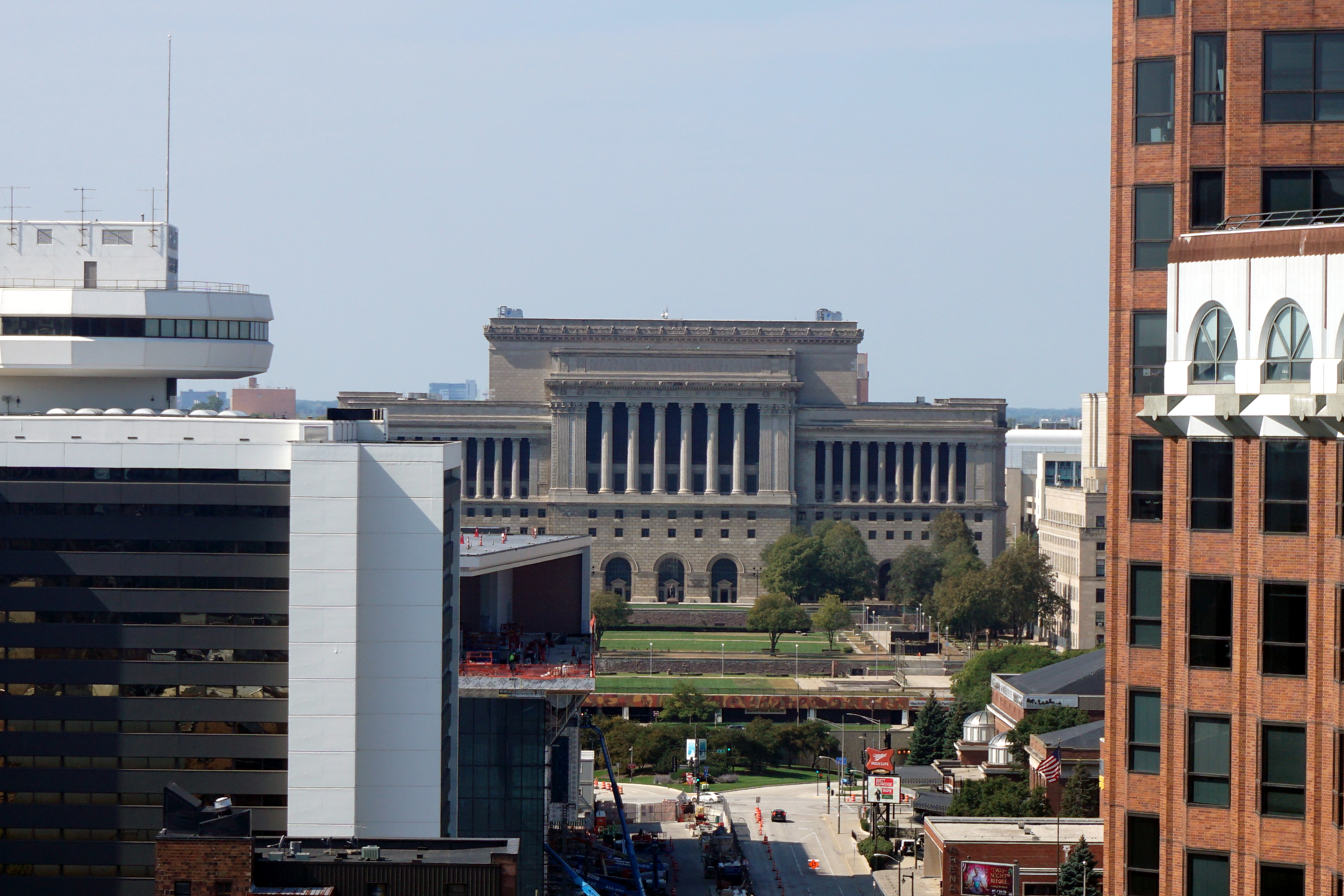
Milwaukee County Courthouse viewed from Milwaukee City Hall

- MacArthur sculpture
- Gandhi sculpture
- The Spirit of Polonia sculpture
- National Register of Historic Places in Milwaukee
