= Keene's cement plaster =

Plaster formulation

Keene's cement plaster or Keene's cement is a hard plaster formulation, primarily used for ornamental work. Alternative names are Martin's cement and Parian cement. It is a calcined formulation of regular calcium sulfate plaster with an alum admixture. The compound gives a hard finish that can be polished. The product was developed by Richard Wynn Keene and patented in 1838.
