= List of works by Julia Morgan =

List of buildings and structures by Julia Morgan

Julia Morgan graduated as the first woman to earn a degree from the École nationale supérieure des beaux-arts in Paris and then became the first women to be licensed as an architect in California. With these credentials, she completed over 700 projects in her career which expressed a distinctly Californian architecture.

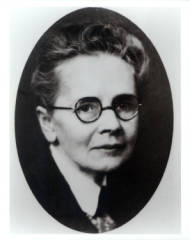
Julia Morgan in 1926

Some of her early commissions involved rebuilding after the 1906 San Francisco earthquake based on her engineering expertise in utilizing reinforced concrete. Later in her career, both the Hearst publishing family and the Young Women's Christian Association (YWCA) employed Morgan as their primary architect. She also designed a number of women's clubs and private homes.

Morgan did not follow a consistent school of architecture, often synthesizing various combinations of Arts & Crafts, Beaux-Arts, Gothic Revival, Mediterranean Revival, Neoclassical, and Spanish Colonial Revival styles. By the time she retired in 1951, her eclectic architecture had fallen out of style and was poorly regarded but the assessment of her legacy gradually improved over time. In 2014, Morgan became the first women to receive the American Institute of Architects' Gold Medal, 57 years after her death.

== List ==
Individually notable buildings and structures

Name	Image	Built	Location	City, State	Notes	Listing
Asilomar Conference Grounds		1913	800 Asilomar Boulevard; 36°37′08″N 121°56′16″W	Pacific Grove, California	Originally a YWCA retreat; now the Asilomar State Beach	NHLD
Berkeley Baptist Divinity School		1919	2606 Dwight Way; 37°51′55″N 122°15′22″W	Berkeley, California	Now Hobart Hall at Berkeley School of Theology; part of the Graduate Theological Union	BL
Berkeley Student Cooperative		1905	2732 Durant Avenue; 37°52′06″N 122°15′10″W	Berkeley, California	Morgan designed three family houses in 1905, 1911, and 1913; BSC later purchased and renamed them to provide student housing	
Berkeley Women's City Club		1929	2315 Durant Avenue; 37°52′03″N 122°15′46″W	Berkeley, California	Now the Berkeley City Club	NRHP
Miss Burke's School		1917	3065 Jackson Street; 37°47′28″N 122°26′44″W	San Francisco, California	Institution renamed to Katherine Delmar Burke School; building now part of the San Francisco University High School	
Margaret Carnegie Library		1904	Oval Circle; 37°46′45″N 122°10′54″W	Oakland, California	Part of Mills College	
Chapel of the Chimes		1909	4499 Piedmont Avenue; 37°49′55″N 122°14′45″W	Oakland, California	Built as California Electric Crematory in 1909; Morgan designed chapel addition in 1928	ODL
Chinatown YWCA		1932	965 Clay Street; 37°47′38″N 122°24′32″W	San Francisco, California	Now the Chinese Historical Society of America	SFDL
Emanu-el Residence Club		1922	300 Page Street; 37°46′26″N 122°25′34″W	San Francisco, California	Residence hall for Jewish-American women; now the San Francisco Zen Center	
Fairmont Hotel		1907	950 Mason Street; 37°47′33″N 122°24′36″W	San Francisco, California	Morgan engineered structural repairs after the 1906 San Francisco earthquake	NRHP
Foothill Study Club		1914	20399 Park Place; 37°15′33″N 122°01′48″W	Saratoga, California	Now the Saratoga Foothill Club	NRHP
Girton Hall		1911	200 Centennial Drive; 37°52′29″N 122°14′18″W	Berkeley, California	Now the Julia Morgan Hall at the University of California Botanical Garden	NRHP
Goethe House		1924	3731 T Street; 38°33′33″N 121°27′38″W	Sacramento, California	Now the Julia Morgan House at California State University, Sacramento	NRHP
Gum Moon		1912	940 Washington Street; 37°47′42″N 122°24′32″W	San Francisco, California	Women's Missionary Society of the Pacific Coast residence hall for women and children	
Hacienda del Pozo de Verona		1898	707 Country Club Circle; 37°38′14″N 121°53′42″W	Pleasanton, California vicinity	Originally designed by A. C. Schweinfurth with later additions by Morgan; demolished in 1969 to build Castlewood Country Club	
Hearst Castle		1919	750 Hearst Castle Road; 35°41′07″N 121°10′04″W	San Simeon, California vicinity	Expansions continued through 1947; also known as La Cuesta Encantada, San Simeon, and Xanadu; now a state park	NHL
Hearst Greek Theatre		1903	2001 Gayley Road; 37°52′25″N 122°15′15″W	Berkeley, California	Designed by John Galen Howard with assistance from Morgan; part of University of California, Berkeley	NRHP
Hearst Gymnasium for Women		1927	2589 Bancroft Parkway; 37°52′10″N 122°15′24″W	Berkeley, California	Designed with Bernard Maybeck; now the Hearst Memorial Gymnasium which also houses the Phoebe A. Hearst Museum of Anthropology	NRHP
Hearst Memorial Mining Building		1907	Hearst Mining Circle; 37°52′27″N 122°15′26″W	Berkeley, California	Designed by architect John Galen Howard with assistance from Morgan; part of the University of California, Berkeley	NRHP
Hollywood Studio Club		1925	1215 Lodi Place, 34°05′34″N 118°19′25″W	Los Angeles	YWCA residence for aspiring actresses	NRHP
Hostess House		1918	27 University Avenue; 37°26′35″N 122°09′56″W	Palo Alto, California	YWCA building relocated from Camp Fremont; now the MacArthur Park Restaurant	NRHP
Japanese YWCA		1932	1830 Sutter Street; 37°47′12″N 122°25′50″W	San Francisco, California	Now the Nihonmachi Little Friends	NRHP
KYA Transmitter		1937	34 Bayview Park Road; 37°42′59″N 122°23′41″W	San Francisco, California	Located in Bayview Park; station now named KSFB	
Ladies Protection and Relief Society Building		1925	3400 Laguna Street; 37°48′10″N 122°25′53″W	San Francisco, California	Now known as the Julia Morgan Building, part of the San Francisco Ladies Protection and Relief Society's Heritage on the Marina project	SFDL
Merchants Exchange		1904	465 California Street; 37°47′34″N 122°24′08″W	San Francisco, California	Willis Polk led repairs after the 1906 San Francisco earthquake while Morgan assisted by replacing damaged interiors	
Mills College		1904	5000 MacArthur Boulevard; 37°46′43″N 122°10′57″W	Oakland, California	Morgan designed the El Campanil (1904), Kapiolani Cottage Infirmary (1909), and the Student Union (1916); campus now part of Northeastern University	
Milpitas Hacienda		1930	101 Infantry Road; 36°00′38″N 121°14′34″W	Jolon, California vicinity	Alternatively known as the Milpitas Ranch House, Hacienda Guest Lodge, Milpitas Ranchhouse, and The Hacienda; now part of Fort Hunter Liggett	NRHP
Ming Quong Home for Chinese Girls		1924	Underwood Avenue; 37°47′01″N 122°11′15″W	Oakland, California	Later part of Mills College as Alderwood Hall, Geranium Cottage, Graduate House, and then Mills Conference Center; now the Julia Morgan School for Girls	
Neptune Pool		1936	750 Hearst Castle Road; 35°41′08″N 121°10′09″W	San Simeon, California vicinity	On the grounds of Hearst Castle	
North Star House		1905	12075 Old Auburn Road; 39°11′40″N 121°04′35″W	Grass Valley, California vicinity	Also known as Foote Mansion	NRHP
Occidental Board Presbyterian Mission House		1908	920 Sacramento Street; 37°47′36″N 122°24′31″W	San Francisco, California	Now the Donaldina Cameron House	SFDL
Ocean House		1929	415 Pacific Coast Highway; 34°01′28″N 118°30′48″W	Santa Monica, California	Home of Marion Davies, also known as the Beach House; demolished in 1956 and now the site of the Annenberg Community Beach House	
Potrero Hill Neighborhood House		1922	953 DeHaro Street; 37°45′30″N 122°24′03″W	San Francisco, California	Morgan also designed the 1930 kindergarten building; now known as The Nabe;	SFDL
St. John's Presbyterian Church		1910	2640 College Avenue; 37°51′44″N 122°15′14″W	Berkeley, California	Now the Julia Morgan Theater	NRHP
Sausalito Woman's Club		1918	120 Central Avenue; 37°51′07″N 122°28′51″W	Sausalito, California	Listed as Sausalito’s first municipal landmark in 1976	NRHP
Alfred E. Warren House		1922	341 Mansion Ave; 39°43′52″N 121°50′47″W	Chico, California	Now the President's Mansion at California State University, Chico	
Seldon Williams House		1928	2821 Claremont Boulevard; 37°51′36″N 122°14′43″W	Berkeley, California	Now the Julia Morgan House at the University of California;	
Wyntoon		1935	1 Wyntoon Road; 41°11′28″N 122°03′45″W	McCloud, California vicinity	Originally designed by Bernard Maybeck; Morgan added Cinderella, Bear and Sleeping Beauty houses in a Bavarian style	
YWCA Building		1922	1660 M Street; 36°44′35″N 119°47′39″W	Fresno, California	Now part of the Marjaree Mason Center	NRHP
YWCA Building		1915	1515 Webster Street; 37°48′17″N 122°16′06″W	Oakland, California	Now part of Envision Schools	NRHP
YWCA Building		1929	3425 Mission Inn Avenue; 33°58′54″N 117°22′14″W	Riverside, California	Now the Riverside Art Museum	NRHP
YWCA Building		1927	1040 Richards Street; 21°18′28″N 157°51′35″W	Honolulu, Hawaii	Also known as Laniākea;	CP

=== Key ===
National Historic Landmark
National Historic Landmark District
NRHP-listed
Contributing property in a NRHP-listed historic district
Local heritage register

== Gallery of other works ==
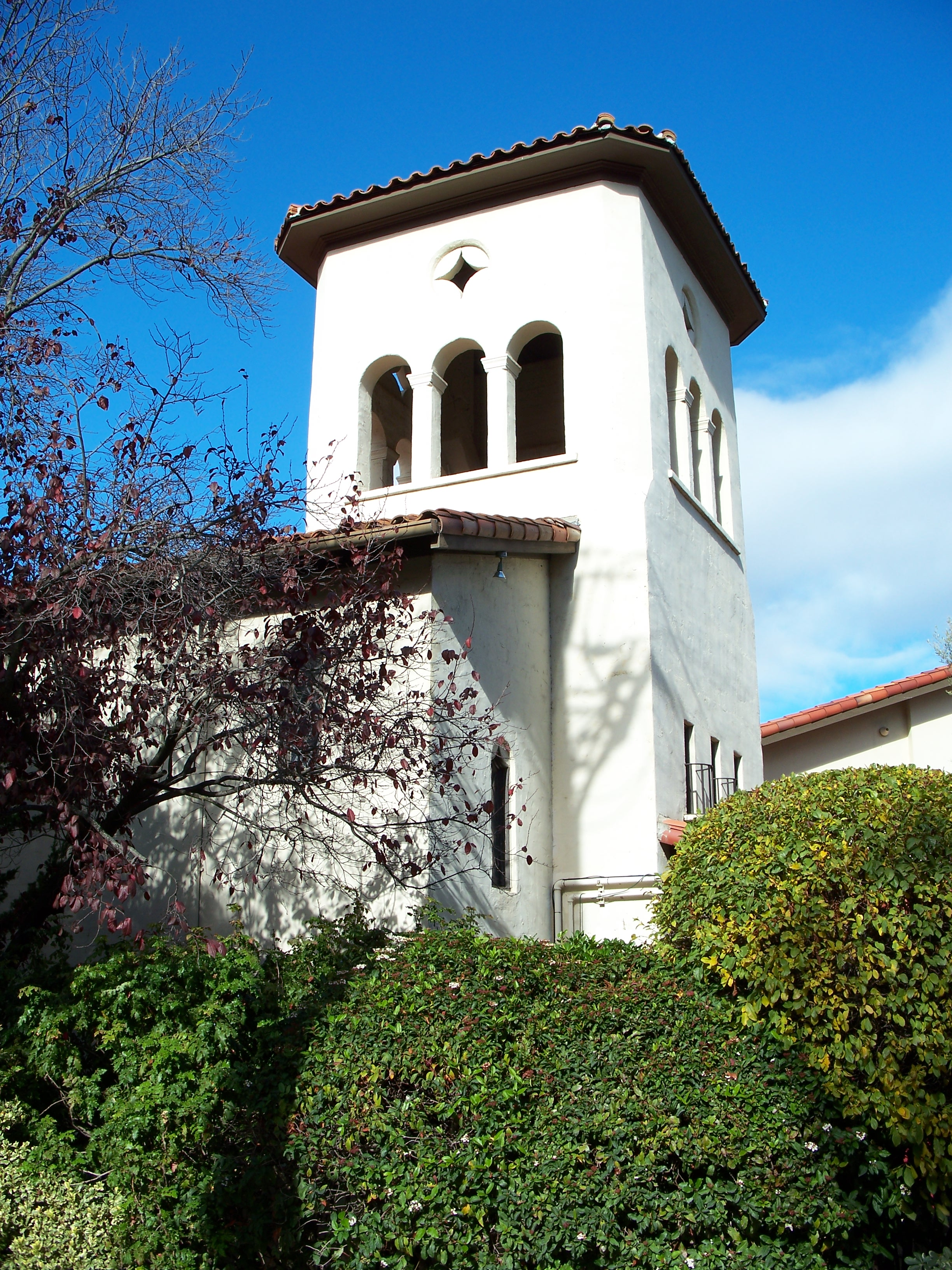
Chapel of the Federated Church, Saratoga, CA

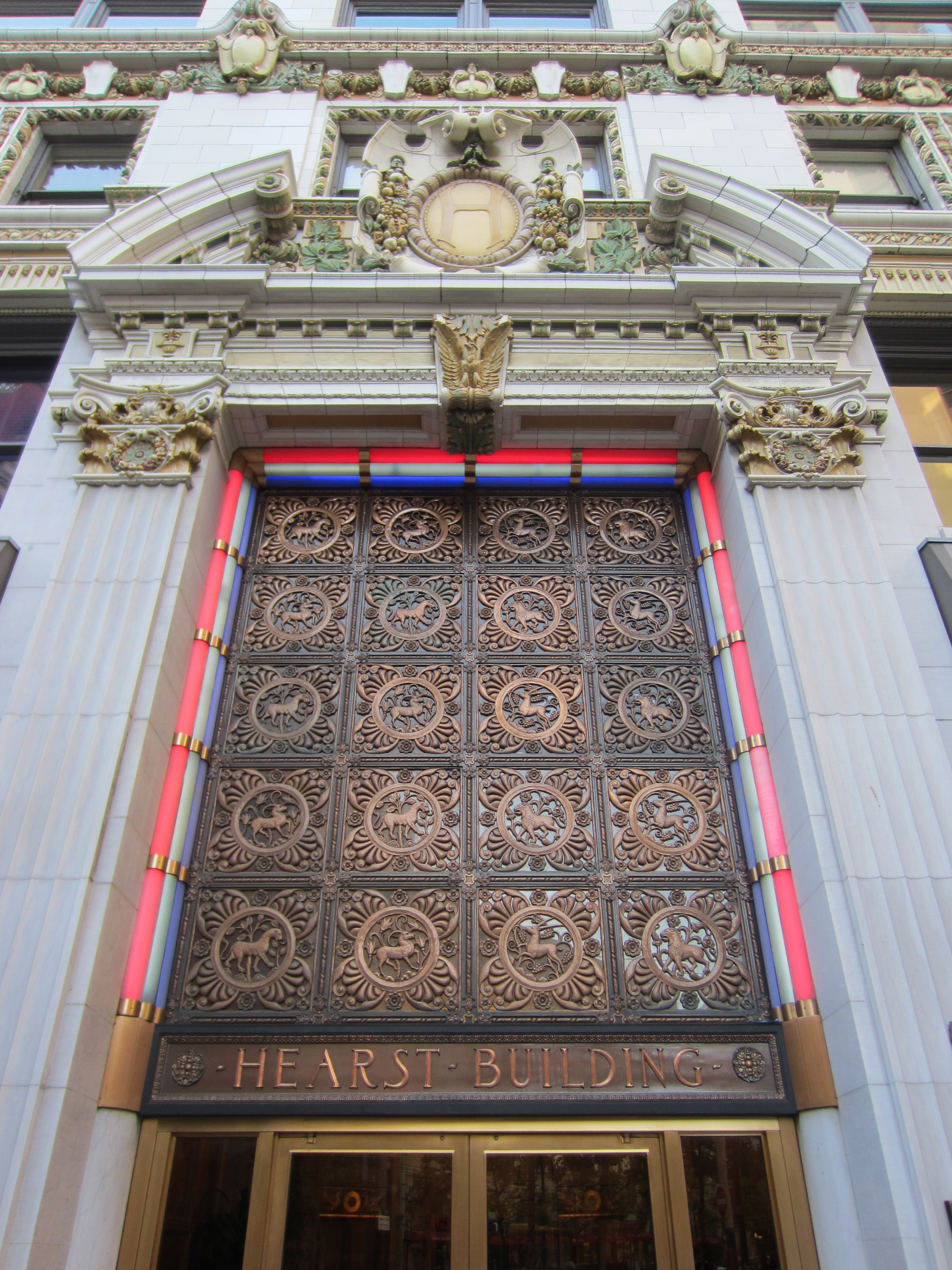
Hearst Building, San Francisco, CA

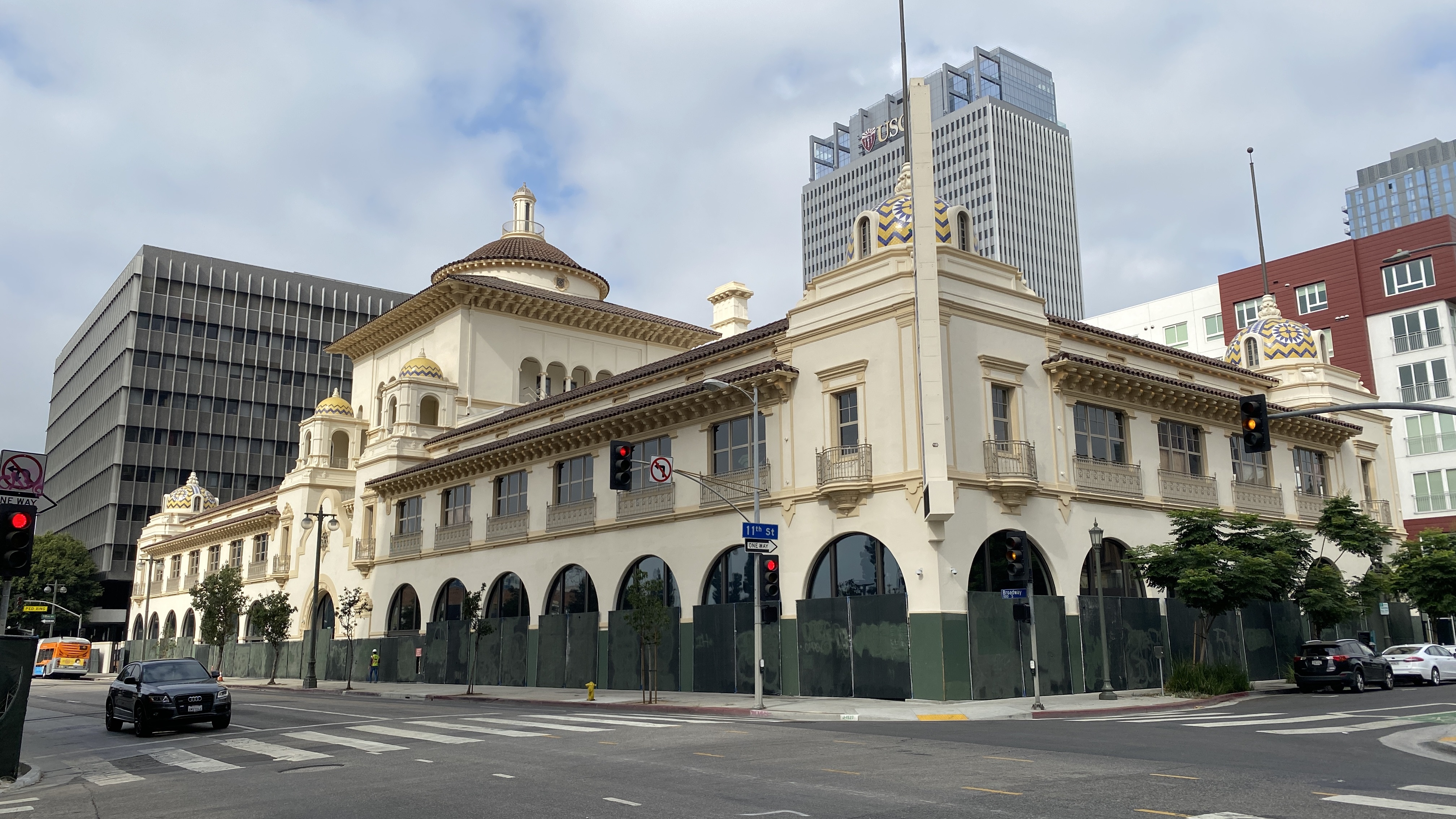
Herald Examiner Building, LA, CA

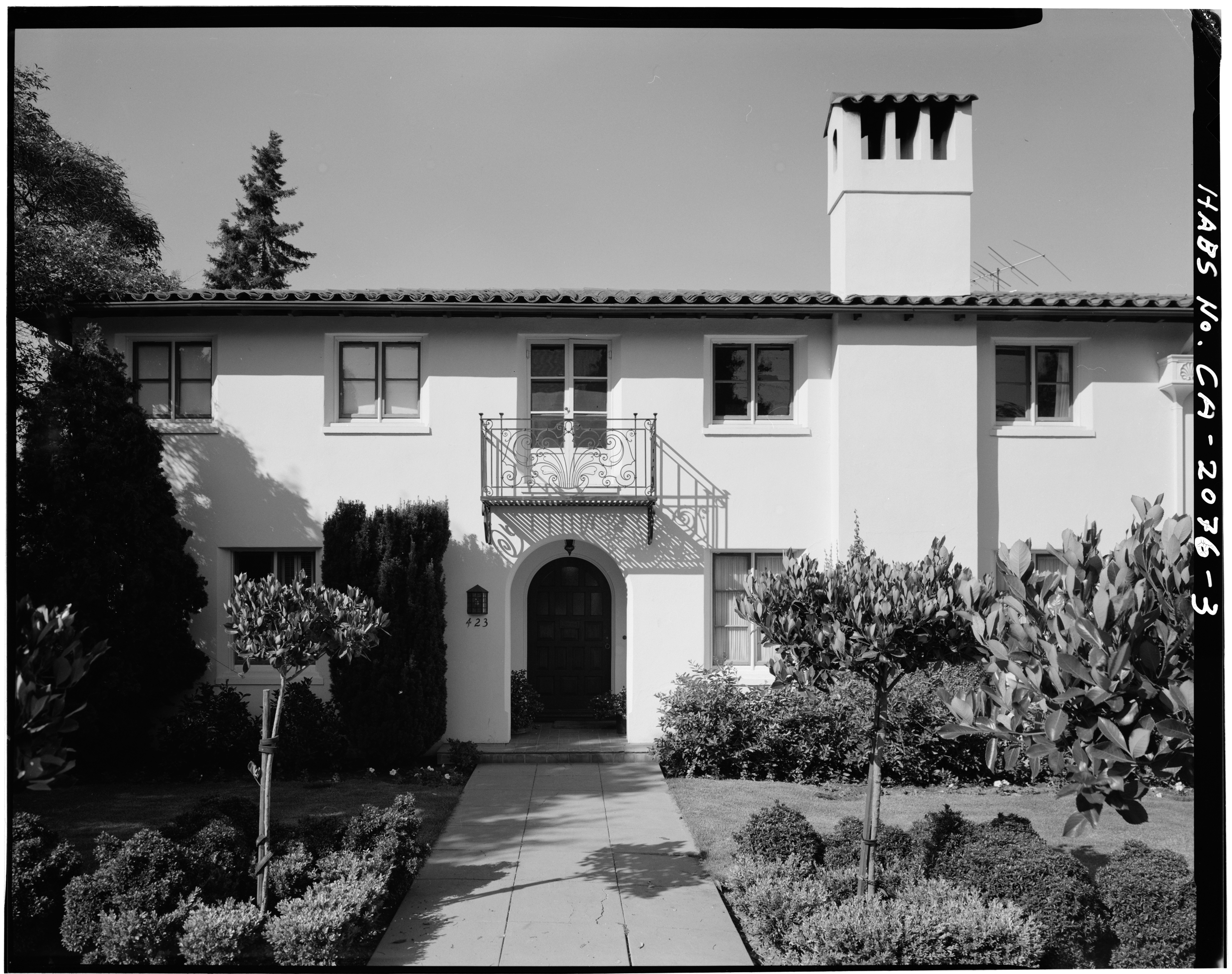
J. G. Kennedy House, Palo Alto, CA

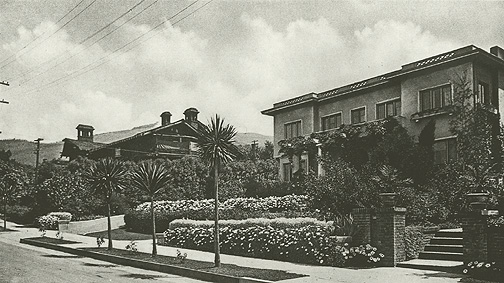
Thorsen & Hicks houses, Berkeley, CA
