= Julia Morgan Building =

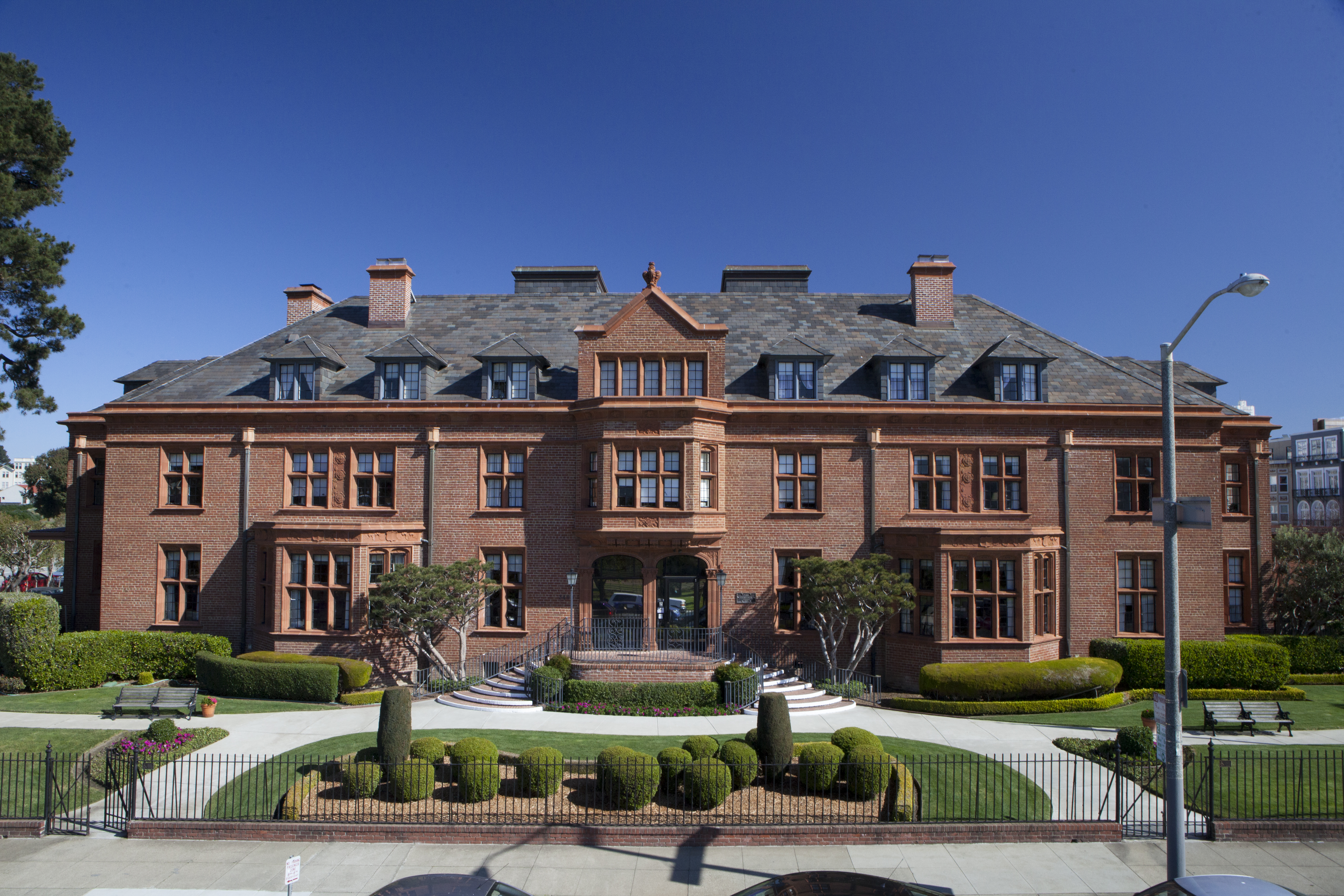
- Julia Morgan Building front elevation
- Interactive map of the Julia Morgan Building area

General information
- Architectural style: Jacobean Revival
- Location: Marina District, 3400 Laguna Street; San Francisco, California
- Coordinates: 37.802917°N 122.431165°W
- Year built: 1924
- Opened: 1925
- Owner: San Francisco Ladies Protection and Relief Society

Technical details
- Material: brick, terracota, slate, reinforced concrete

Design and construction
- Architect: Julia Morgan
- Structural engineer: Walter T. Steilberg

Website
- heritageonthemarina.org

San Francisco Designated Landmark
- Designated: December 12, 2024
- Reference no.: 320

The Julia Morgan Building is a Jacobean Revival building commissioned by the San Francisco Ladies Protection and Relief Society. The building was designed by Julia Morgan and opened its doors in 1925.

Constructed in the Marina District with reinforced concrete for earthquake resilience, the structure showcases a blend of brick, terracotta, and slate, adorned with Tudor rose motifs that symbolize love and protection.

Today, as Heritage on the Marina, the premises serves as a retirement community for the elderly.

== See also ==
- List of works by Julia Morgan
- List of San Francisco Designated Landmarks
