= Alfred E. Warren House =

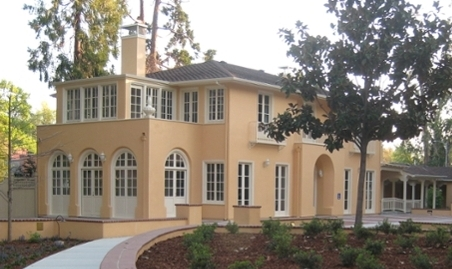
- Interactive map of the Alfred E. Warren House area

General information
- Architectural style: Spanish Colonial Revival; Mediterranean Revival
- Location: 341 Mansion Ave; Chico, California
- Coordinates: 39°43′52″N 121°50′47″W
- Completed: 1922

Design and construction
- Architect: Julia Morgan

The Alfred E. Warren House, also known as President's Mansion, is the official residence of the President of California State University, Chico, located in Chico, California. Designed in 1922 by famed Californian architect Julia Morgan as a private residence, it has served as the university's presidential residence since 1945.

== History ==
The house was built 1922–23, designed by noted architect Julia Morgan, for local doctor Daniel H. Moulton. It is the only building known to have been designed by Morgan in the city. During this

The university purchased the residence in 1945, for $25,750.

It underwent a $1.75 million renovation in 2016.

The house was used as an events center and uninhabited between 1993 and 2023, until current university president Steve Perez moved into the residence in September 2023.

== See also ==
- List of works by Julia Morgan
