= Margaret Carnegie Library =

Library building at Mills College, California, U.S.

Coordinates: 37.7791°N 122.1816°W

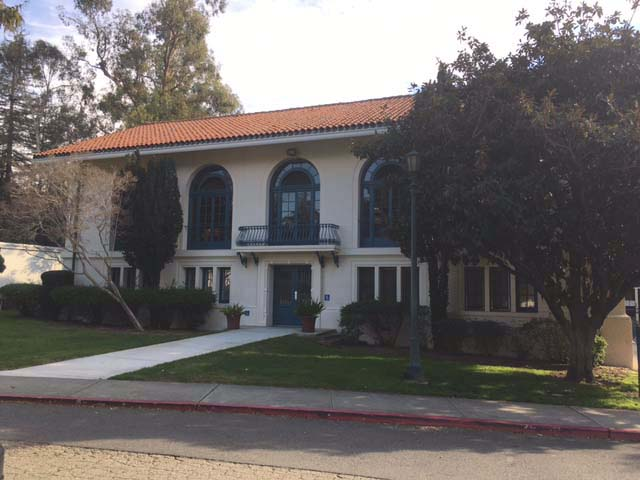
- Location: Mills College, Oakland, California, United States
- Type: Academic
- Established: built 1906
- Architect(s): Julia Morgan

Margaret Carnegie Library is a historic Carnegie Library building completed in 1906 at Mills College in Oakland, California. It was designed by Julia Morgan, the first woman architect to be licensed in California. It was the second of the many Morgan designed buildings on campus. In plan it reflects a design similar to that of the Biblioteque Ste. Genevieve, where the individual enters in the middle of a long narrow building proceeds to the back wall, up the stairs to either left or right up to the reading room, and its interior reflects the structural rationalism taught at L'Ecole des Beaux Arts where Morgan studied architecture. Where the French library displayed the structure with wrought iron double arches, Morgan employed a three part truss made of redwood, a local material more appropriate to California, and reflecting the love she developed for designing trusses while she was a student at the University of California, Berkeley in Civil Engineering.

Made of reinforced concrete it includes steel beams spanning the full width of the building and holding up the second floor, and it uses classical arches and Mission-style architecture details with a red tile roof, iron balconies and arched windows. The interior has exposed wood beams. The library is named for Andrew Carnegie's daughter (his mother was also named Margaret). The reading room, occupying most of the second floor, is named for Albert Bender (art patron), a college trustee and philanthropist.

== See also ==
- El Campanil bell tower
- List of works by Julia Morgan
