= Julia Morgan Hall =

Historic building in Berkeley, California

- Girton Hall
- U.S. National Register of Historic Places
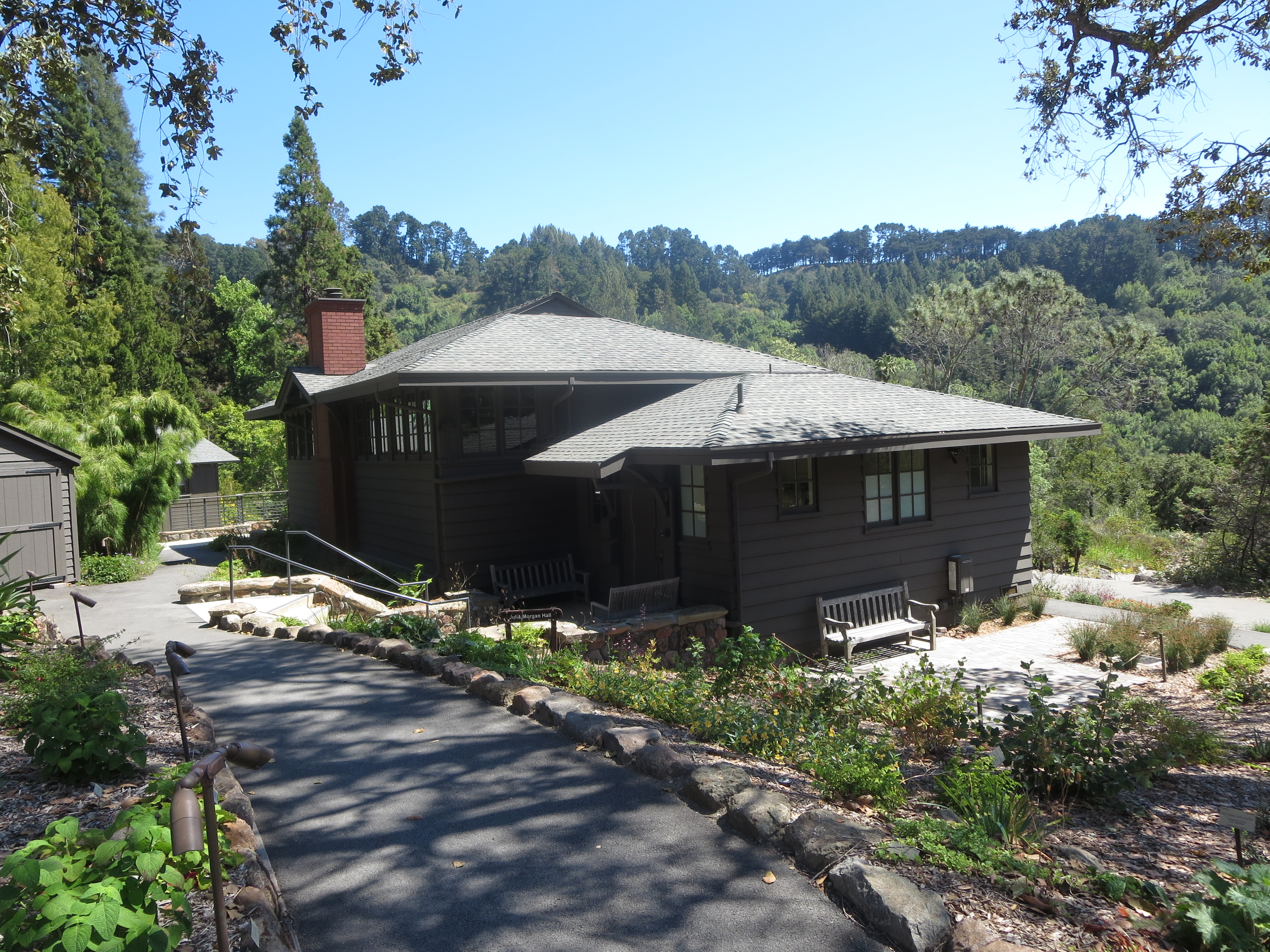
- Julia Morgan Hall (formerly Girton Hall)

- Location within Oakland, California Location within California Location within the United States
- Location: 200 Centennial Drive, University of California Botanical Garden, Berkeley, California 94705
- Coordinates: 37°52′29″N 122°14′18″W
- Area: less than one acre
- Built: 1911
- Architect: Julia Morgan
- Architectural style: Bungalow/Craftsman, First Bay Tradition
- NRHP reference No.: 91001473
- Added to NRHP: September 26, 1991

Julia Morgan Hall (formerly Girton Hall) is a historic building in the University of California Botanical Garden in Berkeley, California. Built in 1911, the building was designed by prominent California architect Julia Morgan and originally located on the central campus of the University of California, Berkeley, near the present location of the Haas School of Business. It served as a gathering place for Berkeley's female students, who wanted a female counterpart to Senior Hall, the senior men's meeting hall.

== History ==
Berkeley's female students began planning the hall in 1909 and raised money for the building between 1909 and 1911. The building was first called Girton Hall during this period; the name came from Girton College at the University of Cambridge, which was the first women's residential college in England. When the building opened in 1911, its name changed to Senior Women's Hall. The hall gave women's groups at Berkeley a place to meet and represented a significant step toward gender equality at the university.

In 1940, the building was moved 160 feet west to make room for a street extension. In 1969, it became a campus child care center, and its name was changed back to Girton Hall to acknowledge its history, even though the name had never been applied to the building after its construction. The building was added to the National Register of Historic Places in 1991.

In 2014, to make way for an expansion of the Haas School of Business, the child care center moved to another location near the university campus, and Girton Hall was cut into four pieces, moved to the UC Botanical Garden, and reassembled. The name of the building was changed to Julia Morgan Hall, and it re-opened to the public in 2015.

== Gallery ==
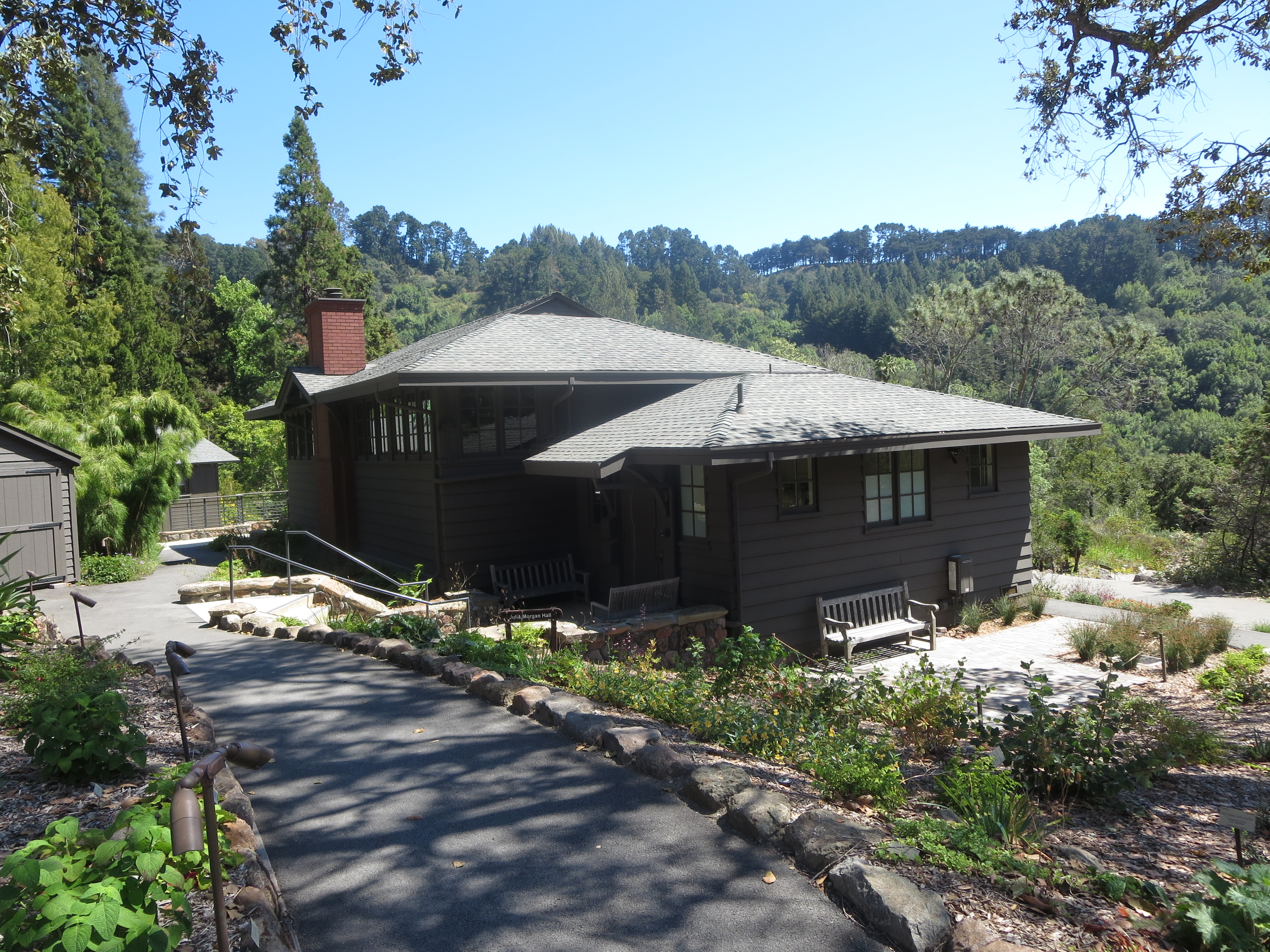
Current location at UC Botanical Garden

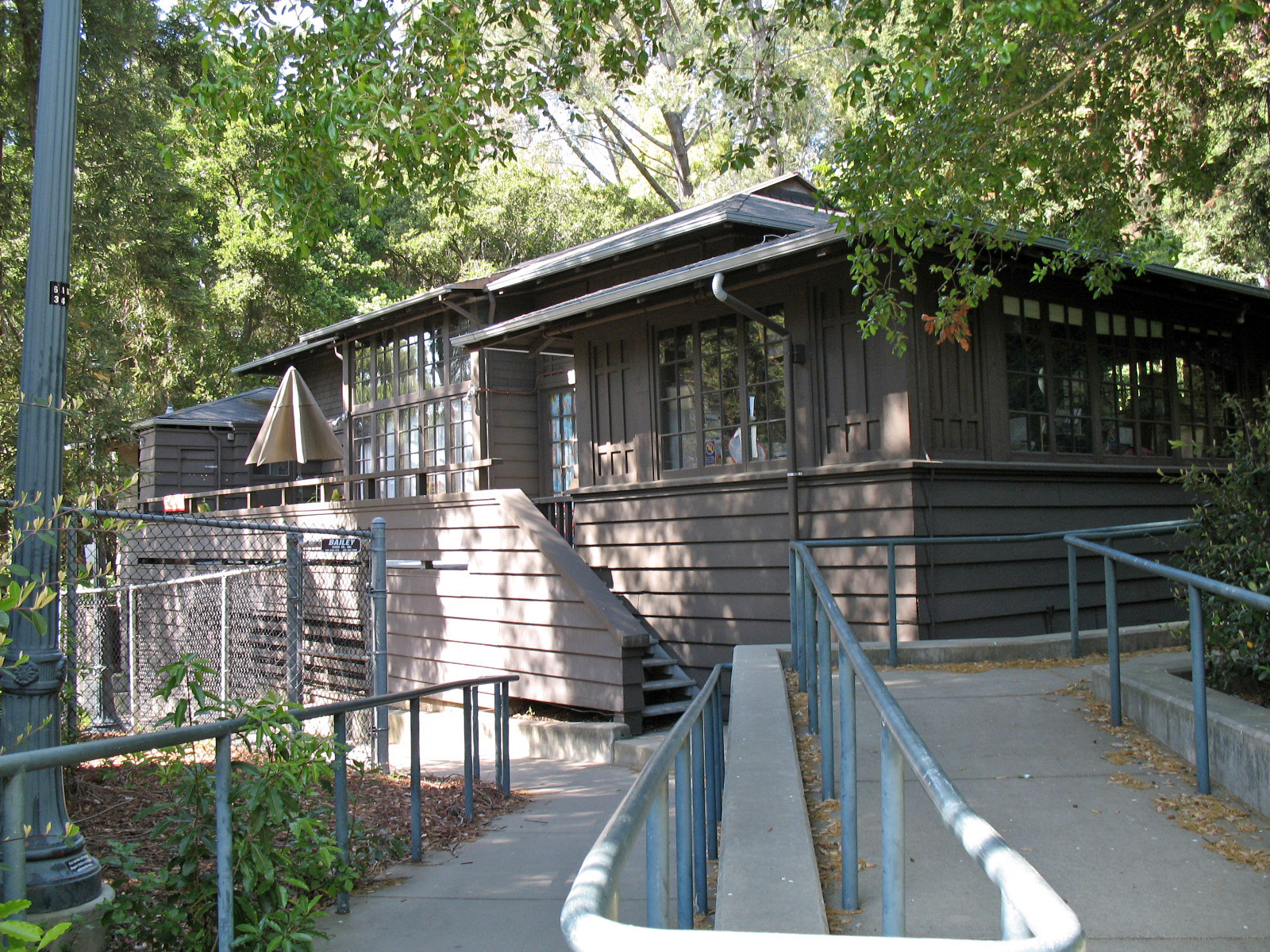
Previous location near Haas School of Business

== See also ==
- List of works by Julia Morgan
- National Register of Historic Places listings in Alameda County, California
