= Saratoga Village Library =

Historic building in California, United States

- U.S. National Register of Historic Places
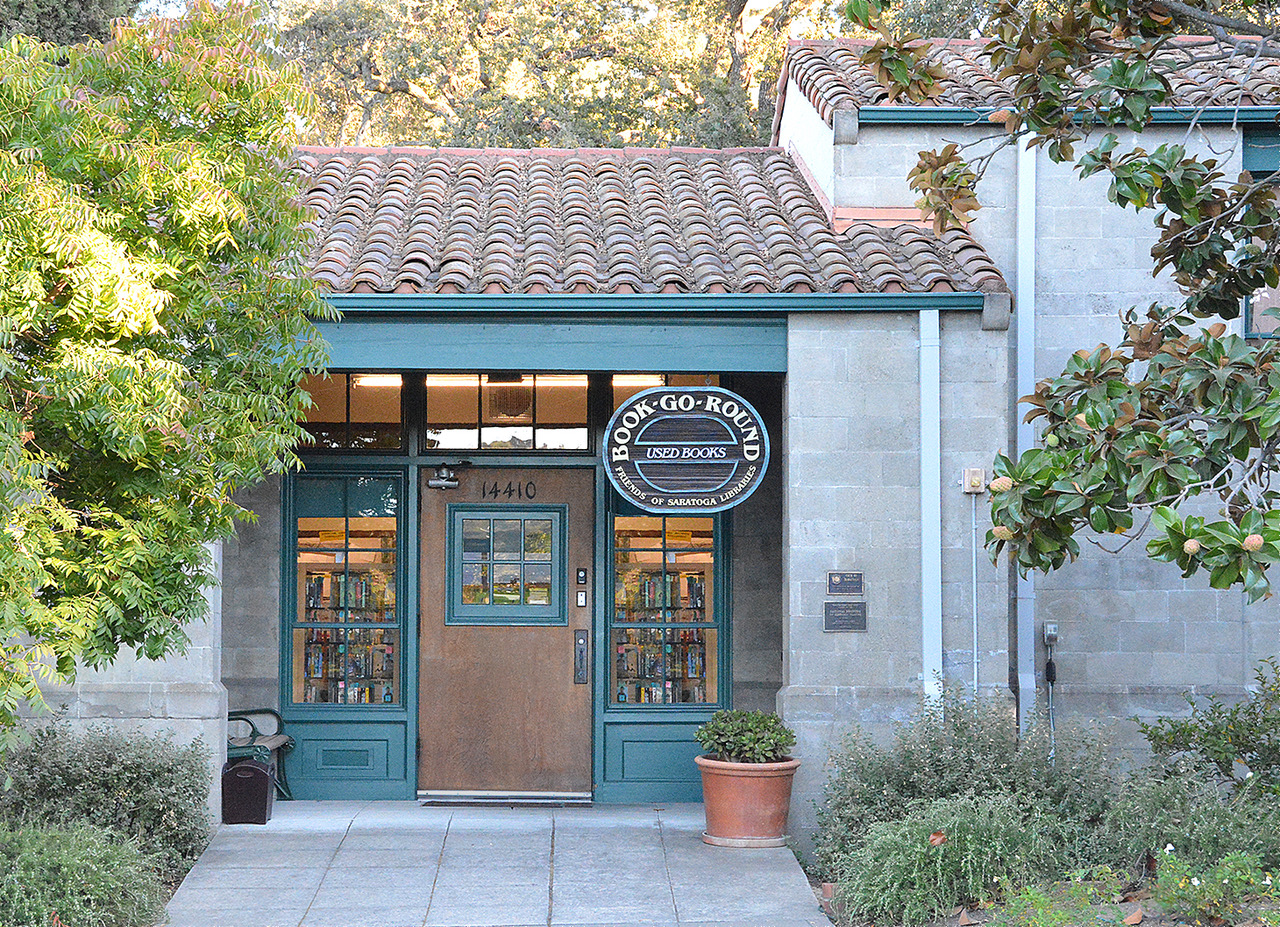
- Saratoga Village Library

- Location within California
- Location: 14410 Oak Street, Saratoga, California, US
- Coordinates: 37°15′28″N 121°1′52″W
- Built: 1927
- Architect: Eldridge T. Spencer
- Architectural style: Spanish Colonial Revival
- Website: www.fslonline.org/bookgoround
- NRHP reference No.: 06001238
- Added to NRHP: January 17, 2007

Saratoga Village Library, formerly known as the Saratoga Library, is a historic building in Saratoga, California designed by architect Eldridge T. Spencer in 1927. The building is historically significant due to its long association with the development of civic life of Saratoga throughout the 20th century, serving as the only library for the community for 51 years. The Saratoga Village Library was placed on the National Register of Historic Places on January 17, 2007. In 1978, the completion of a new Saratoga Library was established on Saratoga Avenue and Fruitvale. The design was also the work of Spencer.

== History ==
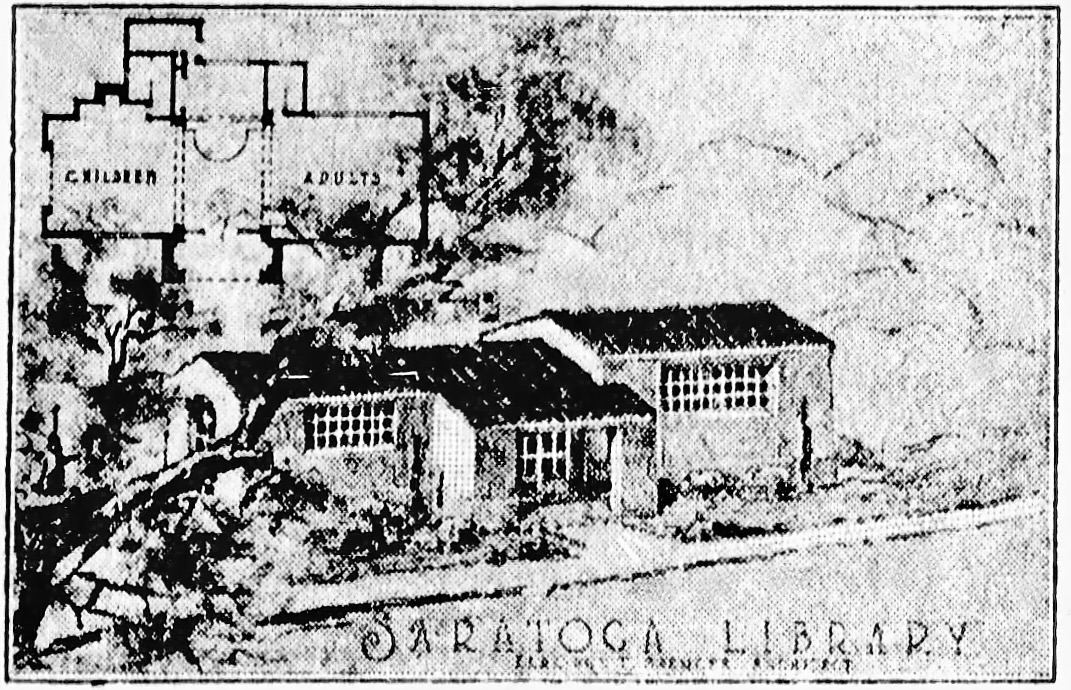
1927 design of the Saratoga Village Library by architect Eldridge T. Spencer.

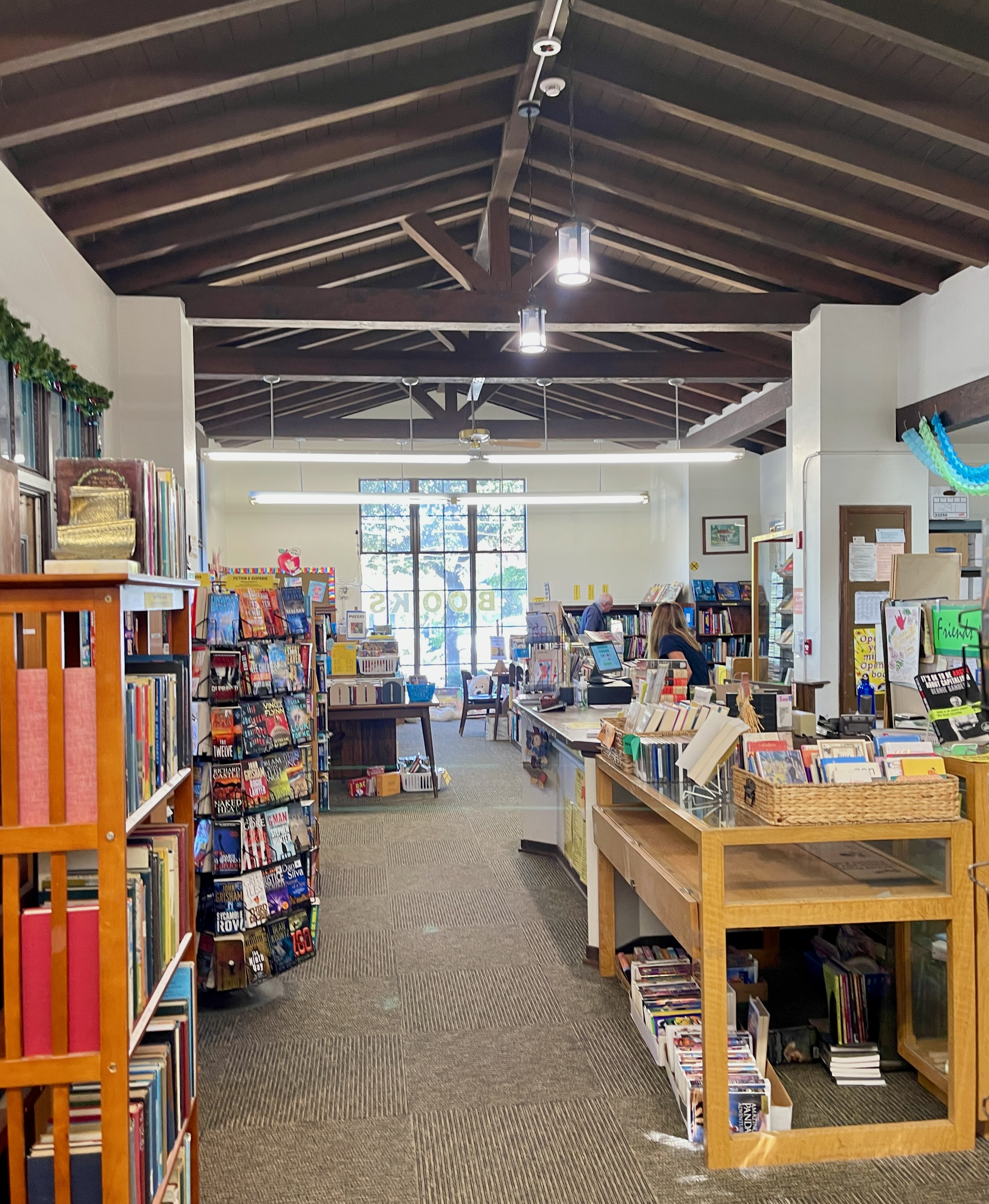
Interior, Saratoga Village Library

In 1914, the Saratoga Library became the fourth branch of the Santa Clara City Library when it was established. The Saratoga Foothill Club, a group of local women, took the initiative to establish Saratoga's first library, initially making books accessible for circulation at the nearby George S. Buckley's drugstore. Clara Buckley, his wife, served as the library's first librarian. In 1921, the Saratoga Library relocated to the Sunday School Room of the former First Christian Church situated on Big Basin Way. Mrs. Nell C. Emrich assumed the role of librarian at this new location. As the demand for a permanent library grew, the Saratoga Foothill Club, in collaboration with Sheldon P. Patterson, raised $12,000 (equivalent to $222,414 in 2025) in private donations, to fund the construction of the new library in 1927. The library's design was entrusted to Eldridge T. Spencer from Oakland, California.

The near completion of the Saratoga Library was announced on June 16, 1927, with architect Spencer describing his design: "Since the library is to be a public building, I felt it should have a feeling of monumentality." September 22, 1927, marked the opening of the Saratoga Library, located at the intersection of Oak Street and Los Gatos Road. A formal dedication ceremony, commemorating the inauguration of this newly constructed library, was held on November 7, 1927. During this event, Ruth Comfort Mitchell, a Californian poet and novelist residing in nearby Los Gatos, recited a poem titled The Magic House, she had crafted specifically for the occasion.

Over the years from 1927 to 1978, the library functioned as the central hub for various social and educational events. Activities included reading hours, book clubs catering to school-age children, lectures delivered by both local and visiting authors, book sales, and displays showcasing the work of local artists and photographers.

=== Design ===
The library is a single-story Spanish Colonial Revival-style building that was designed by Eldridge "Ted" Spencer in 1927. It is located at 14410 Oak Street in Saratoga Village, Saratoga, California. The 3,082 square feet (286.3 m^{2}) structure occupies the majority of the 121.8 ft (37.1 m) x 62.5 ft (19.1 m) lot, and both the lot and the building's exterior have undergone minimal changes since their original construction. The library's environment has a variety of mature trees encircling the building, featuring species such as deodar cedars, redwoods, cypress, magnolias, and oaks. The library grounds were designed by a local landscaping expert, Harriet Parsons. The exterior features concrete blocks and a red Terracotta tile roof. The light grey interlocking concrete blocks used were known as Thermotite, a fire-resistant building material. The interior walls were built using a standard wood frame. Inside is a single room that is divided into three sections by bookshelves, accommodating a capacity of 10,000 books. These sections were initially designated for use by adults, library staff, and children. There is a fireplace in what was the children's room and a great window reaching the floor. The architect placed significant emphasis on the design of the windows to provide the best light for reading.

=== Friends of the Saratoga Library ===
In 1978, the completion of a new Saratoga Library was established on Saratoga Avenue and Fruitvale that was also designed by Eldridge T. Spencer. The old Village Library branch continued to operate as a secondary community library for an additional five years.

In 1983, the Friends of the Saratoga Libraries, a non-profit, all-volunteer organization dedicated to supporting the Saratoga Library, took charge of the former library building located at the corner of Oak Street and Los Gatos Road, repurposing it into the Book-Go-Round bookstore.

On January 17, 2007, the Saratoga Village Library was placed on the National Register of Historic Places. A memorial plaque positioned at the front entrance pays tribute to Sheldon P. Patterson, who spearheaded a citizens' committee in procuring the land and overseeing the construction of the library. Two additional entrance plaques are present; one identifies the property's inclusion in the National Register of Historic Places, and the other designates it as City of Saratoga Heritage Resource No. 9.

== Gallery ==
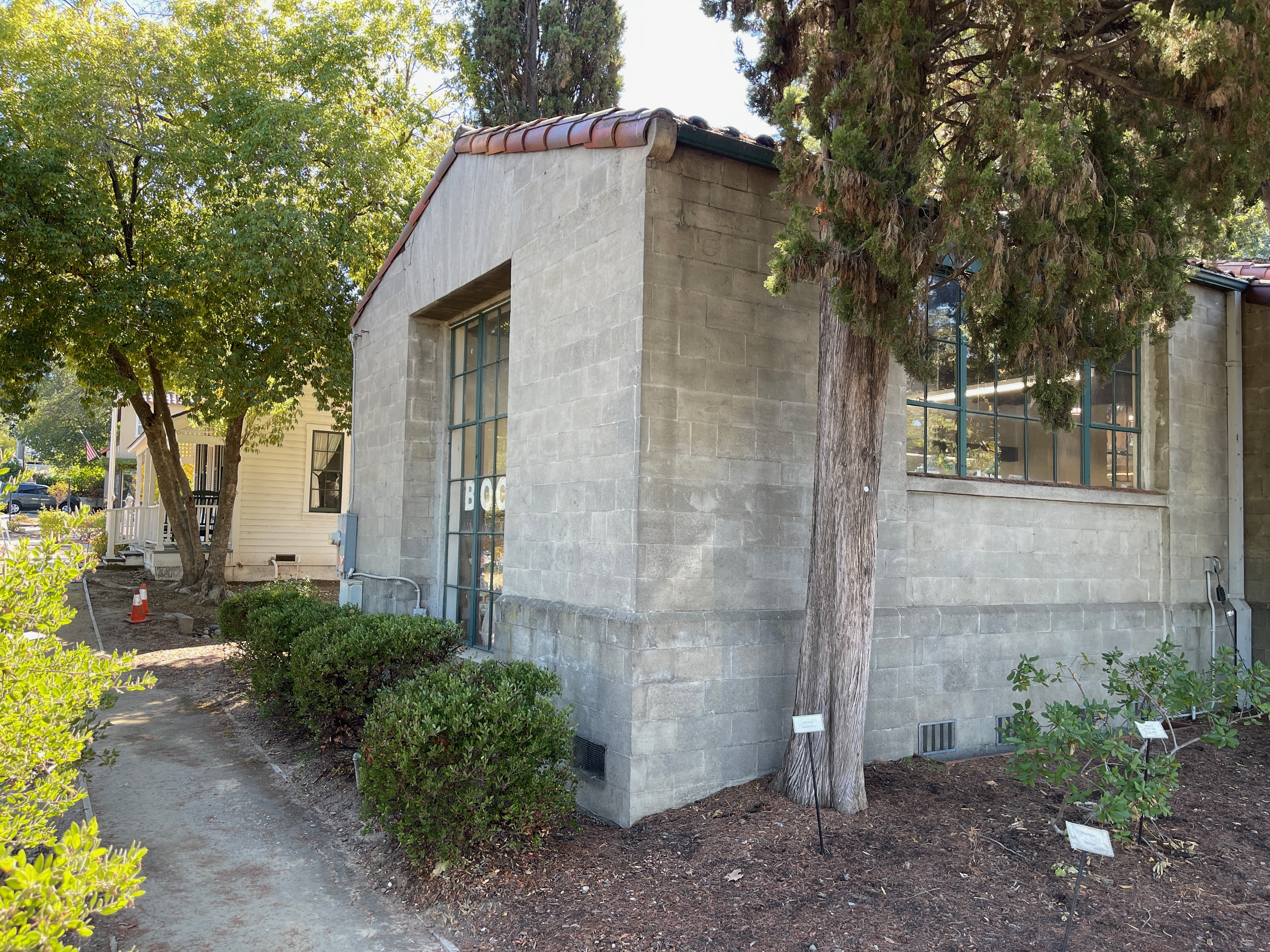
Saratoga Village Library Side View

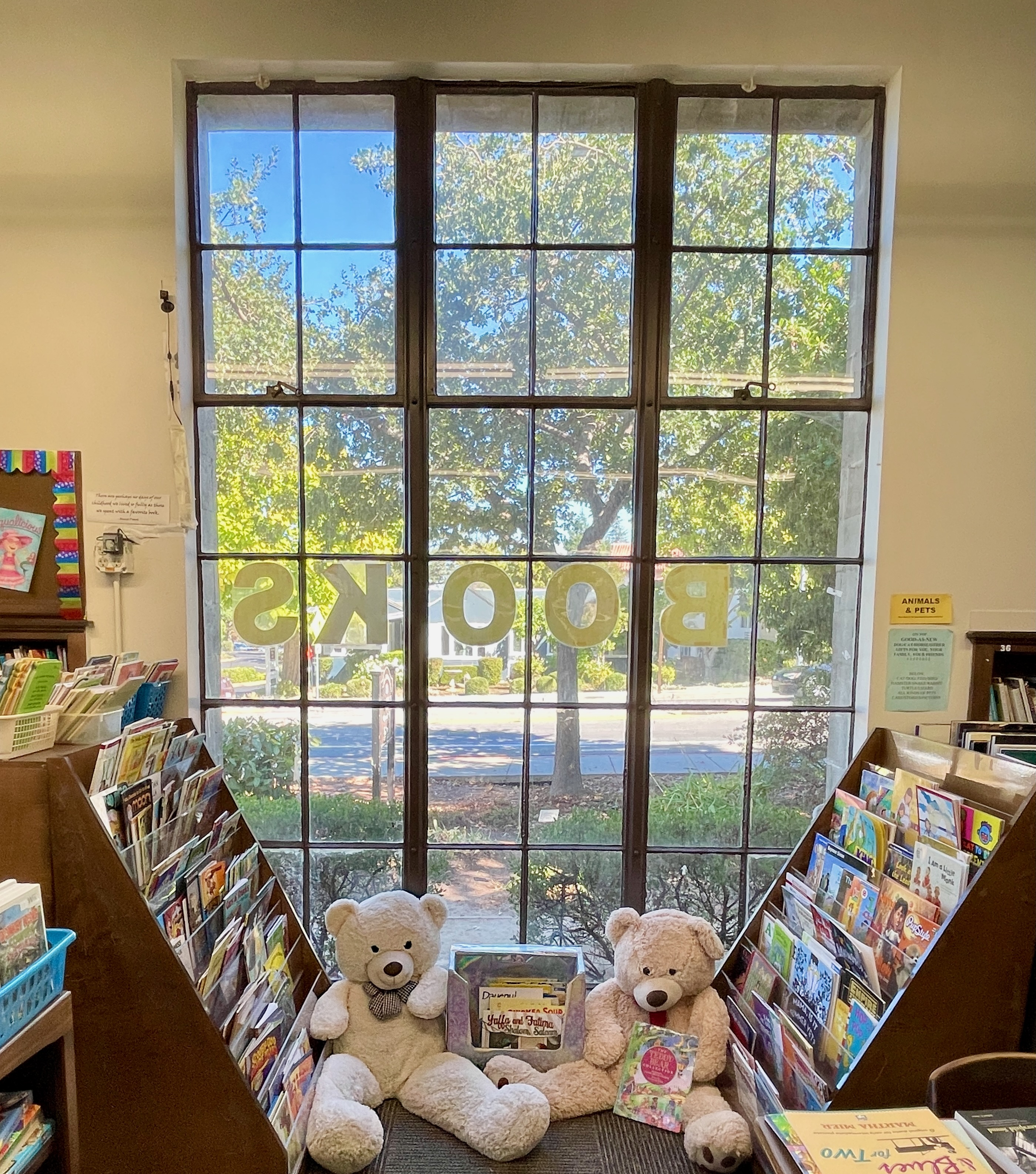
Windows, Saratoga Village Library

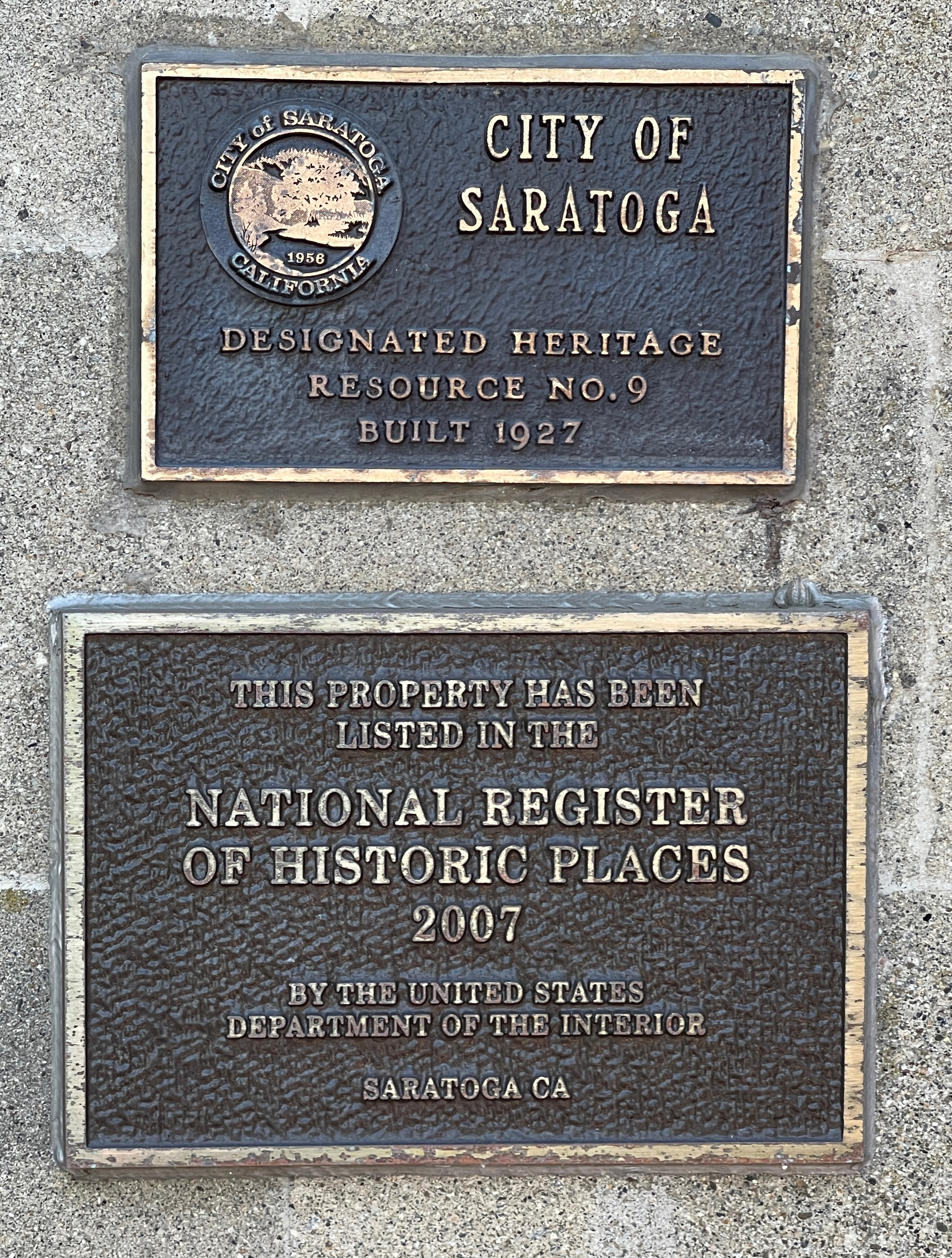
Two memorial plaques for the Saratoga Village Library

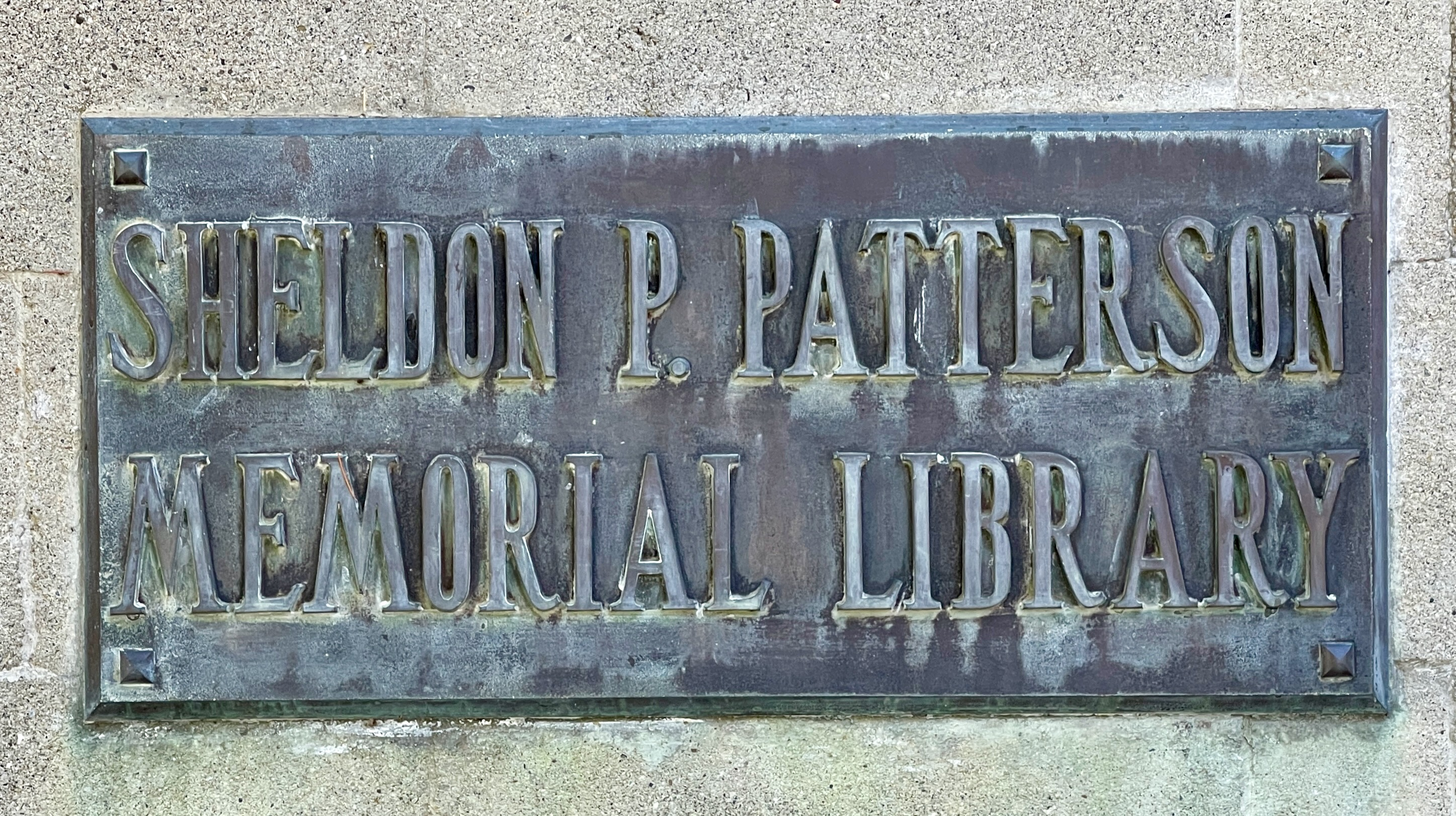
Sheldon P. Patterson memorial plaque

== See also ==
- List of cities and towns in California
- California Historical Landmarks in Santa Clara County
