= Saratoga Foothill Club =

Building in California, United States

- U.S. National Register of Historic Places
- Foothill Clubhouse
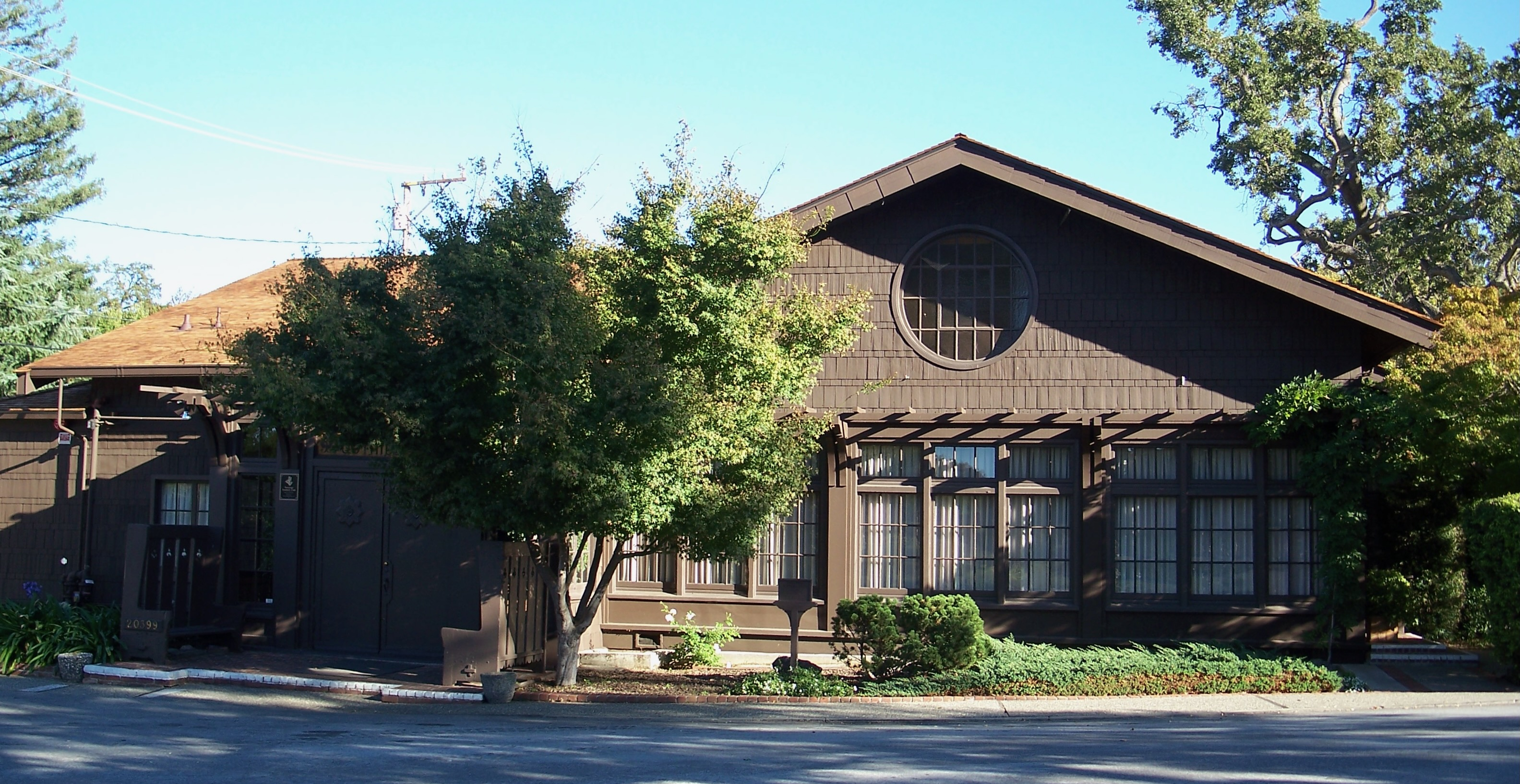
- Saratoga Foothill Club

- Location within San Jose, California
- Location: 20399 Park Place, Saratoga, California, US
- Coordinates: 37°15′32.5″N 122°1′47.9″W
- Built: 1915
- Architect: Julia Morgan
- Architectural style: By region, American Craftsman
- Website: www.saratogafoothillclub.com
- NRHP reference No.: 05000069
- Added to NRHP: February 27, 2005

Saratoga Foothill Club, also known as the Foothill Clubhouse, is a building located in Saratoga, California. The club was placed on the National Register of Historic Places on February 27, 2005.

== History ==
Title sheet with site plan and roof plan for Saratoga Foothill Club, 20399 Park Place, Saratoga, Santa Clara County, California.

Established in 1907 under the name "Foothill Study Club," this organization comprised a small circle of local women who gathered in the homes of members to engage in self-improvement activities, including reading and public speaking. The Club sought contributions from the community to fund the construction of a clubhouse. The land for the building was donated by Mrs. Davis C. Bell and Mrs. George A. Wood, both active community members. They enlisted the services of San Francisco-based architect, Julia Morgan, to design the building, which was constructed in 1915. The building is located at 20399 Park Place within what was formerly known as Saratoga Village, situated in Santa Clara County, California. The organization's aim is to "further educational and social and civic work of the community."

The Saratoga Foothill Club has played a role in the community's social history. In 1927, club members raised $12,000 (equivalent to $222,414 in 2025) to fund the construction of the Saratoga Village Library, the first library in Saratoga. The club has been in continuous service as a women's club, while also serving the community gatherings, cultural events, meetings, and receptions. The club's building served as the village's first movie theater from 1917 to the early 1920s.

=== Design ===
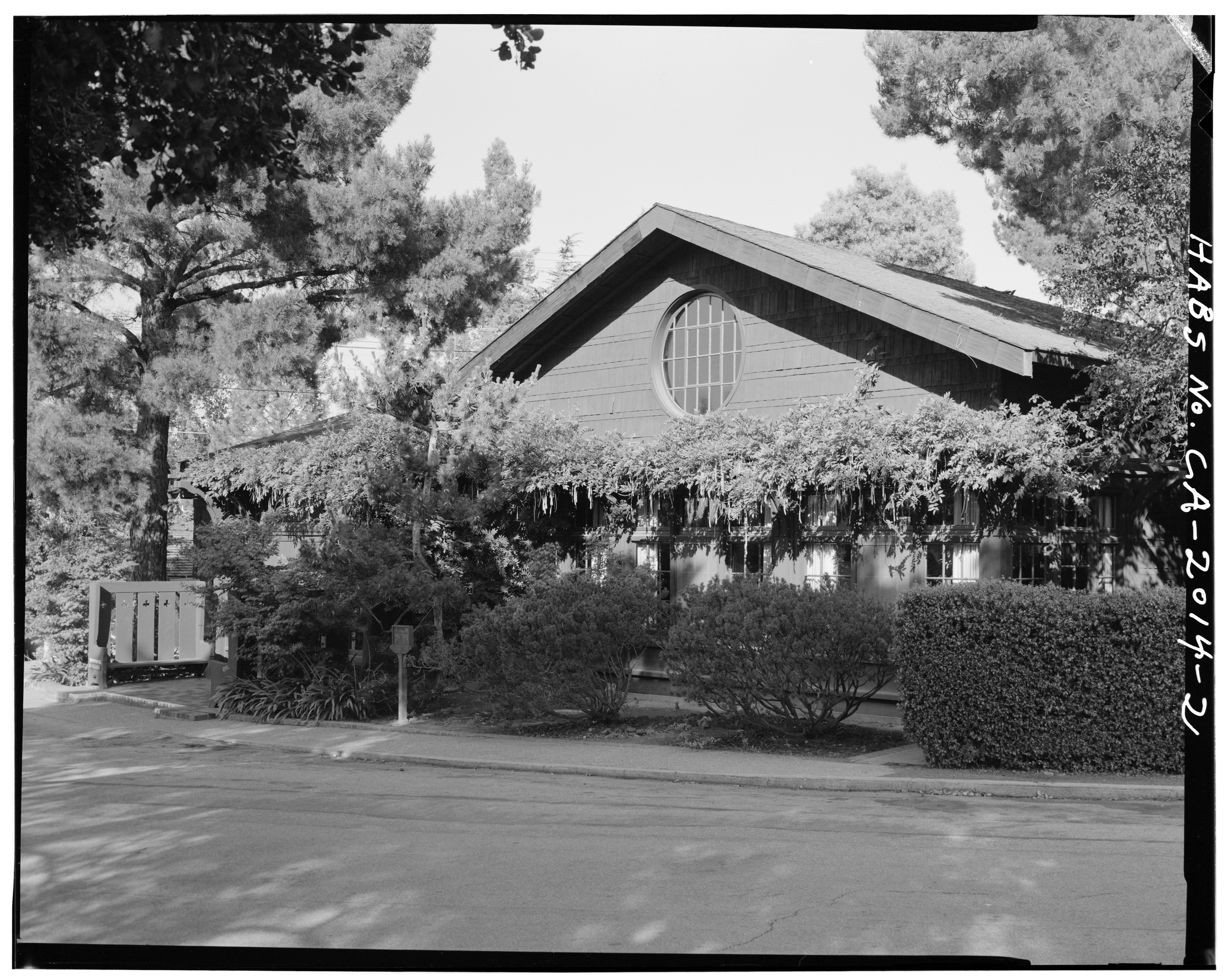
Front of the Saratoga Foothill Club, looking west-northwest.

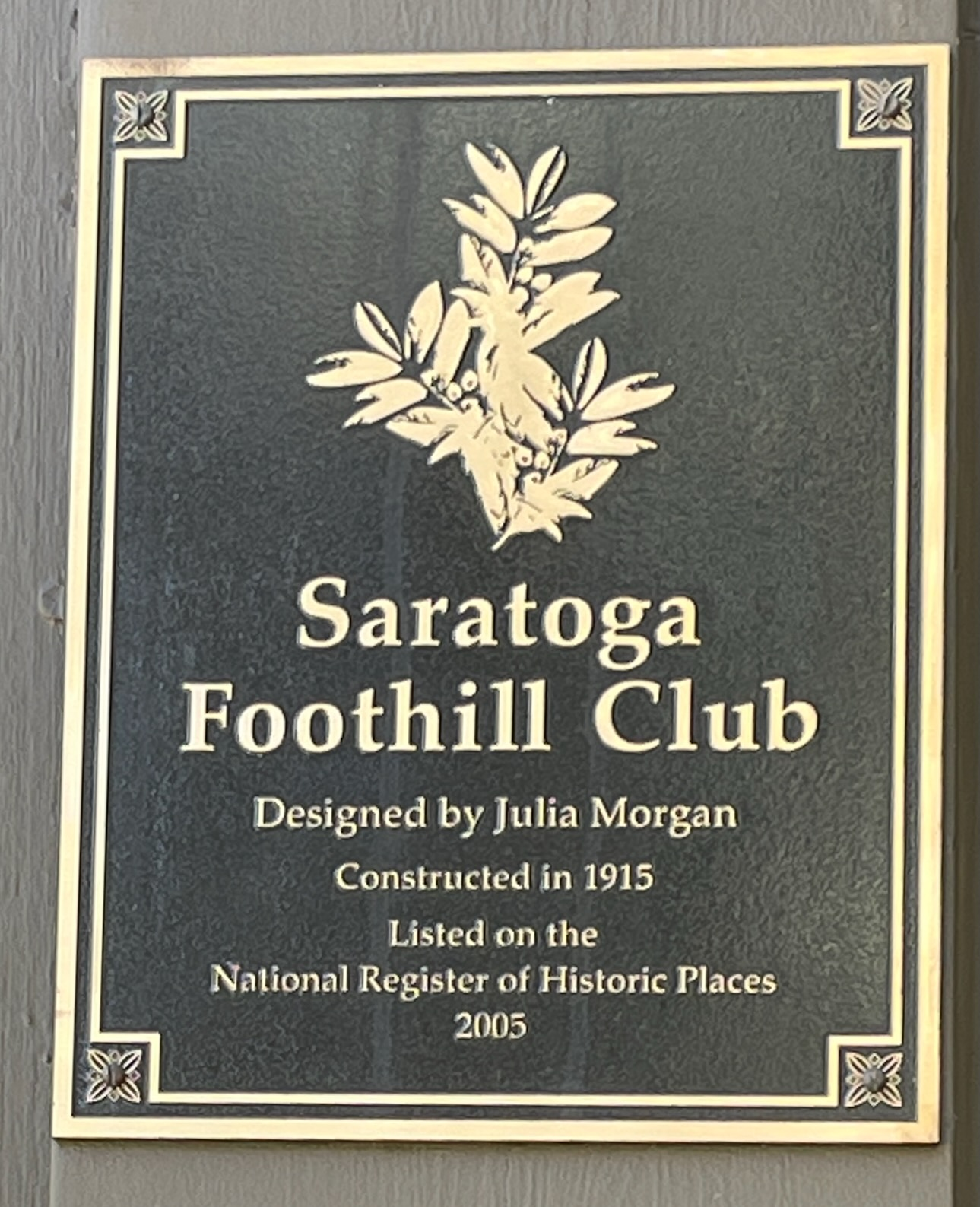
Saratoga Foothill Club National Register of Historic Places Plaque

The Saratoga Foothill Club is a one-story redwood building with a By region, American Craftsman-style designed by architect Julia Morgan. The one-story redwood shingled structure, with its pebble paved courtyard and grounds, occupies the 7,409 square feet (688.3 m^{2}) city lot. Blueprints and specifications for the club are available at Online Archive of California.

Within the courtyard's surroundings there is a sculpture of Julia Morgan wearing a bowler hat created by Jerry Smith to commemorate the Saratoga Foothill Club's centennial (1907-2007). There is also a sculpture featuring the poem titled The Gentle Gardener by Edgar A. Guest, accompanied by the inscription thanking Miles Rankin for funding the garden 2011 restoration project.

== Historically significant ==
In 1988, the City of Saratoga affixed a memorial plaque inside the Foothill Clubhouse, officially recognizing it as the community's Heritage Resource No. 1. On February 27, 2005, the Saratoga Foothill Club was placed on the National Register of Historic Places. There is memorial plaque at the front entrance that identifies the building's inclusion on the National Register of Historic Places, designed by Julia Morgan.

== See also ==
- List of works by Julia Morgan
- List of women's clubs in the United States
- National Register of Historic Places listings in Santa Clara County, California
