= San Francisco Ladies Protection and Relief Society =

American philanthropic foundation

- Founded: August 4, 1853; 173 years ago
- Founder: Mrs. A. B. Eaton
- Type: 501(c)(3), charitable organization
- Registration no.: RCFE #380500295
- Purpose: To be an innovative, charitable model for serving the needs of seniors, and to utilize its resources and expertise to serve the San Francisco community.
- Location: San Francisco, California
- Coordinates: 37.801763°N 122.4348336°W
- Services: Elderly care, Continuing Care Retirement Community
- Chairman: Lewis Randy Gridley
- CEO: Mary Linde
- Website: heritageonthemarina.org

The San Francisco Ladies Protection and Relief Society, now known as Heritage on the Marina, is a non-profit foundation that operates a Continuing Care Retirement Community in the Marina District of San Francisco, California. Founded in 1853 with the mission "to render protection and assistance to strangers, to sick independent women and children," the organization has provided a variety of philanthropic benefits to generations of San Franciscans. They provide three levels of care — independent living, assisted-living, and memory & cognitive support, the Society's strategic plan envisages transitioning to an aging-in-place model. The premises are of historical and architectural merit, including structures designed by architects Julia Morgan, Warren Charles Perry, and Gardner Dailey.

In 2024, the building was listed as a San Francisco Designated Landmark (SFDL).

== History ==
The following timeline was extracted from photos of posters created by Jean Fowler and other residents for the 160th anniversary of the Society. The originals are housed in binders in the Stucky Library at Heritage on the Marina.

- 1853 — On August 4, the San Francisco Ladies Protection and Relief Society is established by Mrs. A. B. Eaton to assist women and families stranded by the Gold Rush.
- 1857 — The Society founds a home for women and children needing shelter. A house at Second and Tehama streets is rented for $25 per month and is called "Hospitality House".
- 1860 — Horace Hawes donates a lot bounded by Van Ness, Geary, Franklin, and Post streets to the Society for a permanent home.
- 1862–3 Work begins on a building design by S C Bugbee for the lot on Franklin St, a home for children, known as "The Ladies' Home for Children", also the "Old Brown Ark".
- 1869 — Only $40 remains in the Society's treasury; the president pleads for donations in her annual report.
- 1875 — Substantial gifts acquired from 1875 to 1896 improve the San Francisco Ladies' Protection and Relief Society's financial situation.
- 1880 — The California State Legislature passes an act appropriating money to support orphans, half-orphans, and abandoned children at institutions like The Ladies' Home for Children.
- 1889 — The Society raises $668 with a charity baseball game between the Pacific Union Club and Bohemian Club.
- 1898 — Sufficient funds are collected to begin work on the north wing of th Ladies' Home for Children.
- 1901 — A fragment of the cabin from the shipwrecked SS City of Rio de Janeiro is found near Alcatraz with the Society's collection box containing coins still intact. That box now hangs in the Heritage on the Marina entrance.
- 1906 — After the earthquake, the "Old Brown Ark" is declared unsafe. One hundred forty-five children were evacuated to tents in the Presidio.
- 1913 — Children of the Ladies' Home enjoyed their first summer vacation outside the city
- 1921 — A new program introduced by state authorities places orphaned children in foster homes, diminishing the need for children's homes
- 1922 — The Society decides to change its focus from children to "the care of elderly women and convalescent women and children"
- 1922 — The Society acquires property bounded by Franklin, Bay, Laguna and Octavia streets; Kate F Austin generously offered it as a gift, but the society paid a token of $10 for it
- 1923 — In March, the trustees approve architect Julia Morgan's plans for the Laguna Street building that will become known as the Heritage in 1959
- 1923 — The Ladies' Home for Children on Franklin Street closes its doors
- 1925 — On March 3, the Society's new home for elderly women and convalescents at 3400 Laguna Street begins operation
- 1953 — The Society celebrates its centennial
- 1953 Two adjoining properties, the Francisco Street flats, were purchased to provide space for staff, made possible by a gift from Edith and Lucy Allyne
- 1954 — The San Francisco Ladies' Protection and Relief Society and the Crocker Old People's Home plan a merger. Architect Warren Perry was commissioned to develop plans to enlarge the home on Laguna Street to accommodate residents of both sexes
- 1957 — Former residents of the Crocker Old People's Home move in and become part of the family at the Society's home on Laguna Street. The Laguna Street home becomes certified as a Life Care institution
- 1958 — The Perry building is completed and made ready for occupancy
- 1959 — The enlarged home on Laguna Street is named The Heritage
- 1963 — The Health Center – a skilled nursing facility – designed by Gardiner Dailey is built
- 1977 — The Chinatown Kitchen Programs begins providing nutritious at-cost meals to low-income seniors
- 1986 — The Health Center is substantially remodeled and Friendship Hall is built
- 1989 — In October, a major earthquake hits northern California, but The Heritage emerges almost untouched
- 1996 — Heritage dining room is remodeled'
- 2000 — The San Francisco Ladies Protection and Relief Society Board of Trustees combines with the Board of Managers to form a new board of directors
- 2002 — The original slate roof on The Heritage is replaced
- 2003 — The San Francisco Ladies' Protection and Relief Society celebrates its 150th anniversary

== Premises ==
=== Julia Morgan Building (1925–present) ===
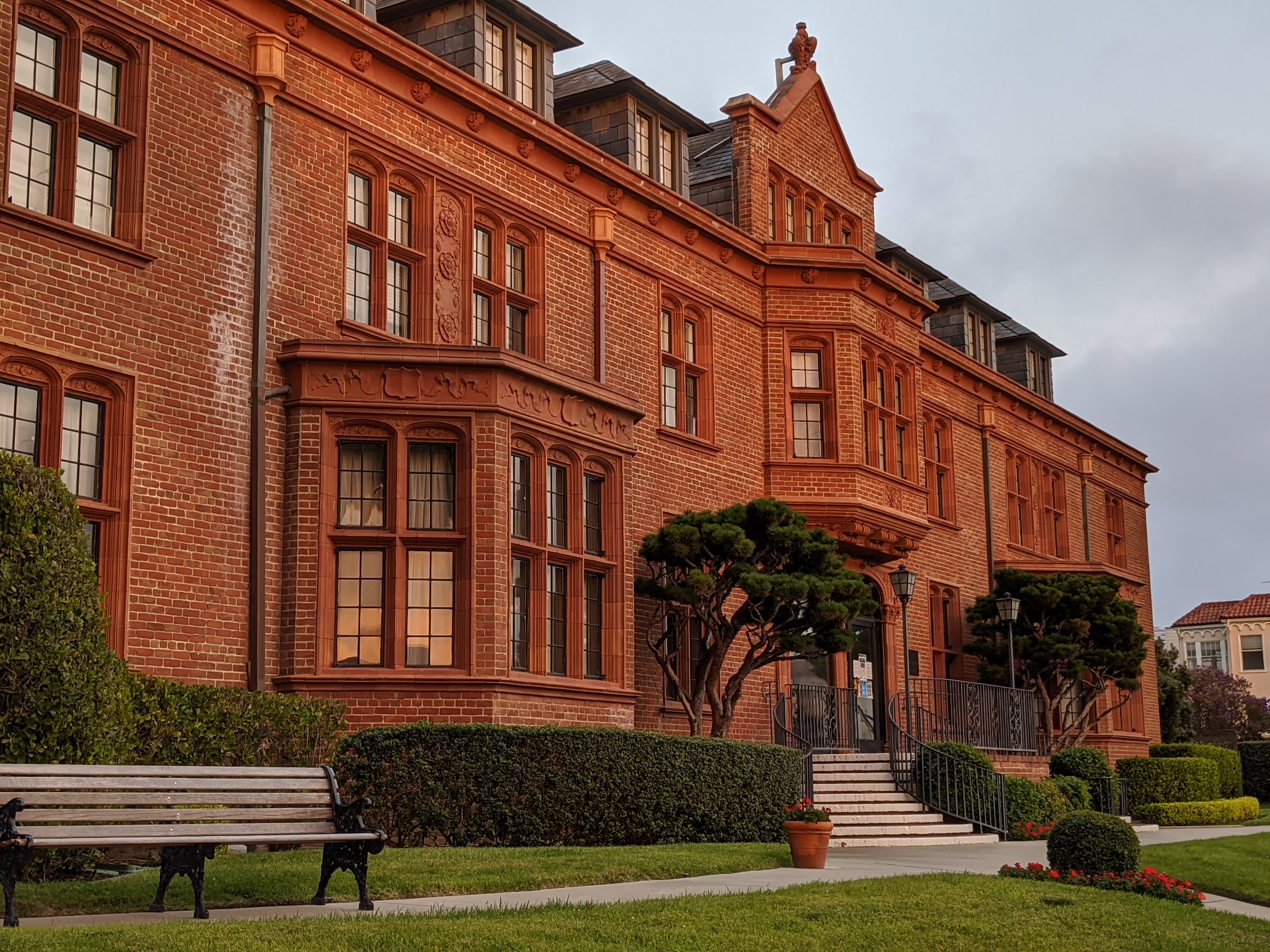
Heritage on the Marina at 3400 Laguna Street, San Francisco, designed by Julia Morgan

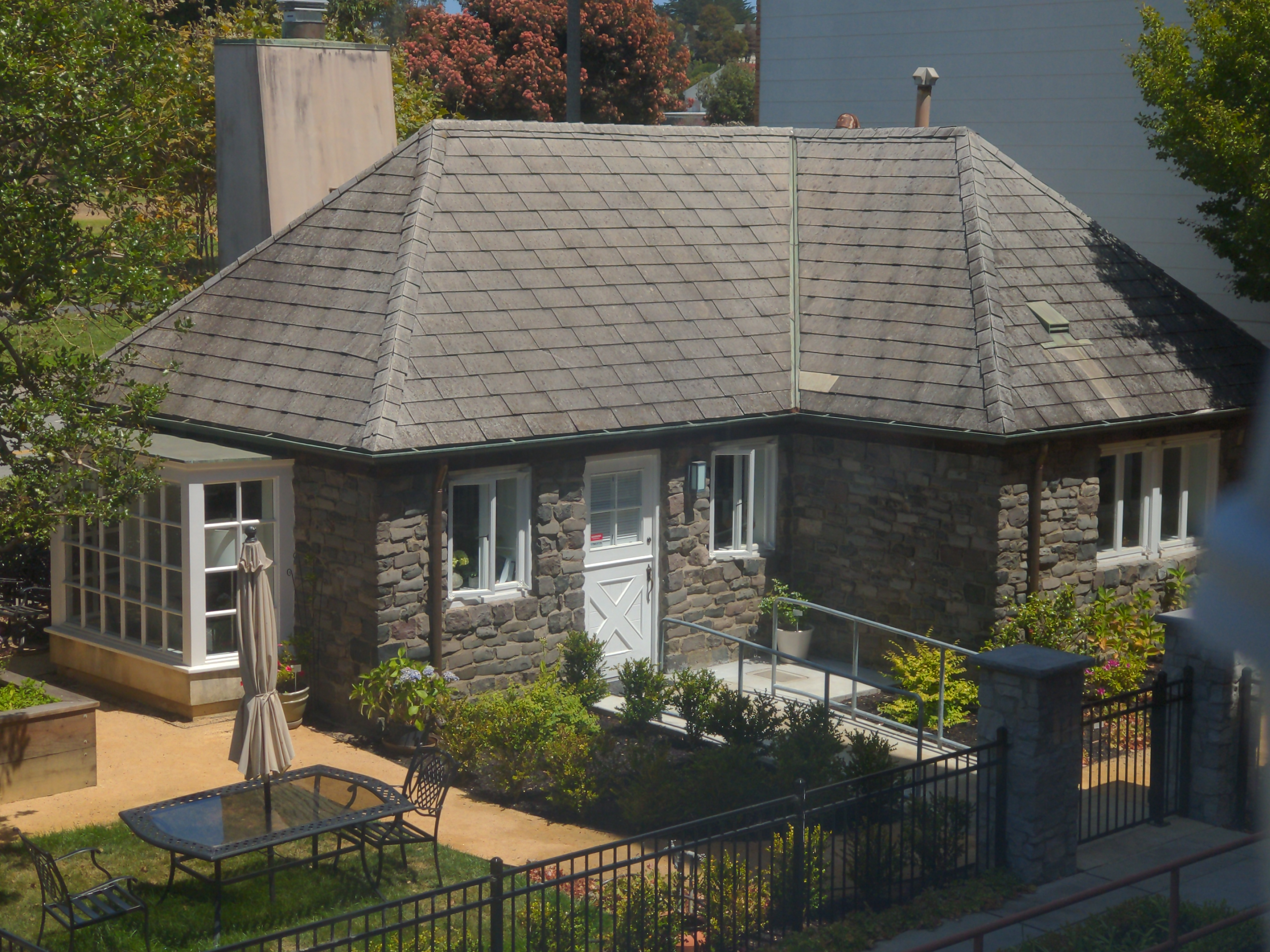
The "Cottage" – an ancillary building on the premises of Heritage on the Marina

In 1922, the San Francisco Ladies Protection and Relief Society accepted the donation from Mrs Kate F. Austin of the parcel of land surrounded by Francisco, Bay, Laguna, and Octavia. Previously, the site had been part of the 1915 Panama–Pacific International Exposition. Rather than constructing a new orphanage, they decided to rededicate the Society to “the care of elderly women and convalescent women and children.” By February 1923, the Society had viewed sketches prepared by Julia Morgan, the architect of the Hearst Castle, Mills College, the Fairmont Hotel, and well known for earthquake-resistant structures. The project had a budget of $150,000.

On March 3, 1925, the Society held its first meeting in the front parlor of the new Jacobean revival structure at 3400 Laguna Street. Constructed from reinforced concrete and faced with red brick with inset matt-glazed terracotta panels, the building was designed to withstand earthquakes. The project was completed under the budget by $28,000.

=== Crocker Old People's Home (1884–1957) ===
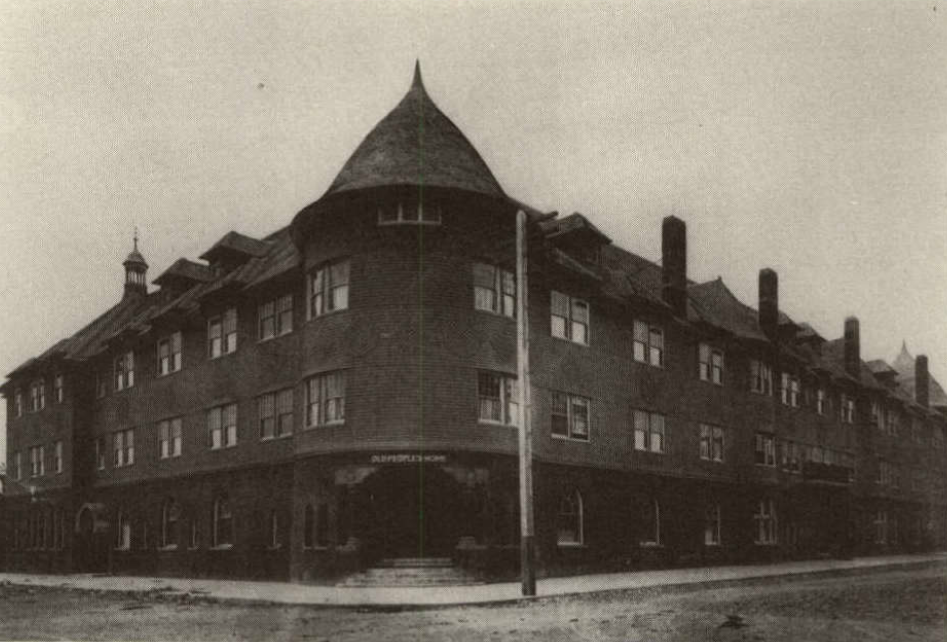
The Crocker Old People's Home, exterior

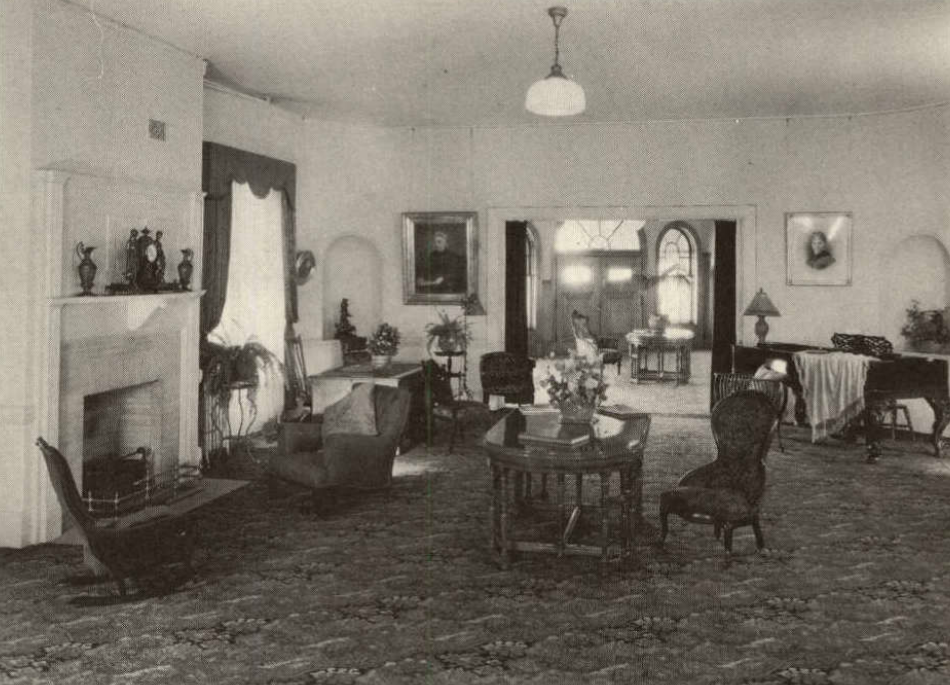
The Crocker Old People's Home, interior

Mary Ann Deming Crocker (1827–1889) commissioned American architect A. Page Brown (1859–1896) to design a mausoleum at Mountain View Cemetery for her deceased husband, the railroad magnate Charles Crocker (1822–1888), and an Old People's Home for a site at 2507 Pine Street in Lower Pacific Heights. The Bay Area architect, Willis Polk (1867–1924), came to San Francisco, to work for Brown on these two formative commissions.

This building still exists and is known as "Rose Court."

In 1957, the Crocker Old People's Home merged with the San Francisco Ladies Protection and Relief Society. That November, sixty-seven former residents of 2507 Pine Street moved to 3400 Laguna Street.

=== The "Old Brown Ark" (1863–1925) ===
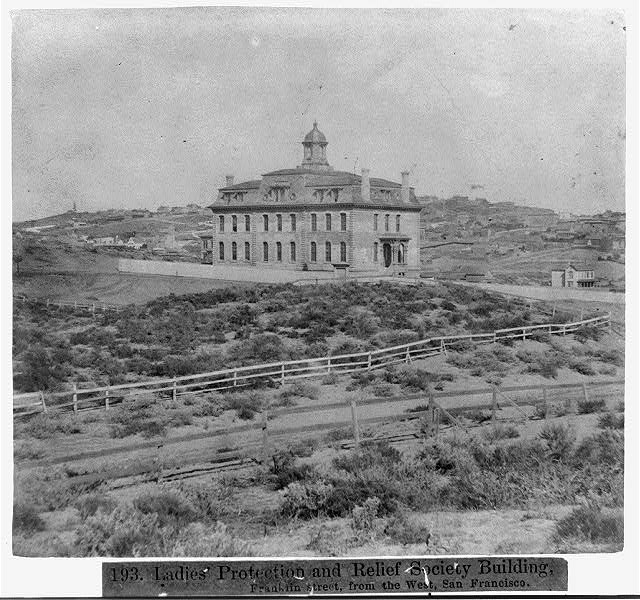
1866 The "Old Brown Ark", San Francisco, West Side

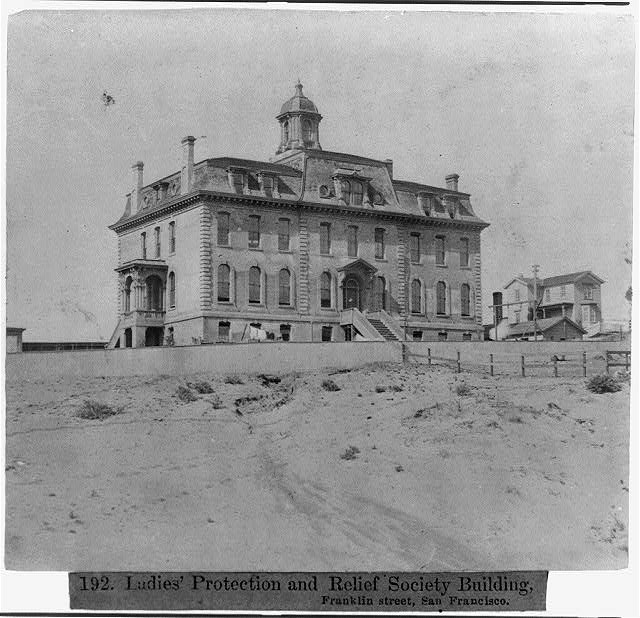
1884 The "Old Brown Ark", San Francisco, East Side

The premises of the first dedicated care home of the San Francisco Ladies Protection and Relief Society (from 1863 to 1925) were situated between Van Ness, Franklin, Geary, and Post Streets on land donated by Horace May Hawes and designed by S. C. Bugbee & Son. The Franklin Street house, which came to be known affectionately as the “Old Brown Ark”, was "primarily used as an orphanage but also housed indigent mothers and elderly women". A new wing was added in 1898. After being the site of the Jack Tar Hotel for many years, is now the site of the California Pacific Medical Center.

Note on front of photo taken in 1884: "Commenced Oct. 1, 1863; completed Apr. 20, 1864; total cost $23,000."

In 1915, William Slingerland, PhD reported:

Brick and frame building, mostly faced with cement, three stories, modern conveniences, but structure old-fashioned and not adapted to modern use. An institution of very great possibilities, largely unrealized. Need new building and modern methods.

Main statistics for year ending December 31, 1913:

- Value of plant $100,000
- Amount of endowment $350,000
- Capacity 135
- Regular employees 21
- Average children in care 100
- Annual maintenance $24,850
- Average expense per capita $249

=== Earlier premises ===
Other addresses in San Francisco used by the Society included 151 Sacramento Street, a building on a corner of 2nd and Tehama Streets and a block bounded by McAllister, Fulton, Stanton and Willard Streets.

== Awards and recognition ==
The following items are on display in the Morgan Parlor of the Julia Morgan Building.

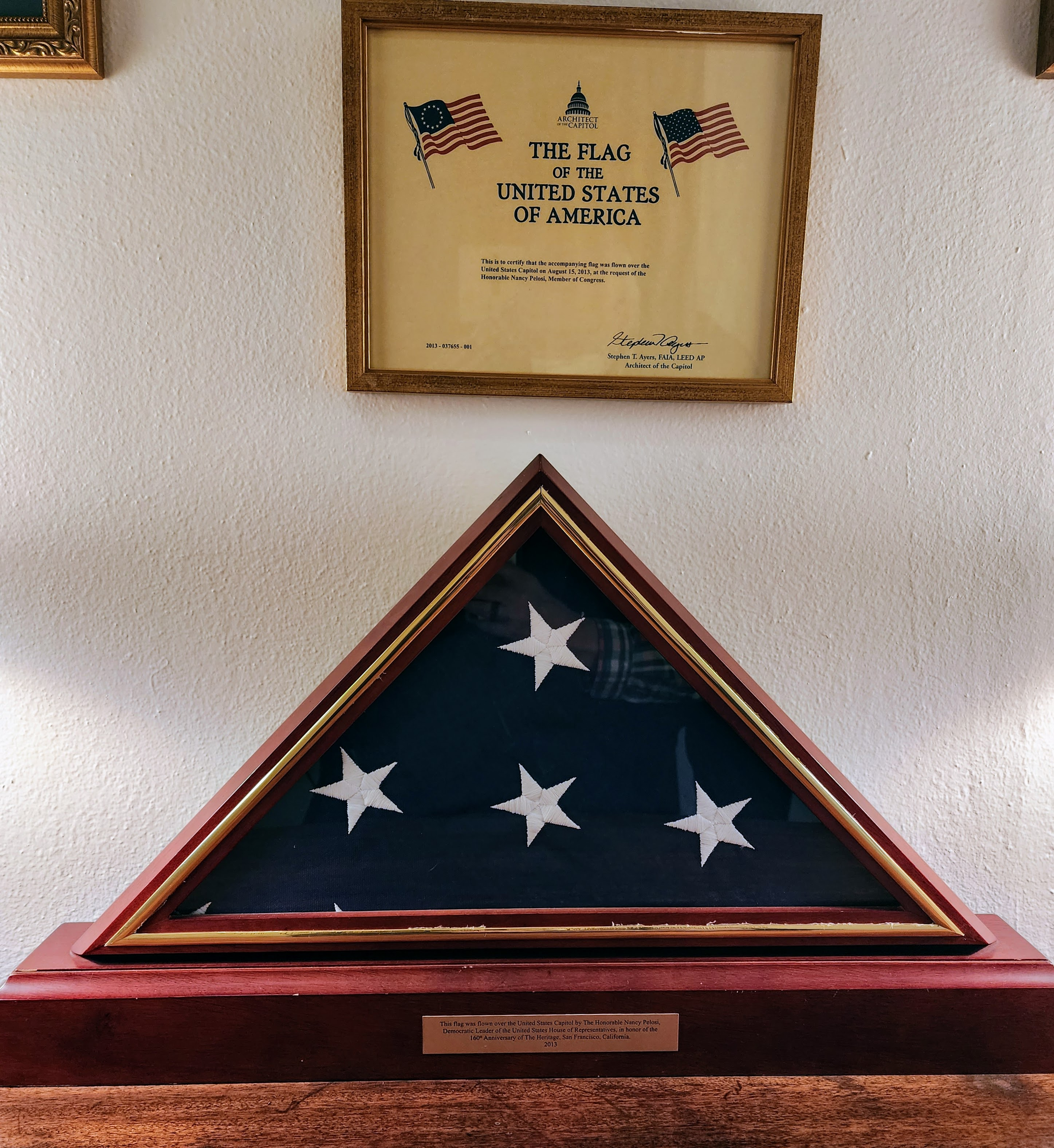
US Flag that flew over the Capitol presented by Member of Congress Nancy Pelosi to The Heritage

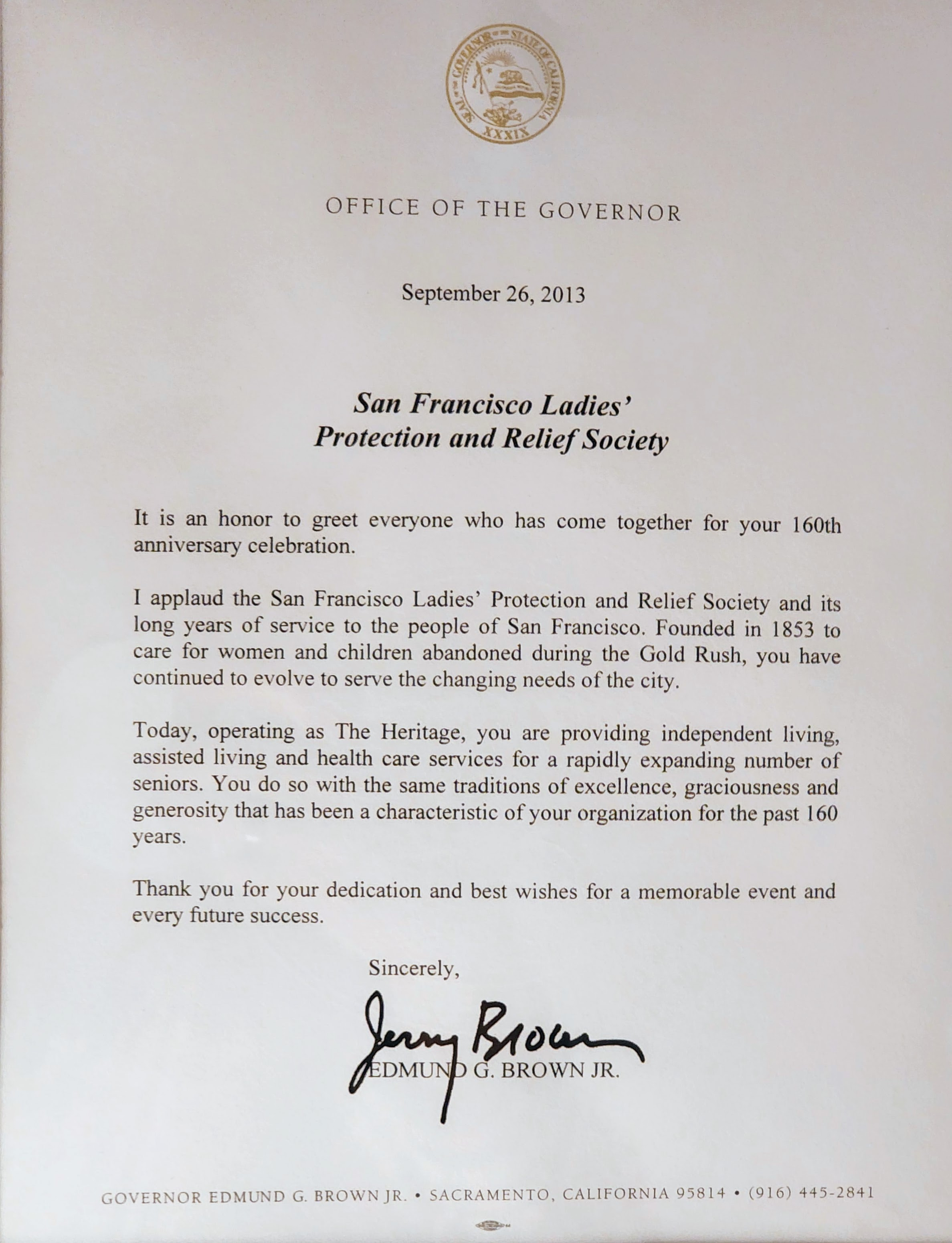
Letter from Governor Edmund Brown to The Heritage, September 2, 2013

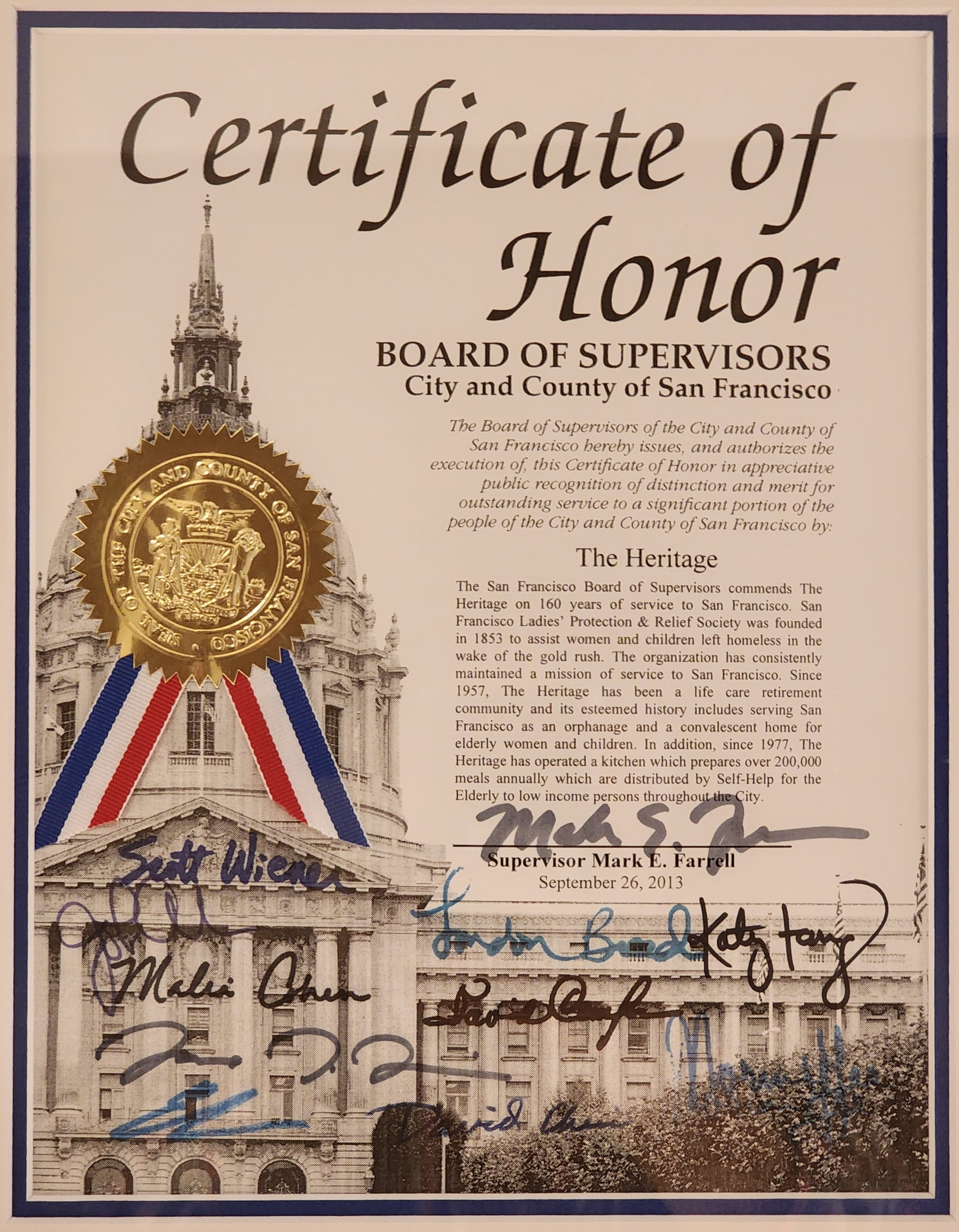
San Francisco Board of Supervisors Certificate of Honor presented to the Heritage

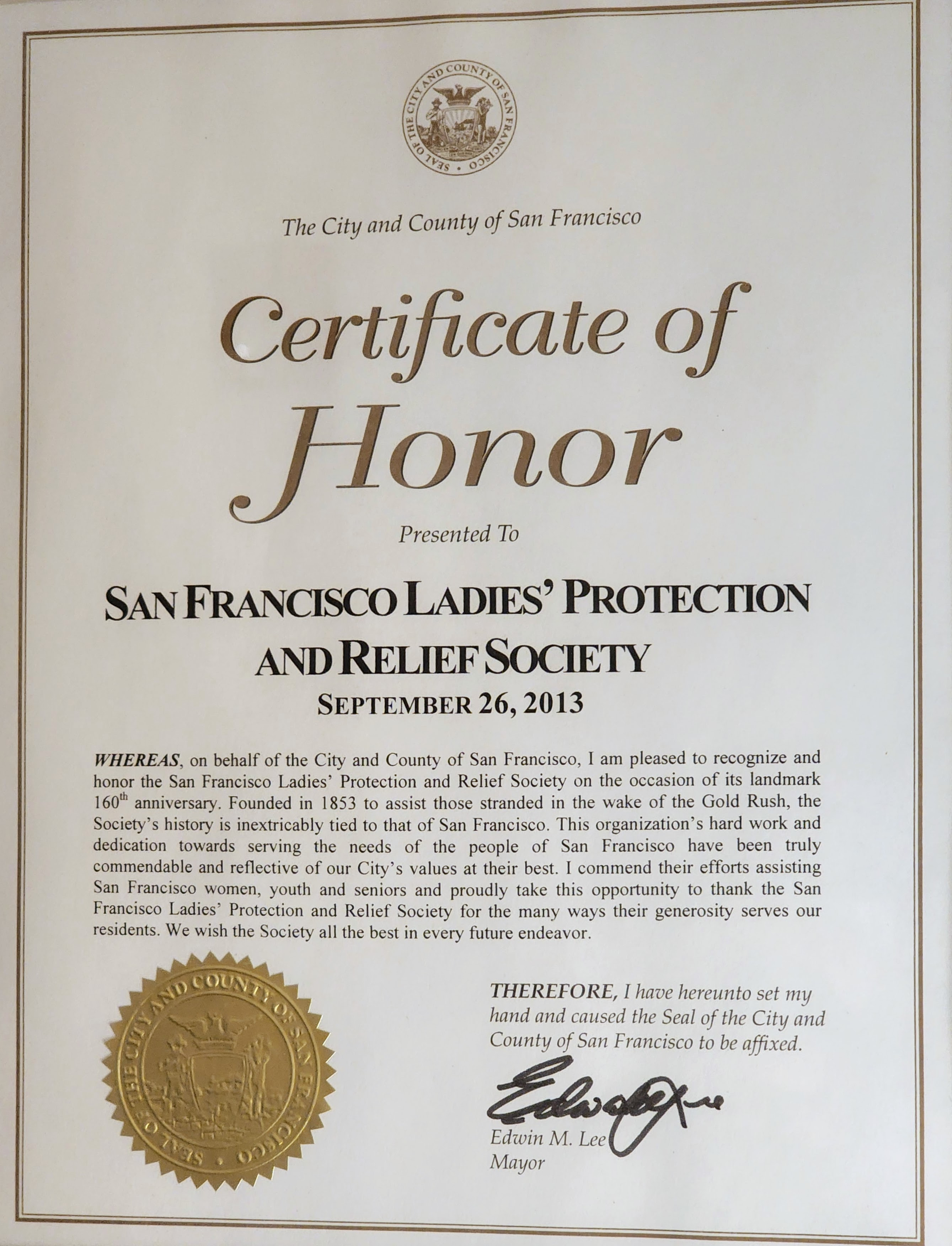
San Francisco Mayor Edwin Lee Certificate of Honor for The Heritage

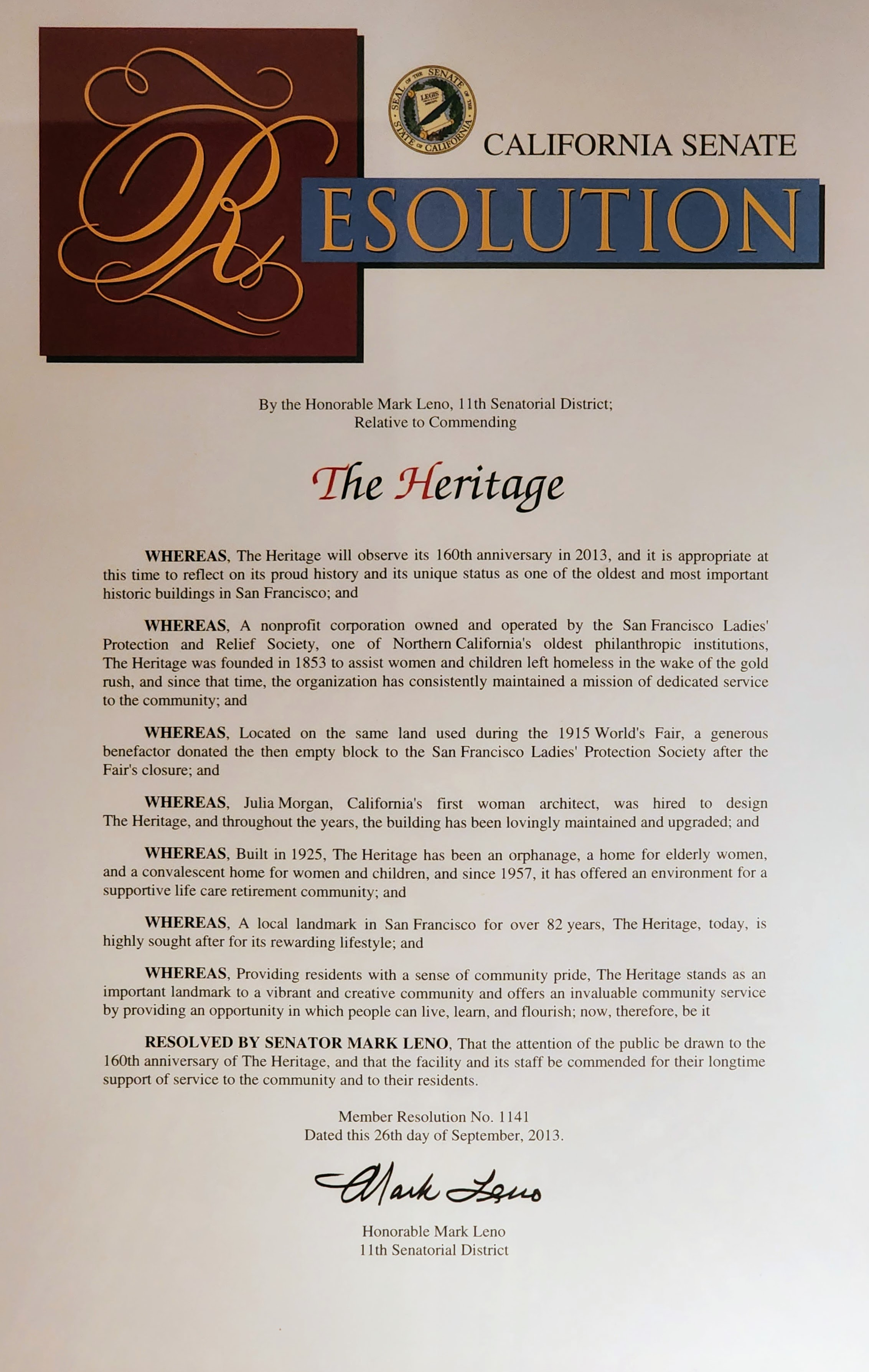
California Senate Resolution #1141 honoring The Heritage

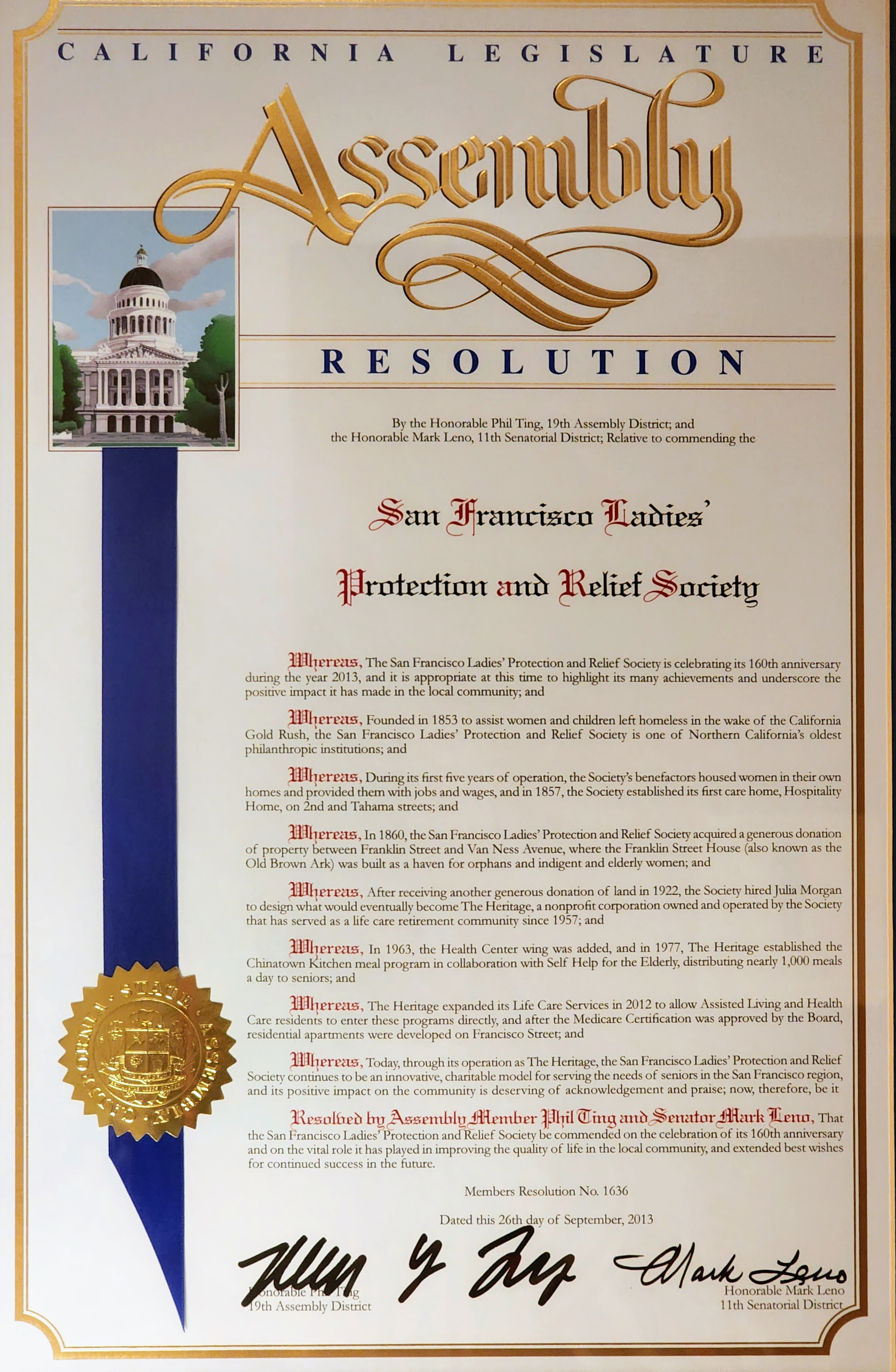
California Assembly Resolution to The Heritage #1141 2013-09-13

== Notable benefactor ==
- Phoebe Hearst, philanthropist, feminist and suffragist
- James Lick, real estate investor, carpenter, piano builder, land baron, and patron of the sciences
- John McLaren, superintendent of the Golden Gate Park in San Francisco

== Architects ==
- Gardner Dailey (1895–1967), architect and one of two figures who "introduced modern architecture to Northern California"
- Hewitt C. Wells (1915–1989), architect who designed buildings in San Francisco, California and Nevada
- Julia Morgan (1872–1957), architect, best known for her work on Hearst Castle in San Simeon, California

== Notable residents ==
- Bob Fouts, American sportscaster best known as a play-by-play announcer for San Francisco 49ers football
- Arlene Francis, actress, radio and television talk show host, and What's My Line? game show panelist
- Albert R. Jonsen, founder of the field of bioethics, President University of San Francisco
- Harold Levine, American mathematician, Stanford University professor
- Bernard Mayes, British broadcaster, university dean and author, founded KQED-FM and America's first Crisis hotlines
- Marty Nolan, Pulitzer Prize reporter
- Mary Tape, desegregation activist who fought for Chinese-Americans' access to education

== See also ==
- Aging in place
- Jack Tar Hotel
- Marina District, San Francisco
- Panama–Pacific International Exposition
- Tape v. Hurley
- Home for Aged and Infirm Colored People of California
