= European medieval architecture in North America =

Anachronism in architecture

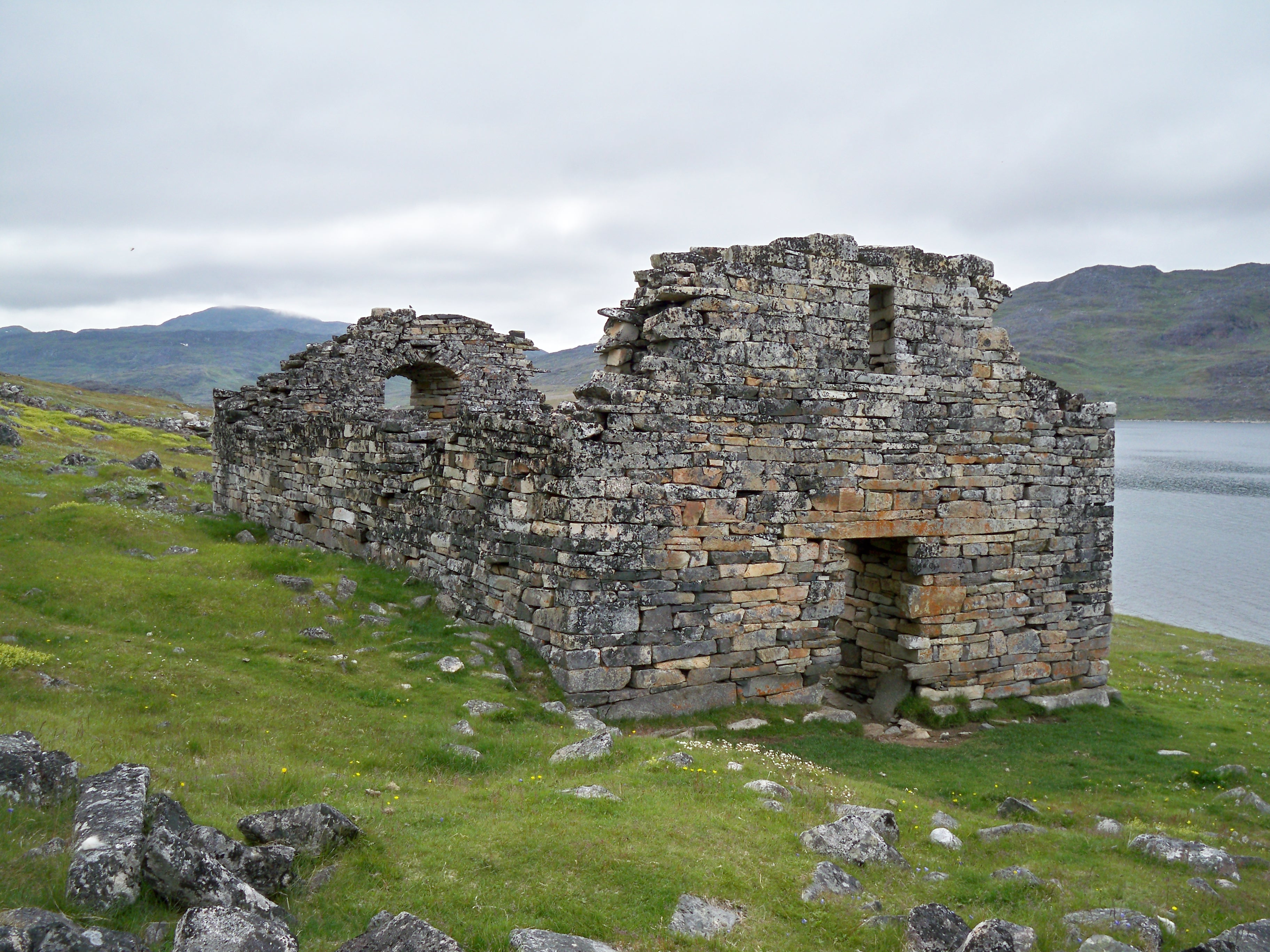
The ruins of the Hvalsey Church in Greenland.

Medieval architecture in North America is an anachronism. Some structures in North America can however be classified as medieval, either by age or origin. Most of these were disassembled in Europe and reconstructed in whole or in part in North America. Often these are museums or museum exhibits. In rare cases these structures are seen as evidence of pre-Columbian trans-oceanic contact. Although much of this is pseudoscience, these buildings are of interest to American scholars of medieval architecture.

== Pre-Columbian buildings ==
- L'Anse aux Meadows, a Norse settlement in Newfoundland. Foundations of eight structures, visible today only as mounds because they were reburied in a conservation effort. Includes modern reconstructions.
- Church of Hvalsey, a Norse church in Greenland. Additional remains of Norse-era settlements.

== Transported buildings ==
Medieval building that have been transported to North America in modern times.

- The Cloisters museum, New York City, a branch of the Metropolitan Museum of Art housed in a complex integrating elements from several different medieval structures
- St. Bernard de Clairvaux Church, a 12th-century cloister from Spain, reassembled in Florida
- Elements of a 12th-century cloister from Saint-Génis-des-Fontaines Abbey, a Romanesque portal, and a 15th-century chapel in the Philadelphia Museum of Art
- Part of a Romanesque cloister in the Toledo Museum of Art, Ohio
- Chapel of St Martin de Sayssuel, (St. Joan of Arc Chapel), Marquette University, Milwaukee, Wisconsin
- Agecroft Hall, Richmond, Virginia
- Chapterhouse of the Abbey of María de Óvila, under reconstruction at the Abbey of New Clairvaux, Vina, California
- A 1524 sidechapel from France in the Detroit Institute of Arts
- A 14th century cloister from France in the Nelson-Atkins Museum of Art
- Parts of Hearst Castle in San Simeon, California
- Parts of Hammond Castle, Gloucester, Massachusetts
- A 12th century chapter house from France in the Worcester Art Museum, Worcester, Massachusetts

Other later period buildings were also transported like the Cotswold Cottage, built in the early 17th century in Chedworth, Gloucestershire, England, now in The Henry Ford museum in Dearborn, Michigan. The Church of St. Mary the Virgin, Aldermanbury, London, which was designed by Sir Christopher Wren in 1677 is now the National Churchill Museum in Fulton, Missouri. It includes a spiral staircase which probably dates to the 12th century.

== Gothic Revival ==
In the 19th century, a movement to recreate medieval architecture reached the Americas, the Gothic Revival. Neo-Gothic styles buildings were erected, bringing more medieval architecture into the United States. Not all architects were true to the original design and style. The traditional Lancet arch and triforium found in medieval churches was combined, in some instances, with modern technology to create buildings like the Tribune Tower, a skyscraper in Chicago.
