= Loyzaga =

Loyzaga is a Spanish surname. Notable people with the surname include:

- Bing Loyzaga (born 1970), Filipino actress
- Carlos Loyzaga (1930–2016), Filipino basketball player and coach
- Chito Loyzaga (born 1958), Filipino basketball player
- Diego Loyzaga (born 1995), Filipino actor
- Joaquín Loyzaga, Filipino footballer
- Joey Loyzaga (born 1961), Filipino basketball player
- Jorge Loyzaga, Mexican architect
- Pablo de Loyzaga, Spanish sculptor
