= Abbey of New Clairvaux =

Trappist monastery in Vina, California

Coordinates: 39.934644°N 122.060606°W

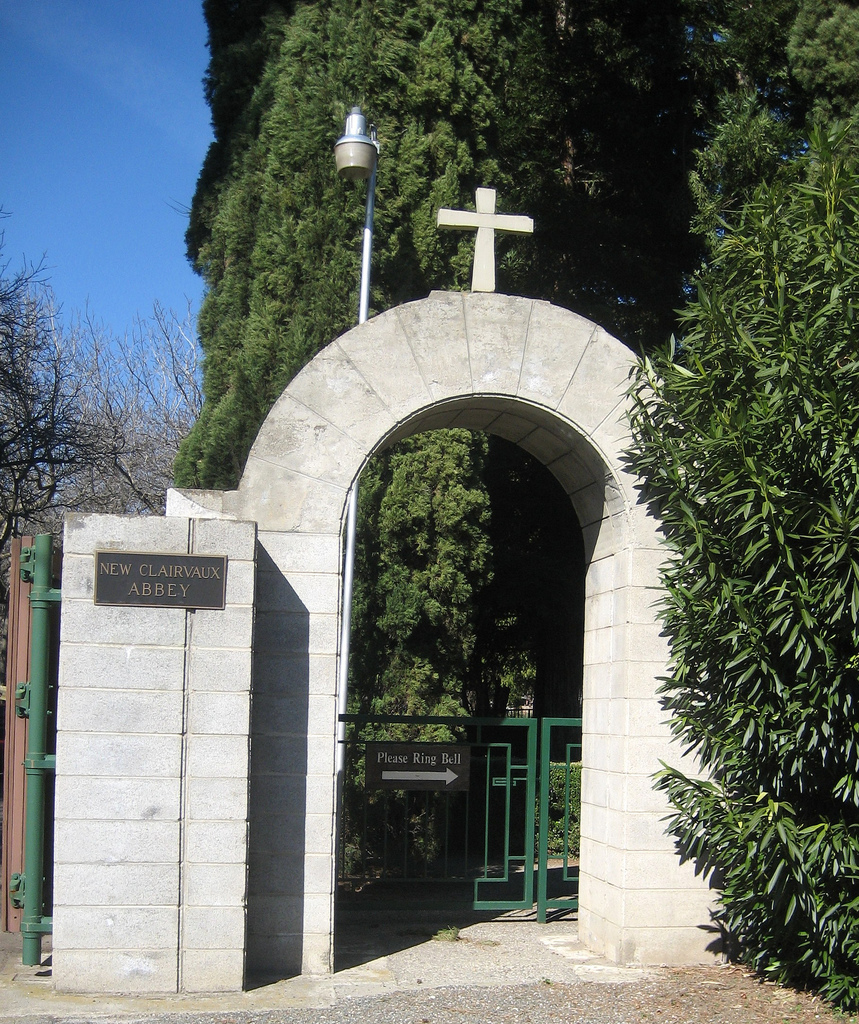
Entrance to New Clairvaux Abbey

The Abbey of New Clairvaux is a rural Trappist monastery located in Northern California in the small town of Vina in Tehama County. The farmland, once owned by Leland Stanford, grows prunes, walnuts, and grapes that the monks harvest from the orchards and vineyards to sustain the community.

== History and daily life ==
The Abbey was established in 1955 when monks from the Abbey of Gethsemani sought to begin a foundation in California. The monks live an austere contemplative life of penance and prayer on behalf of the reparation of sins. Their order is called Cistercians of the Strict Observance.

The setting is extremely quiet and the monastery is completely hidden behind a wall that separates the guest and extern quarters and the monastic enclosure. There is very little interaction between the monks and retreatants. Guests are welcome to join the monks in the chapel to chant the Divine Office seven times per day, beginning with Vigil at 3:30 a.m. and ending with Compline at 7:35 p.m.

California Governor Jerry Brown is known to visit the Abbey. In 2009 Brown visited at the monastery before announcing his candidacy for California Governor.

From 1980 to 2013, the number of members of the abbey decreased from 35 to 22.

== Chapter house ==
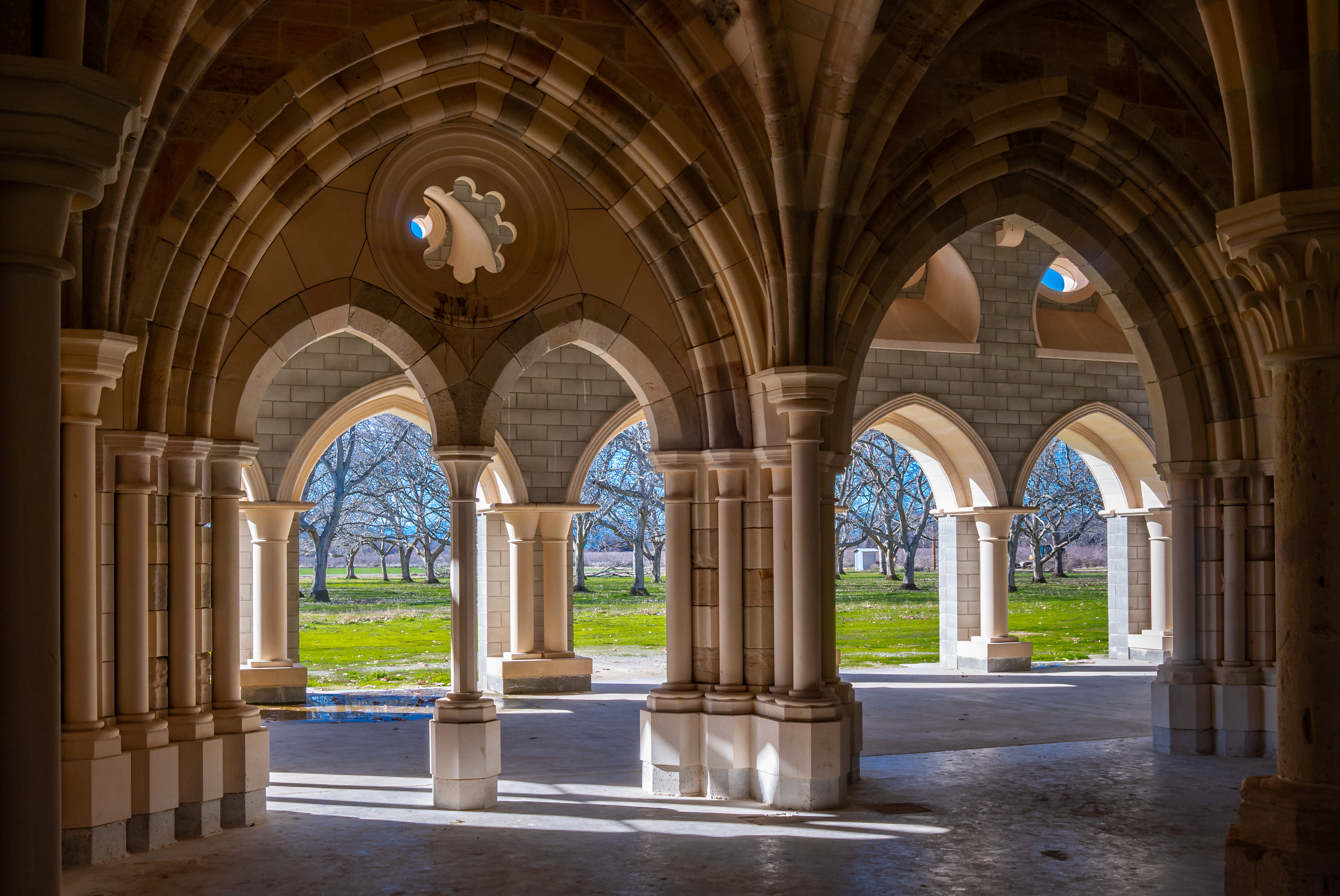
View from within the 800-year-old chapter house brought from Santa Maria de Ovila in Spain (2013).

The community reassembled what the monks call their "Sacred Stones", the limestone blocks from the 800-year-old chapter house (meeting room) of the Cistercian monastery of Santa Maria de Ovila that once stood in Trillo, Guadalajara, in Spain. William Randolph Hearst purchased the chapter house of the old Spanish monastery in 1925 for $97,000, dismantled it, and had the stones shipped to California in 1931, intending to include them in Wyntoon, a grand home he was building in remote Northern California. Instead, Hearst gave the stones to the city of San Francisco as part of an arrangement to abate taxes that he owed. The stones sat in San Francisco's Golden Gate park for decades. In 1955, Father Thomas Davis, abbot of the newly-founded abbey of New Clairvaux, noticed the stones in the park. From 1979 to 1983, the art historian Margaret Burke studied the stones to plan an eventual restoration project. Father Thomas Davis eventually made a deal with the city to get the 1,300 leftover stones and handle the reconstruction of the church.

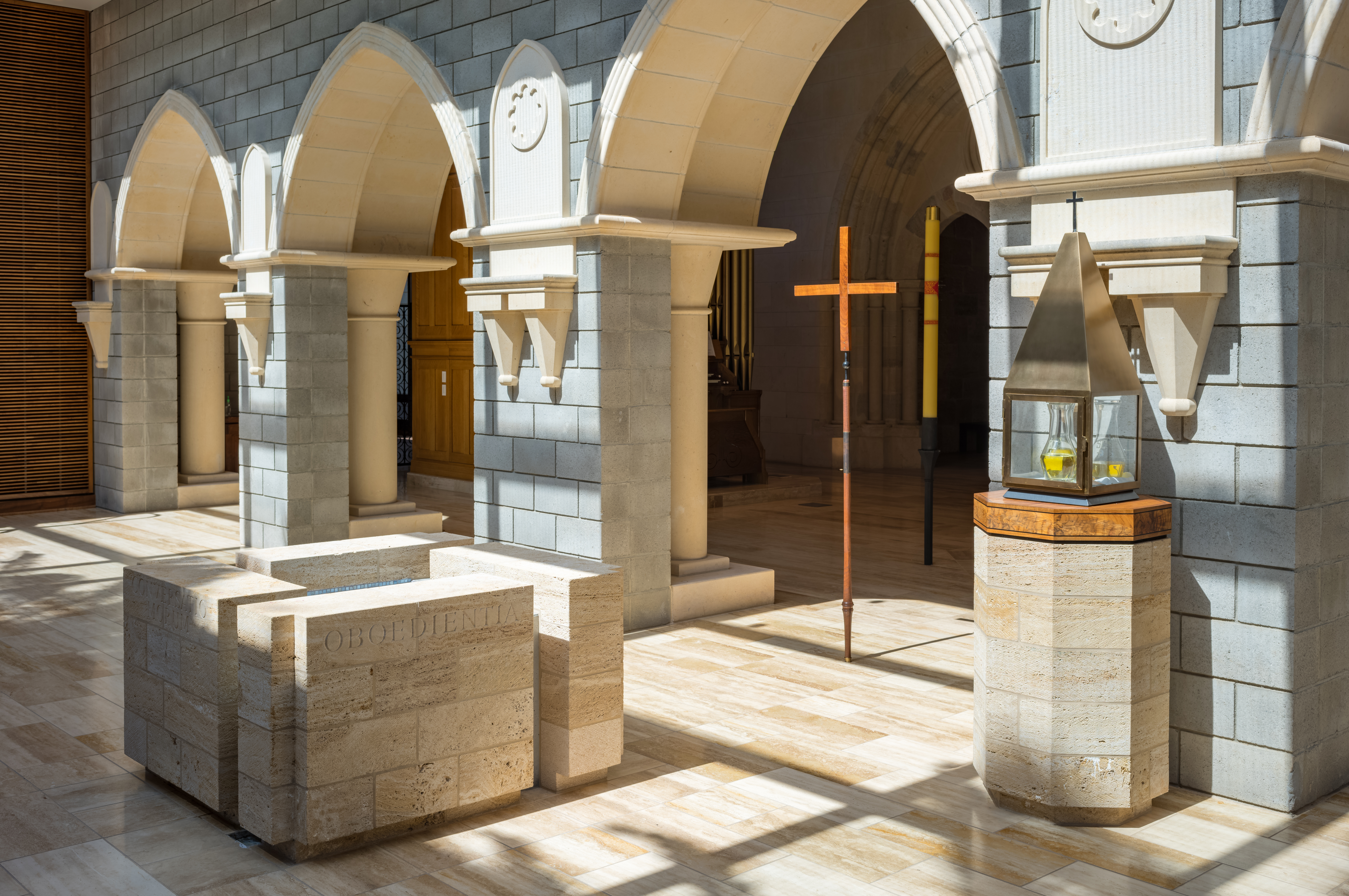
The interior of the church in 2023

In 1994, the stones were given to the abbey. In 2004, after raising $7 million in~funds, the construction of the chapter house began outside the cloister of the Abbey of New Clairvaux. In October 2008, the ancient chapter house's Gothic portal was completed. In 2009, construction on the interior of the chapter house began with Gothic columns rising to their capitals. The 2010 Sierra Nevada Brewing Company partnership helped the abbey finance this project. Additional limestones from Texas were purchased to complete the plans.

The construction finished in December 2017. 65% of the stones were originals, 35% were imported from Texas (because of chemical compatibility and color correspondence). The new building was dedicated in July 2018. 7 prayer services are held every day.

== Wine ==
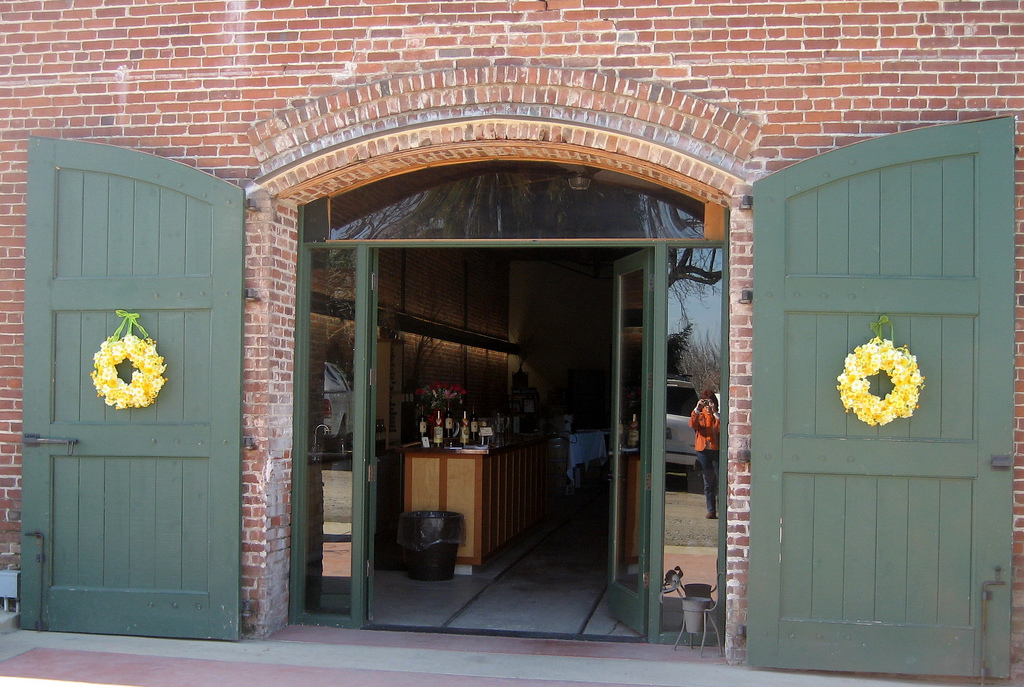
Entrance to wine tasting room

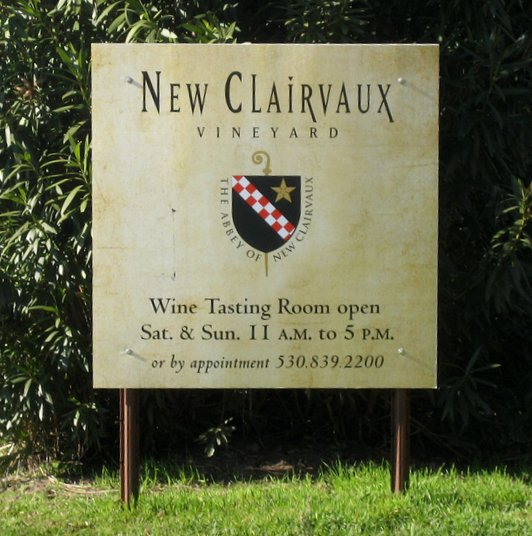
Wine tasting sign outside the Abbey

Leland Stanford had a vineyard on the property as far back as 1881, and Stanford's winery building still stands on the grounds. In 2000, the New Clairvaux Vineyard was planted. The monastery began to sell its wine in 2005.

In 2011, the abbey planted the Greek varieties assyrtiko and moschofilero (quarter-acre each) alongside its tempranillo, albariño and syrah. The cuttings of those Greek varieties were imported in the USA in 1948 by Harold Olmo, grape breeder at the University of California, Davis, where they were stored until the abbey of New Clairvaux took interest in the 2000s.

== Beer ==
In 2010, Sierra Nevada Brewing Company partnered with the Abbey, with the monastery beginning production of Trappist-style beers in 2011. The Abbey has not yet been sanctioned by the International Trappist Association, and therefore will not be brewing official Trappist beer. Several dubbel, tripel, and quadrupel Abbey beers are produced under the Ovila label.
