= Francisco Serrano =

Francisco Serrano may refer to:

- St. Francis Serrano (died 1748), Dominican priest martyred in China
- Francisco Serrano, 1st Duke of la Torre (1810–1885), Spanish marshal and statesman
- Francisco R. Serrano (1886–1927), Mexican general and politician
- Francisco Layna Serrano (1893–1971), Spanish doctor and historian
- Francisco J. Serrano (1900–1982), Mexican civil engineer and architect
- J. Francisco Serrano Cacho (born 1937), his son, Mexican architect
- Francisco Serrano (poet) (born 1949), Mexican poet and writer
- Francisco Serrano (Spanish politician) (born 1965), Spanish judge and politician
- Carlos Francisco Serrano (born 1978), Colombian footballer
- Francisco Serrano (triathlete) (born 1980), Mexican triathlete
