= Santa María de Óvila =

Former 12th-century Cistercian monastery in Trillo, Spain

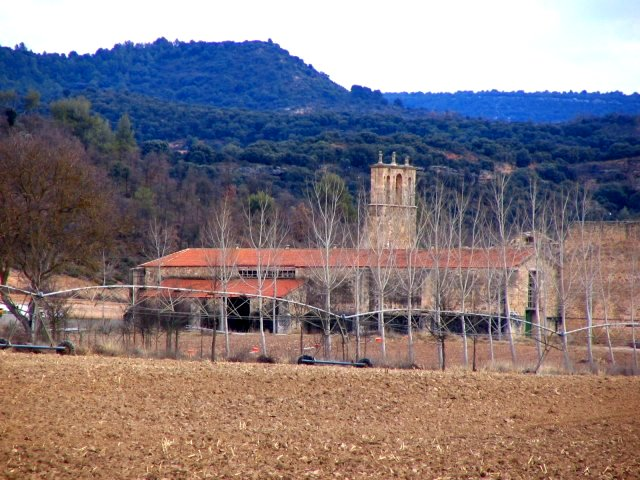
- The ruins of Santa María de Óvila in Spain, shown more than 75 years after the most striking architectural features were removed by agents of William Randolph Hearst

- Location within Spain

Religion
- Affiliation: Roman Catholic Church
- Ecclesiastical or organisational status: Abbey
- Year consecrated: 1213
- Status: Abandoned

Location
- Location: Trillo, Guadalajara, Spain
- Coordinates: 40.7008°N 2.5572°W

Architecture
- Type: Monastery, Church
- Style: Gothic, Renaissance
- Groundbreaking: 1181
- Completed: 1213
- Spanish Cultural Heritage
- Official name: Monasterio de Santa María Óvila
- Type: Monument
- Designated: 4 June 1931
- Reference no.: (R.I.)-51-0000612-00000

Santa María de Óvila is a former Cistercian monastery built in Spain beginning in 1181 on the Tagus River near Trillo, Guadalajara, about 90 miles (140 km) northeast of Madrid. In 1835 it was confiscated by the Spanish government and sold to private owners.

American publisher William Randolph Hearst bought parts of the monastery in 1931 with the intention of using its stones in the construction of a grand and fanciful castle at Wyntoon, California, but after some 10,000 stones were removed and shipped, they were abandoned in San Francisco for decades. These stones are now in various locations around California: the old church portal was erected at the University of San Francisco, and the chapter house was reassembled by Trappist monks at the Abbey of New Clairvaux in Vina, California. Other stones are serving as simple decorative elements in Golden Gate Park's botanical garden.

In Spain, the new government of the Second Republic declared the monastery a National Monument in June 1931, but not in time to prevent the mass removal of stones. Today, the remnant buildings and walls stand on private farmland.

== History ==
=== Foundation ===
The monastery of Santa María de Óvila was founded in 1175 by a grant of land from King Alfonso VIII of Castile to the Cistercian monks of Valbuena Abbey in Valbuena de Duero, Valladolid Province, Castile-León, Spain. In this endeavor, the king was following a general strategy of establishing Catholic institutions on land he had recently won in battle from the Moors of Iberia. The Cistercian "white monks" (wearing undyed habits) first chose a site in Murel (now called Carrascosa de Tajo) on the Tagus, but after a few years, had to relocate to more fertile zone a few miles nearer to Trillo, Guadalajara, where a flat hilltop by the river commanded a modest view.

The construction began in 1181. The monastic quarters and the church were built over the following three decades. The central cloister was bordered on the north by the church, on the west by a barrel-vaulted great nave, on the east by the sacristy, the priory cell, and the chapter house, and on the south by the kitchen, the pantry and the refectory (dining hall). Some of the buildings were given seven-foot-thick (2 m) walls with slit windows, to serve as a refuge in case the Moors returned to the area. The church was built in the shape of a Latin cross with a nave divided into four sections, and a sanctuary with three square apses. Its presbytery had a central square topped by a pentagon.

In 1191, the king confirmed the monastery and its surrounding fields as belonging to the Cistercian Order. The aged abbot of Santa María de Huerta, bishop Martín de Finojosa (later canonized), consecrated the church in September 1213 and died days later. The surrounding area of Murel and Trillo along the Tagus prospered, giving tithes and gifts of land to the monastery. The cartulary, Cartulario de Óvila, is preserved at the University of Madrid.

The first buildings were completed in the Gothic style, including the church. The refectory (dining hall) shows an architectural style in transition between earlier Romanesque and contemporary Gothic. A fine High Gothic chapter house was built of best quality hard limestone. The church was rebuilt sometime before 1650 in a late Gothic style with a prominent vaulted ceiling. The cloister was rebuilt around 1617, and is of a simple design with little adornment surrounding a High Renaissance arcade. The final phase of building took place around 1650, with a new doorway for the church, completed in late Renaissance and Plateresque style full of detail. Because of its prosperity and the multiple expansion projects, Santa María de Óvila exhibited examples of every Spanish religious architectural style used from 1200 to 1600. However, even at its height, Óvila remained one of the smallest Cistercian monasteries in the region of Castile.

=== Decline ===
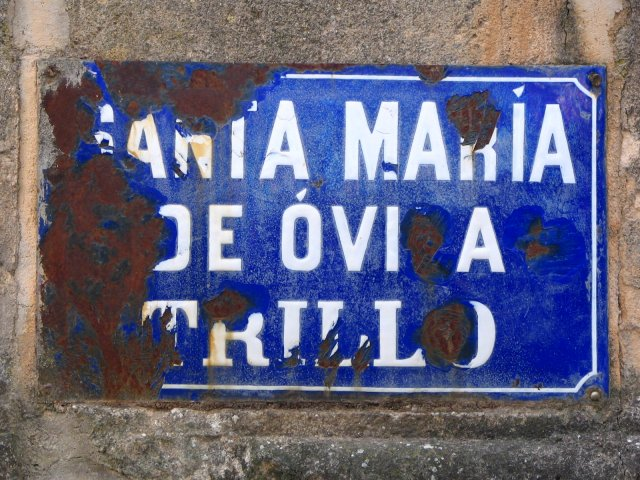
Enameled monastery sign shows damage

From the 15th century, changes to the areas surrounding Santa María de Óvila initiated a slow decline. Civil wars depopulated the villages of the upper Tagus valley. The monastery's land holdings passed one by one into the hands of the new regional aristocracy: first the Count of Cifuentes, followed by Rui Gomes da Silva, Duke of Pastrana, and the Spanish Army. Neighbors looted more lands.

A fire destroyed part of the monastery during the War of the Spanish Succession. During the Peninsular War, French troops looted the buildings and used them as barracks. The monks were forced to leave in 1820 because of confiscations by a new liberal government, but they returned in 1823 after King Ferdinand VII restored conservative institutions. However, the nearby villagers denied support to the monastery despite its protection by the king. The monastery ceased to operate in 1835: the Ecclesiastical Confiscations of Mendizábal enforced a law declaring that minor religious holdings housing fewer than 12 residents were to be forfeit to the state; the monastery had only four monks and one lay brother, who were cast out.

=== Vacancy ===
After the Confiscations, many of the furnishings and artistic treasures of Santa María de Óvila passed to the surrounding parish churches, especially Ruguilla, Huet, Sotoca de Tajo and Carrascosa de Tajo. Other valuables, such as books and historic documents, were stolen and sold. The remaining contents were auctioned, including wine-making equipment and an oxcart. The precious 328-pages cartulary of the monastery (Spanish: libro tumbo de Santa María de Óvila) went to a private owner but was donated in 1925 to the Monastery of Santa María la Real of Oseira. The thick manuscript holds copies of royal privileges granted to the monastery throughout its history, as well as the Abadologio, a comprehensive and thorough history of the Cistercian abbots and monks who lived in the monastery, which was written from March 1729 to February 1730 by Father Gerofeo, a Cistercian monk of the monastery of Valparaíso (Zámora).

The new owners of Santa María de Óvila were well-to-do farmers who cared little for the buildings. For a brief time, the former monastery was used as a hostel, but mainly, the buildings were subjected to hard agricultural use as barns sheltering livestock. The chapter house served as a manure pit. Other buildings were used as storage. In the early 20th century small trees were seen to be growing in the dirt packed atop the monastery roofs—the protective roof tiles had long since been taken down and sold.

=== Removal to California ===
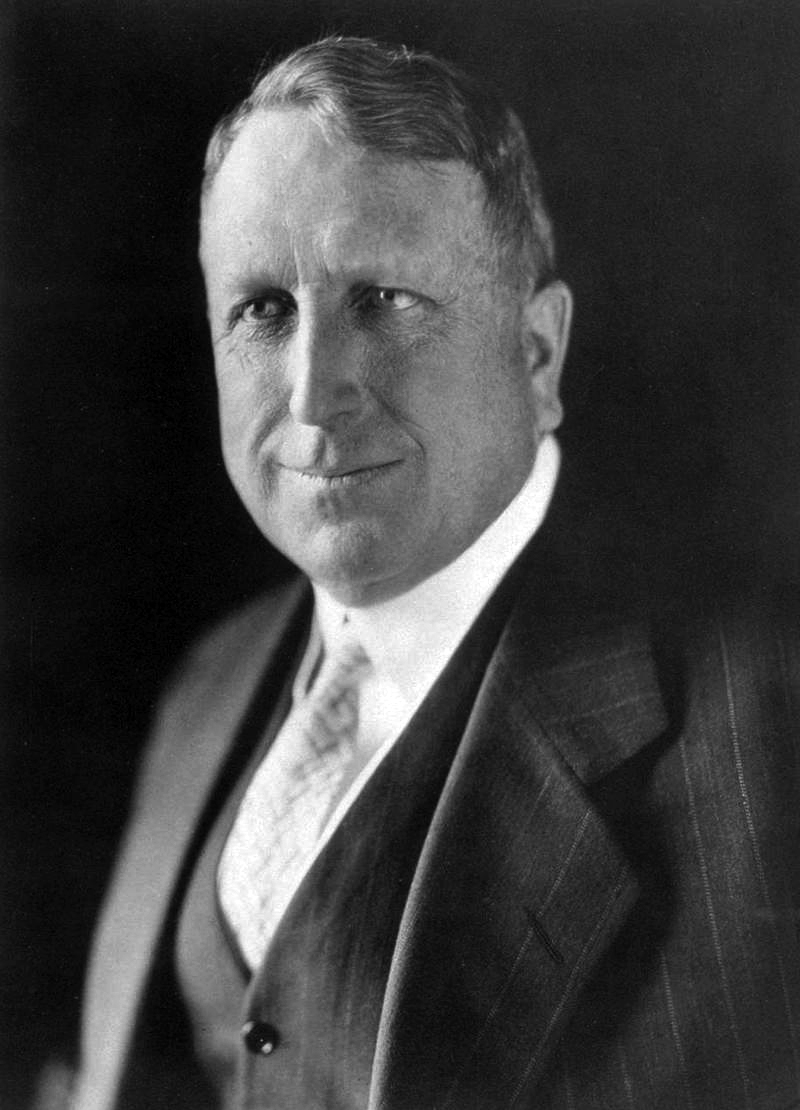
William Randolph Hearst spent roughly $1 million to obtain the monastery's finest features.

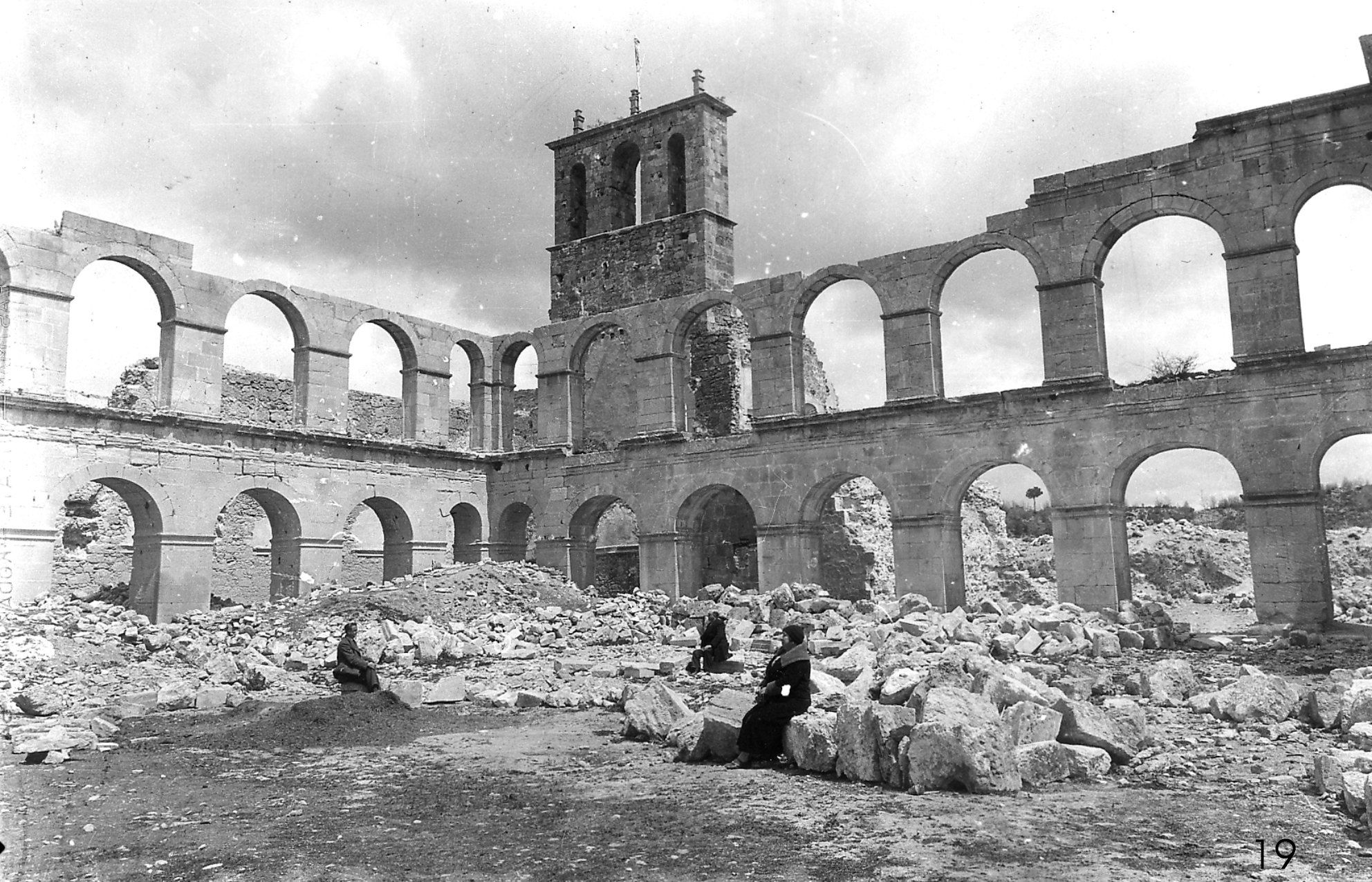
Dismantled cloister of the abbey in the 1930s

In 1928, the Spanish state sold the monastery to Fernando Beloso for a little more than 3,100 pesetas, roughly $600 to $700 at the time. Beloso, director of the Spanish Credit Bank in Madrid, was the owner of Coto de San Bernardo in Óvila, which included expansive irrigated grain fields and forests surrounding the monastery.

Arthur Byne, an art agent living in Madrid, whose biggest client was American newspaper magnate William Randolph Hearst, was working for Hearst to acquire an old monastery in 1930. In 1925, Byne had bought Hearst the monastery of Santa María la Real de Sacramenia which was dismantled, crated and shipped to New York where it was stored in a warehouse in the Bronx. (In 1954 it was re-assembled in Florida as a tourist attraction, and was subsequently acquired by the Episcopal Diocese of South Florida and called the St. Bernard de Clairvaux Church.) Byne signaled Beloso to help him locate one; Beloso invited him to see the old Óvila monastery in December 1930, and Byne subsequently sent photographs and sketches to Hearst for approval. Byne listed specific elements, mostly architectural details, to be removed, such as vault ribs, door frames, window embrasures, columns and capitals. Some entire walls of fine facing stones were recommended for removal. He referred to the proposal as "Mountolive", possibly to misdirect the Spanish authorities who were in charge of protecting historical artifacts.

After Hearst conveyed his enthusiasm for the project, Beloso sold Byne the stones for $85,000, including the cloister, the chapter house, the refectory and the dormitory for novices. With Byne's commission, Hearst was to pay $97,000, a price roughly equivalent to $1.82 million as of 2026. Byne started immediately on the project, organizing men and materials, and beginning the removal of stones. Hearst's main architect Julia Morgan sent her associate architect Walter T. Steilberg who arrived on March 9, 1931. Steilberg recommended that Hearst buy the old church portal, which he did, at Byne's price of $1,500. Under the direction of Byne and Steilberg, the monastery was carefully labeled as it was dismantled stone by stone. Antonio Gomez, the local foreman praised by Byne and Steilberg, numbered the blocks on architectural drawings and painted the number in red on the back of each stone.

To move all the stones, Byne and Steilberg had a road built to the Tagus, and a barge attached to a fixed cable was assigned to ferry stones across. An old World War I trench railway was brought in to transport stones from the monastery to the ferry; its rails could be laid into any of the buildings. Men pushed the small rail cars along the narrow gauge tracks; the stones were then lifted into the ferry by crane, and another crane lifted them out of the ferry into trucks. One of the biggest problems that Byne encountered was that Spain's three excelsior factories could not make enough packing material to keep the crate-packing crew supplied. At one point, realizing that the stones were likely to be used in California as external cladding for structural steel walls, Steilberg suggested the facing surface of each stone be sliced to a "veneer" of the thickness of 6 inches (150 mm) for easier packing and shipping, but Hearst wanted to retain the authenticity of the full-sized stones. Byne and Steilberg judged certain walls and utility buildings worthless and left them in Spain. Steilberg returned home at the end of March.

Byne rushed the project in fear that it might be halted at any time by the authorities—Spanish law prohibited the removal of historic artifacts. However, the Spanish government was at that time in disarray and did not enforce the law. Government officials "simply looked the other way" as trucks hauled 700-year-old stones through Valencia to the docks. When King Alfonso XIII abdicated in April 1931, leaving the government in the control of the Second Republic, the new officials stopped the project. Byne's lawyer persuaded the Minister of Labor to allow the work to continue on the grounds that the project employed more than a hundred men and put money into the severely depressed economy.

Doctor Francisco Layna Serrano of nearby Ruguilla had for years tried to save the monastery but had failed to interest the government in the expensive preservation proposal. Realizing that this was his last chance to document the place as its stones were being removed, he wrote a monograph of its history and included a site plan of the layout of buildings, written from memory. As a result of his efforts, on June 3, 1931, Santa María de Óvila was listed as a National Monument of Spain, or Bien de Interés Cultural (Cultural Property). Layna Serrano published his monograph in 1932. In 1933, the monastery's historic cartulary was brought to the University of Madrid and published; the original was archived at the University of Oviedo.

By the time the dismantling was finished on July 1, 1931, some 10,000 stones weighing a total of 2,200 short tons (2,000 t) were shipped on 11 different freighters traveling through the Panama Canal to San Francisco. In 1931 currency, the monastery project had cost Hearst about one million dollars.

=== Spanish ruins ===
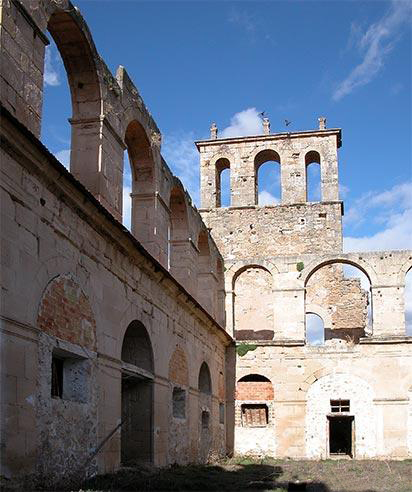
The ruins of the monastery in Spain

Today, a few buildings remain of the original monastery in Spain. These include the winery or bodega, now the oldest surviving building on the site. This was built in the 13th century during the reign of Henry I of Castile, with the upper floor built as a dormitory 27 by 90 feet (8.2 by 27.4 m) covered by a long barrel-vaulted ceiling. Outside of the bodega, crumbling walls, open yards and part of the Gothic roof of the church are visible. The double arches in the walls of the Renaissance-era cloister are still standing, but the arched roof is lost. The foundation of the church can be seen.

== California ==
=== Wyntoon ===
Hearst first bought the monastery intending to replace the family retreat at Wyntoon, on the bank of the McCloud River near Mount Shasta in remote Northern California. The original building was his mother's Bernard Maybeck-designed fantasy chalet which burned down in 1929. Hearst wanted to replace it with a great stone building fitted with towers and turrets—an eccentric castle folly that was to be larger than its predecessor. To prepare for the arrival of the Spanish stones, Morgan drew up plans with the monastery's chapter house serving as the castle's entrance hall, and the large church enclosing a swimming pool. Other stones were designated as cladding for walls and rooms on the ground floor.

At the Port of San Francisco, Steilberg inspected each shipment of stones, several thousand crates in all. The Haslett warehouse, between Fisherman's Wharf and the Hyde Street Pier, was used for storage. With groundbreaking set for July 1931 and the last freighter carrying stones still in transit, Hearst stopped his grand plan for Wyntoon because his fortunes were too far reduced from the Great Depression. The stones stayed in the warehouse, incurring annual storage fees of $15,000 in 1930s dollars.

=== Golden Gate Park ===
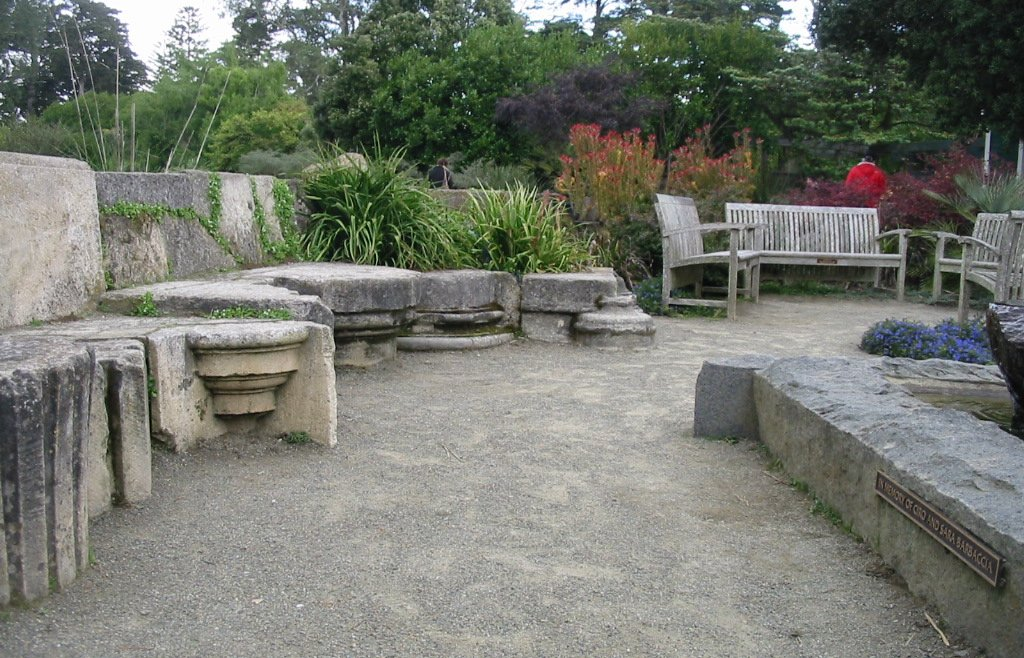
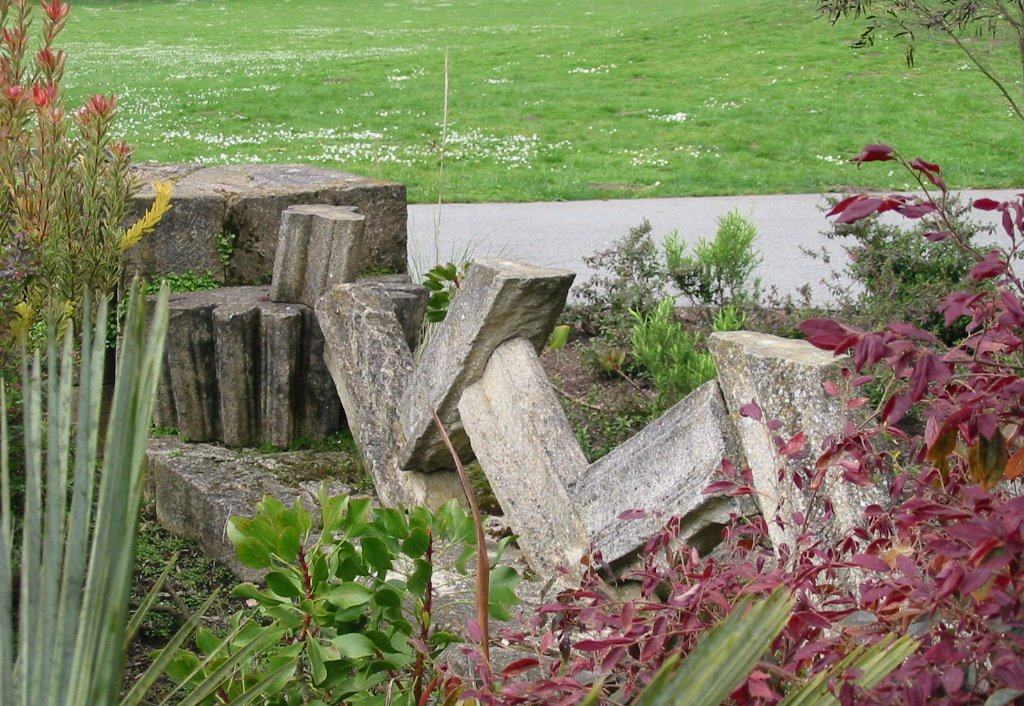
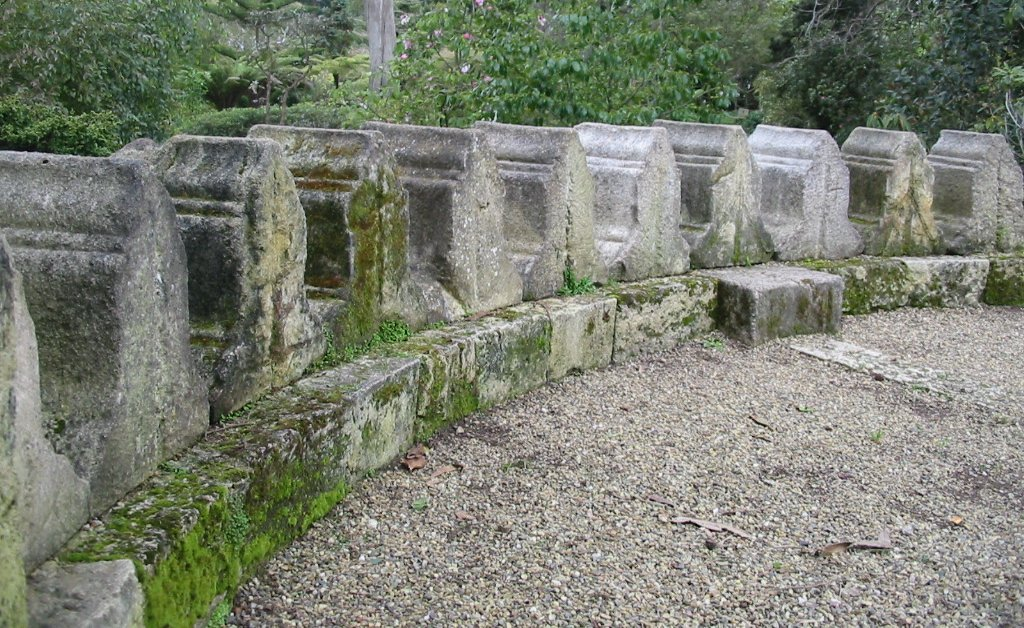
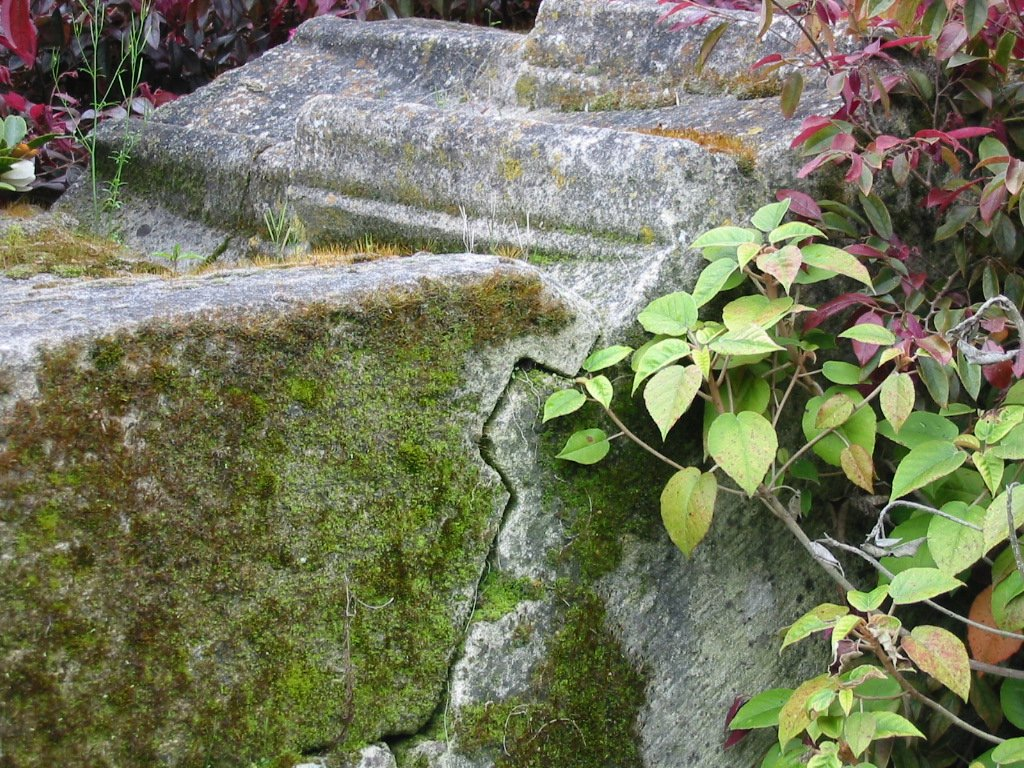
Monastery stones in Golden Gate Park

In 1940, Hearst decided to give the monastery away. The government of Francisco Franco requested that it be returned to Spain, but Hearst refused. In August 1941, Herbert Fleishhacker, director of the M. H. de Young Memorial Museum, convinced Hearst to give the stones to the City of San Francisco in exchange for the city's payment of his $25,000 storage debt. Hearst stipulated the stones be used to construct a group of museum buildings adjoining the de Young Museum in Golden Gate Park. The city moved the crates from the warehouse to store them outdoors behind the museum and the Japanese Tea Garden, allotting only $5,000 for trucking and for building rough sheds and protective covers. The museum plan was estimated to cost $500,000, but that amount was not available. Morgan prepared several layouts for the city to approve, each with a different arrangement of the buildings than in Spain. However, in December 1941, the U.S. was drawn into World War II and the museum plans were shelved. Picking up the project in 1946, the city paid Morgan to construct a scale model of the complex of buildings which was to be the Museum of Medieval Arts, a West Coast version of The Cloisters in New York.

The city was unable to raise money to build the museum, and the stones were damaged in five fires. The first came soon after the crates were set down in Golden Gate Park. Morgan said that "piles of burning boxes were pulled over and down by the Fire Department, many hurled over a hundred and fifty feet." Hearst died in 1951, and Morgan died in 1957; neither of them saw anything built with the stones. Two fires in 1959 appeared to be arson, and many of the fire-heated stones were weakened or cracked from sudden cooling by water. In 1960, Steilberg was hired to inspect the stones once again; he used a ball-peen hammer to lightly strike each stone and listen for a solid ringing tone, or a dull thud which indicated cracking. He found that a little more than half the stones were sound.

In 1965, the Museum Society raised $40,000 to mount the grand portal of the old church. It was installed in the de Young Museum, the centerpiece of Hearst Court, the main exhibit hall. The rest of the stones were abandoned by the museum in May 1969 with the announcement that there would be no reconstruction. After this, stones were occasionally taken by park workers and used to decorate Golden Gate Park.

In 1989 or 1990, a San Francisco city worker dumped an unused granite bollard amid the monastery stones; the 4-foot (1.2 m) tall bollard was once used as a traffic barrier. Some self-styled Hindu park users led by performance artist Michael Bowen, calling himself Guru Baba Kali Das, began to worship the phallus-shaped bollard as a lingam; they wrestled some of the monastery's stones into a religious circle, calling the circle Shiva Linga. The city sued to reclaim the area in 1993, but lost the battle in court. In January 1994 the city arranged to move the traffic bollard to Bowen's garage, serving as his temple. Bowen later offered the granite bollard for sale and admitted that the whole episode was a performance piece.

In 1999, some of the stones were used to construct an outdoor reading terrace adjoining the Helen Crocker Russell Library of Horticulture, part of the Strybing Arboretum and Botanical Gardens in Golden Gate Park. Other stones were used for various purposes around Golden Gate Park and the Japanese Tea Garden, taken unofficially by park workers as they saw fit. Some of these ended up in the park's AIDS Memorial Grove, others on a scent-based flower walkway named Garden of Fragrance.

=== University of San Francisco ===
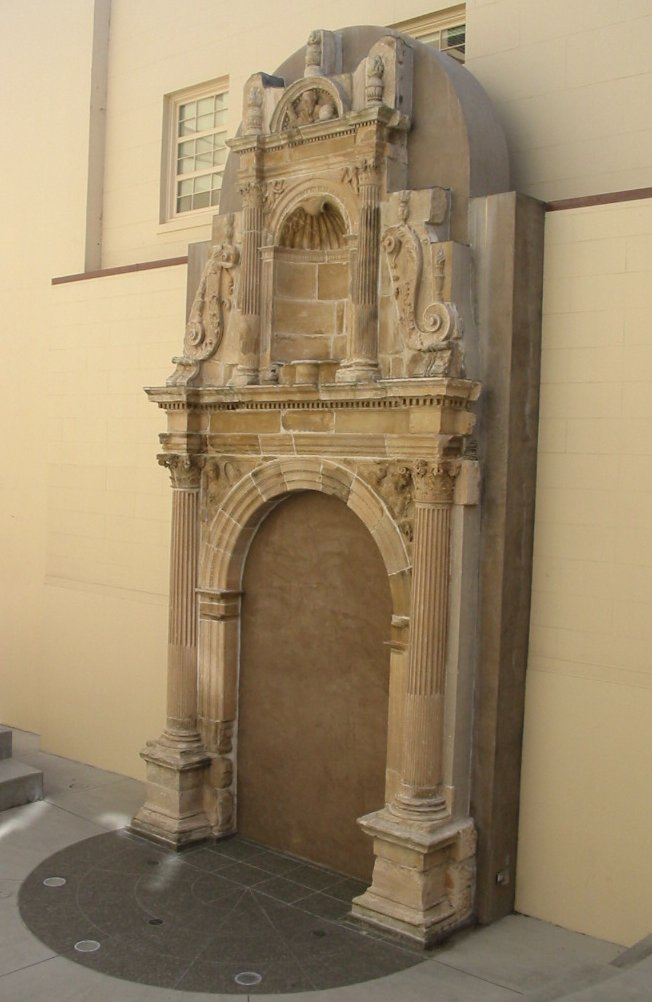
The portal of the church of Santa María de Óvila was finally installed in 2008 in the Ovila Amphitheater (2011)

In 2002, the old church portal was donated by the de Young Museum to the University of San Francisco (a Jesuit university), and in 2008 it was associated with the construction of Kalmanovitz Hall. It serves as the backdrop of the outdoor Ovila Amphitheater (37.7757°N 122.451°W), near an older Romanesque portal from Northern Italy.

=== Abbey of New Clairvaux ===
The Abbot-Emeritus of the Abbey of New Clairvaux, Thomas X. Davis, first saw the stones and pictured them reassembled in a monastic context on September 15, 1955—his first day in California. He had arrived in San Francisco to serve as a new monk in Vina, California, at the Trappist monastery called Our Lady of New Clairvaux. It was located on land once used by Leland Stanford as vineyards. Davis's superior met him at the airport and drove him through Golden Gate Park where he stopped to show the new arrival the stones sitting among the weeds. From time to time in subsequent years, Davis revisited the stones, only to find them in worsening condition.

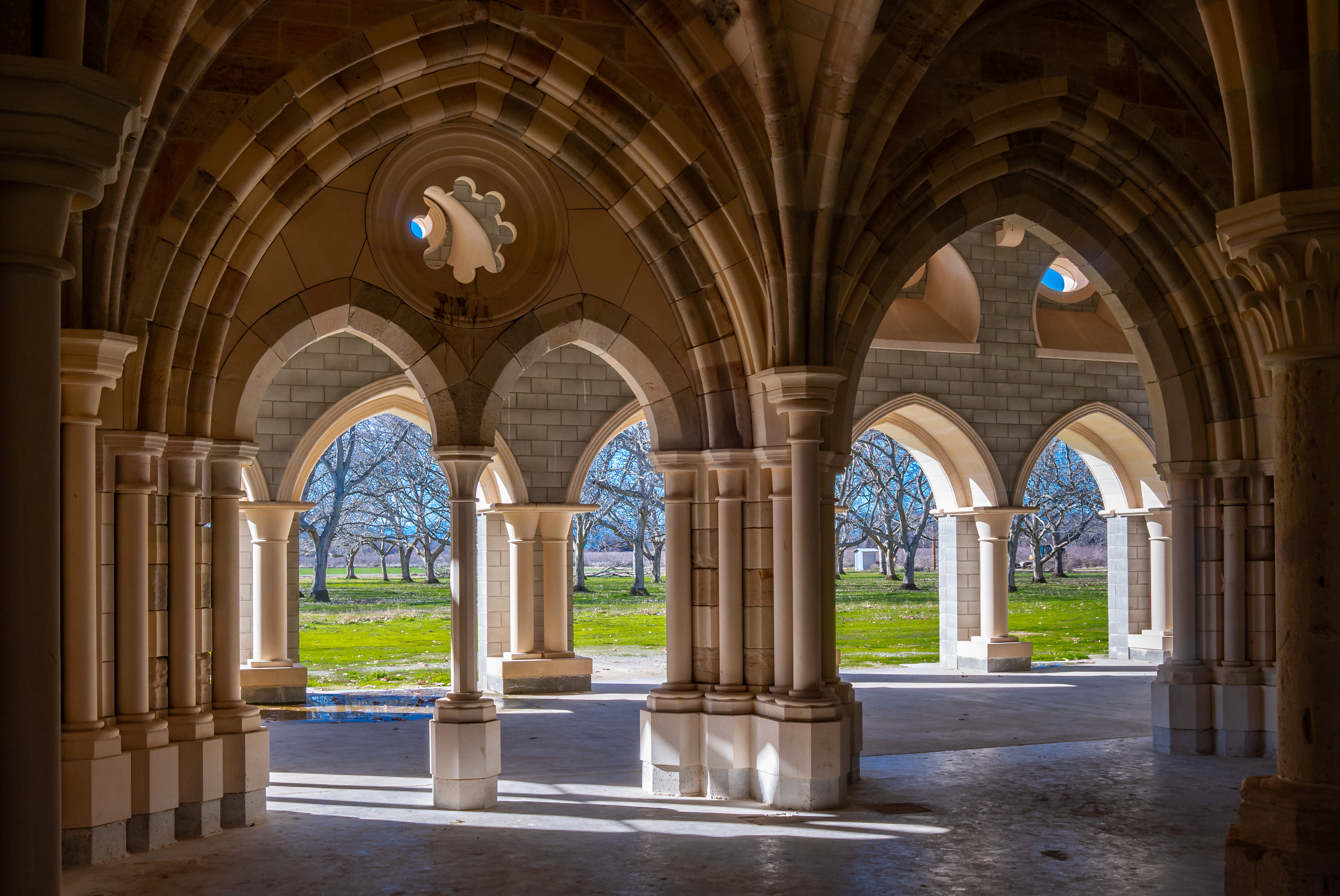
View from inside the rebuilt 800-year-old chapter house

In 1981, architectural historian Margaret Burke began working under a grant from the Hearst Foundation to inventory the remaining stones. She said it was "an excavation project" because of the weeds, blackberry brambles and tree roots growing over them. Burke identified about 60% of the stones belonging to the chapter house, a rectangular building originally spanning 31 by 46 feet (9.4 by 14.0 m). She separated the chapter house stones, surrounded them with a fence and began creating templates for rebuilding the arched entrances. During 1980–1982 the museum board sought $45 million for an expansion project that included $3 million for rebuilding the chapter house.

Meanwhile, Davis asked a museum staff member for permission to take several truckloads of stones to Vina to be used for architectural decoration. Park workers helped him load the most ornate pieces he could find, and they were hauled away. Not told of the arrangement, Burke discovered that Davis had taken some of the chapter house stones, and the museum board insisted these be returned. Davis was left with 58 stones from other monastery buildings.

In 1983 and 1987, Davis made unsuccessful requests for all of the chapter house stones. After the 1989 Loma Prieta earthquake, the de Young museum was to be rebuilt, and the future of the stones was reconsidered. In September 1993, museum director Harry Parker joined with Davis to sign an unconditional permanent loan of the chapter house stones to New Clairvaux. In 1994, the city approved the loan with the stipulation that the building be restored accurately and that it be occasionally open to the public. The stones were transported in 20 truckloads to Vina. Inside an old brick barn built by Stanford to make brandy, the stones began to be fitted together, laid flat on Burke's plywood templates.

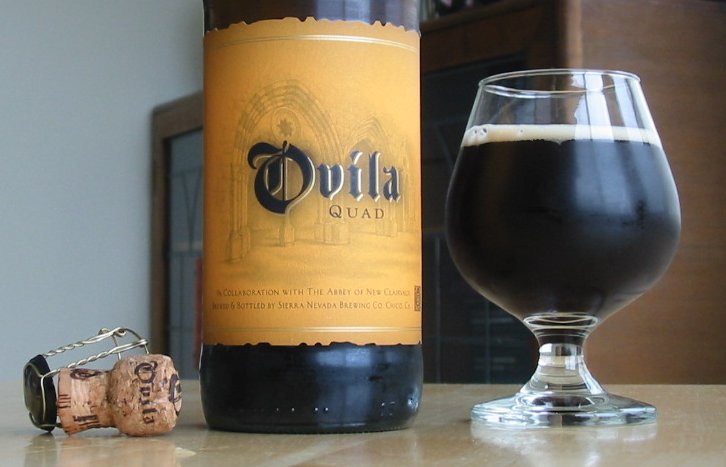
One of the Ovila brand beverages

Ground was broken in 2003 on the site of an orchard (39.9372°N 122.0632°W) next to the main cloister building. Architect Patrick Cole of Arcademe, overseeing the rebuilding project, said that there were more than half of the required stones for the chapter house. Of the missing stones, more than 90% were repeating-pattern stones with available templates to carve replacements. Stonemasons Oskar Kempf and Frank Helmholz used modern hydraulic lime as mortar rather than making their own as was done in the Middle Ages. Helmholz said of the opportunity offered by the project that it was "something most stonemasons don't do in all their career."

The strength of the building is twice what it was in Spain, with the stones supporting their own weight as designed, augmented by an external framework of steel and concrete to hold them together when the California ground shakes. Contractor Phil Sunseri said that the building foundation was earthquake resistant as well; with a three-foot-thick (1 m) mat of concrete and steel underneath, such that "the entire building will move as one unit." The reassembled chapter house is the largest example of original Cistercian Gothic architecture in the Western Hemisphere, and it is the oldest building in America west of the Rocky Mountains.

Nearby Sierra Nevada Brewing Company partnered with the monks of New Clairvaux to make a series of Belgian-style beers under the Ovila Abbey brand. In late 2010, the beer producer launched a website to tell about the making of the beer product line and the story of the restoration of the stones. Sierra Nevada founder Ken Grossman said he had long been interested in making a line of Belgian beers, and the abbey's project provided a good opportunity. The first product, a Dubbel, was released in March 2011, followed in July by a Saison and in November by a Quadrupel. Sierra Nevada has dedicated a percentage of the beer sales to assist in funding the rebuilding project.
