= Wyntoon =

Historic estate in Siskiyou County, California

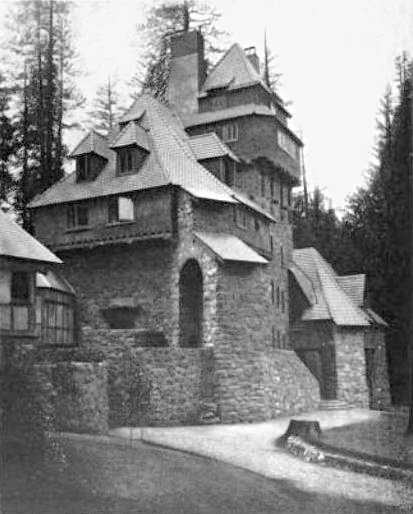
Phoebe Hearst's Wyntoon with its main tower in 1906, designed by Bernard Maybeck. This building burned down in 1929.

Wyntoon is a private estate in rural Siskiyou County, California, owned by the Hearst Corporation. Architects Willis Polk, Bernard Maybeck and Julia Morgan all designed structures for Wyntoon, beginning in 1899.

The land, sited at two sharp bends in the McCloud River, was named by financial adviser Edward Clark for the local Native American tribe of the Wintun people. Beginning as a humble fishing resort, the land was improved by a series of people, notably San Francisco attorney Charles Stetson Wheeler, his client Phoebe Apperson Hearst, and her son William Randolph Hearst who disputed with his cousin over ownership. Prominent structures, noted for their architecture, have been built on the land, some lost to fire, while other multimillion-dollar buildings were planned, but not built. Famous visitors to Wyntoon include Clark Gable, Charles Lindbergh, Joseph P. Kennedy Sr. and his son John F. Kennedy.

== Justin Sisson's fishing resort ==
The earliest known inhabitants of the area of Wyntoon were the Winnemem Wintu tribe of Native Americans, a subgroup of the Wintun people.

In the 1880s, outdoorsman, guide, hunter and trapper Justin Hinckley Sisson came to the area and established a hotel, restaurant and tavern at the foot of Mount Shasta. He advocated for a railroad line to be extended northward from Redding to his location, and was successful. Construction of the Central Pacific Railroad through the Siskiyou Trail began in the mid-1880s, and Sisson bought 120 acres (49 ha) in its path. The railroad was completed in 1887 and brought miners, hunters, fishermen, loggers, naturalists and tourists. With his wife, the former Miss Lydia Field, Sisson operated the inn, and he led various groups of hunters, geologists and mountain climbers. With profits from his successful business, Sisson acquired large parcels of land including the tract which would become Wyntoon. He established the town of Sisson surrounding his inn, and he built a fishing resort a half-day's ride away on the McCloud River, at an elevation between 2,700 and 3,000 feet (820 and 910 m), some 16 miles (26 km) distant. Popular with hunters and fishermen, it became known as "Sisson's-on-the-McCloud".

Justin Sisson died in 1893. In 1924, the town of Sisson was renamed Mount Shasta, California.

== Charles S. Wheeler's hunting lodge ==
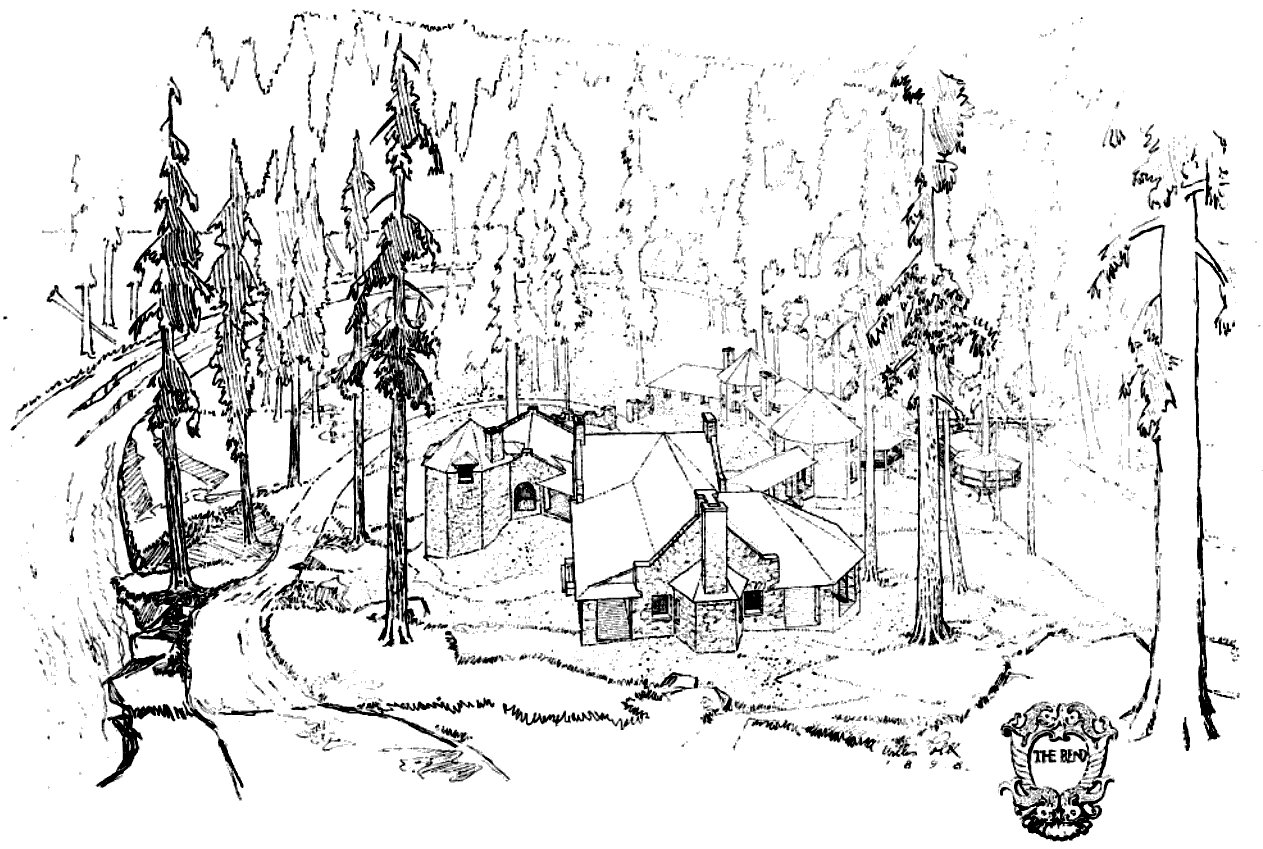
Most of Willis Polk's 1899 structure "The Bend" was torn down in 1934 and rebuilt by Julia Morgan.

In 1899, Sisson's widow sold the McCloud River fishing resort site to Charles Stetson Wheeler, a wealthy attorney from San Francisco. This parcel lay in the Cascade Range of mountains, south by southeast of Mount Shasta. Wheeler called this holding the Wheeler Ranch, and he built a hunting lodge on the river at Horseshoe Bend—its cornerstone was laid in 1899. The multi-wing lodge, dramatic with its stone walls and slate roof, was designed by San Francisco architect Willis Polk, and included an 800-book library with room for hundreds of Native American baskets. Wheeler directed Polk to give the lodge a "fish tower"—a high study with a view, and two windows which were aquariums containing local trout. A Latin inscription over the entrance indicated this room was a temple to fishing: piscatoribus sacrum. Polk's design was pictured in July 1899 in The American Architect and Building News which described it as a "California Mountain Home". Sir Banister Fletcher included the building in a list of Shingle Style architecture. The layout of the structure, a "rambling group of masses", snaked through the trees, curving to follow the bend in the river, the curve creating a courtyard with a circular drive and a central fountain. The dining room enjoyed a three-sided view of the river, and diners could take the air on a wraparound porch. The porch opened to the river in a flight of wooden steps leading down to an octagonal gazebo pierced and supported by a large tree, overhanging the tumbling waters. Massive fireplaces and heavy timbers gave the impression of a medieval estate interior. Polk's use of stone and wood on the exterior achieved a sense of compatibility with the land, celebrating the setting's primal beauty.

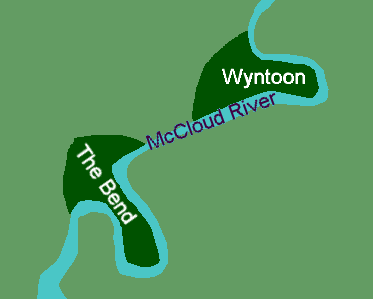
From 1900 to 1934, Charles Stetson Wheeler's The Bend was downstream of Wyntoon. Afterward, the properties were combined.

The Wheeler family stayed at the ranch many a summer. In 1900, Wheeler invited his client Phoebe Hearst to visit Wheeler Ranch with his family for the summer. Hearst asked if she could purchase the land, but Wheeler declined. Insistent, Hearst came to an arrangement whereby she would purchase a 99-year lease on part of the land, and she also purchased adjoining land held by Edward Clark, her financial adviser, who called it Wyntoon for the local Wintu tribe. Hearst applied the name Wyntoon to the combination of Clark's former holdings and her new lease, and in 1901 contracted for a magnificent seven-story house to be built. Wheeler was displeased with the extravagant plans, as he and Hearst had previously agreed her building would be modest. However, he did not stop her.

Wheeler retained the part of Wheeler Ranch that was not leased to Hearst, including The Bend. In 1911, Wheeler invited Austro-Hungarian artist and naturalist Edward Stuhl and his wife Rosie to live on the property; they made extensive studies of plant and animal life in the area, and collected many hundreds of specimens. Stuhl, an avid mountain climber, published Wildflowers of Mount Shasta from his base at Wheeler Ranch. After Wheeler's death in 1923, Stuhl served as custodian of the ranch. William Randolph Hearst bought Wyntoon outright from its 99-year lease in 1929, and in 1934 bought all of Wheeler Ranch and The Bend, a combined total of 50,000 acres (20,000 ha).

== Phoebe Hearst's castle ==
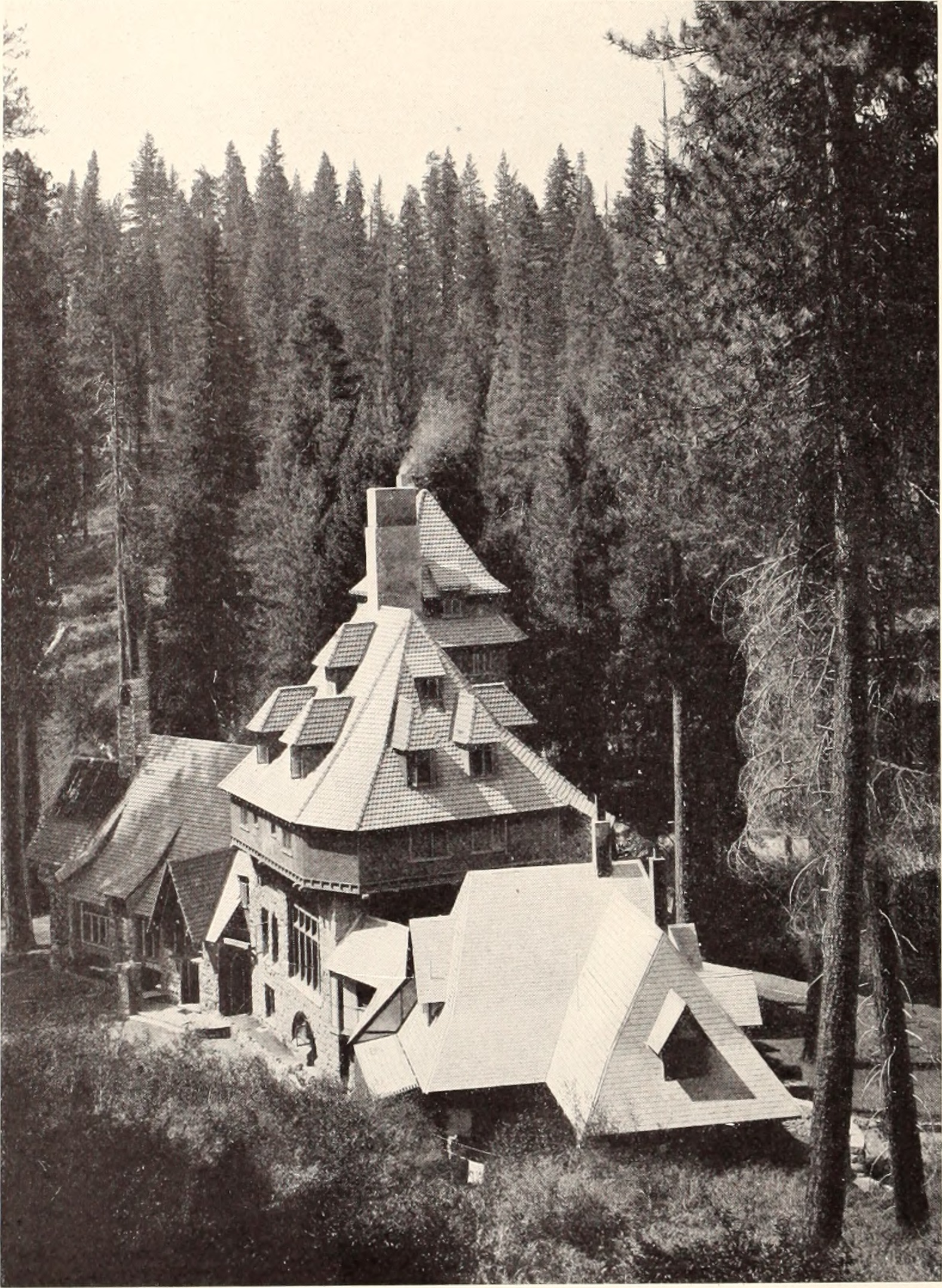
Bernard Maybeck's Wyntoon project seen in 1906. It burned down in 1929.

Phoebe Hearst, upon signing the 99-year lease, decided to build a very grand residence. She hired Bernard Maybeck to design one in the Gothic style of a Rhine River castle. The structure was mainly complete in 1902, and cost Hearst $100,000. Maybeck hired Julia Morgan to assist in the design.

The castle's layout was fitted to the slope of the site, and to a semicircle of six tall conifers. Its footprint was 120 by 56 feet (37 by 17 m); an underground cellar was 45 feet (14 m) wide, 15 feet (4.6 m) high, and ran the length of the building, containing stores and a central heating furnace supplying steam throughout the building. The central tower made of stone reached to a height of 75 feet (23 m). A plumbed room entered from the outside allowed fishermen and hunters to clean their catch and themselves. Six floors of sleeping rooms were contained in the central tower; each bedroom entered from landings along the main spiral staircase carved of stone. The exterior of the tower was thick load-bearing crowning wall topped with a steeply angled roof to hold the weight of snow, and to shed excess snow. Glazed Paris-green tile from the Netherlands surfaced the roof, providing "a misty color like the holes between the branches in the trees in the forest." Bluish-gray basalt volcanic stone was quarried from local lava flows; it supplied the strength of the massive walls.

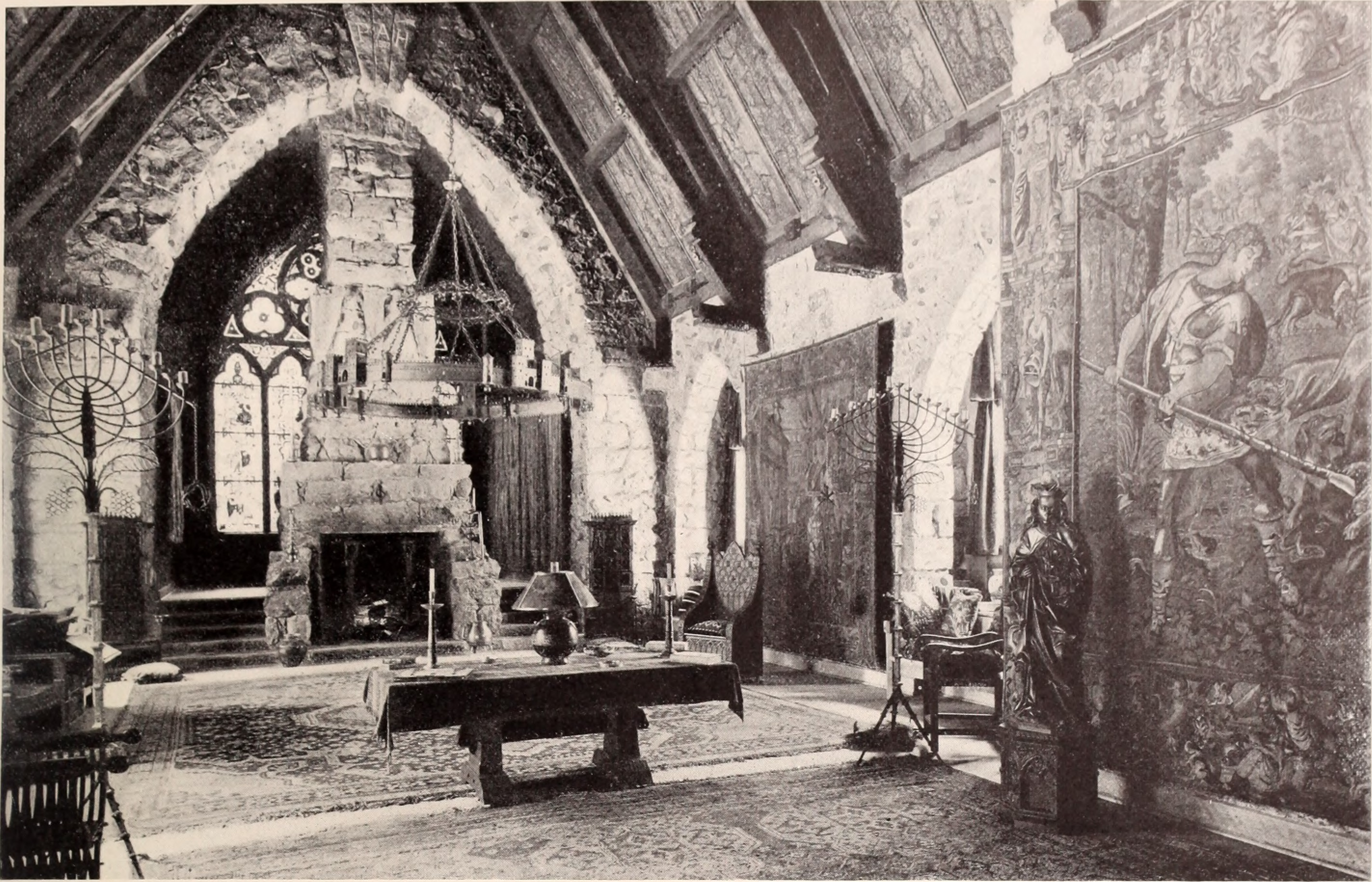
1906 living room interior

The living room, 80 by 36 feet (24 by 11 m), had at one end an alcove framing a stained glass window, a copy of the 13th century one in Lorenzkirche in Nuremberg, the reproduction fabricated in the Netherlands. The room's apex was 36 feet high—a meeting of steeply angled wooden beams resting on 7-foot (2.1 m) thick stone walls. A tall fireplace separated the alcove from the majority of the living room; a large man could stand in its opening. Another fireplace warmed the other end of the living room. Tapestries hung from the stone walls to add a medieval appearance. Frederick Meyer made furniture for this room, and for all Wyntoon, in European vernacular style.

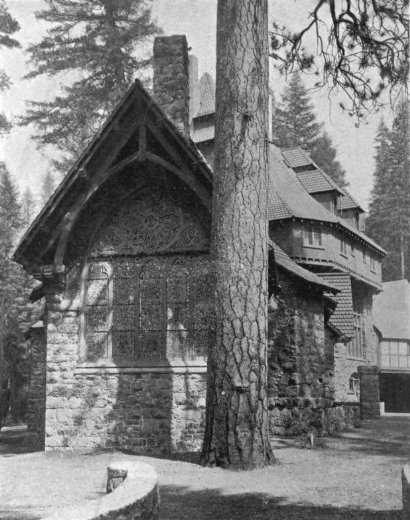
Exterior of the living room showing a stained glass window. The scale is deceptive: A man standing under the window ledge would not reach the bottom of the sill.

Maybeck designed a dining hall much like the living room, with Gothic stone walls and high peaked roof, and two opposing fireplaces, but its Gothic tables were unusually placed against the walls leaving the center area open. Benches were provided for diners to sit. The kitchen wing, 40 by 40 feet (12 by 12 m), adjoined the dining room, connected through a wide butler's hall. Staff were provided rooms in the kitchen wing. Its foundation of cut stone reached to the top of the ground floor; the second story's wall was of rubble stone. The roof was topped by light gray slate. Initial critical reactions to the kitchen wing's exterior appearance led Hearst to surround it with shrubbery.

Phoebe Hearst also built other structures including The Gables—a storybook dwelling for overflow guests—and a "Honeymoon Cottage". The castle was habitable in 1902, completely finished in 1904. It was featured in American Homes and Gardens in 1906, a three-page spread; the same space given the house in Architectural Review in 1904. The writer in Architectural Review criticized the quaint wooden carvings which gave the impression of "pastry and perfume", but praised the most important aspects of the structure:

The dark height of the room, the unobstructed archways, the deep blues, reds and yellows of the cathedral window, to which time had given maturity, the tapestries, the little flicker of fire, and the roaring of the river outside; and you satiated, tired and inspired by the day's trip among hazel, dogwood, great aged pines, rocks, cascades, great trunks of trees fallen years ago—a disheveled harmony—here you can reach all that is within you.

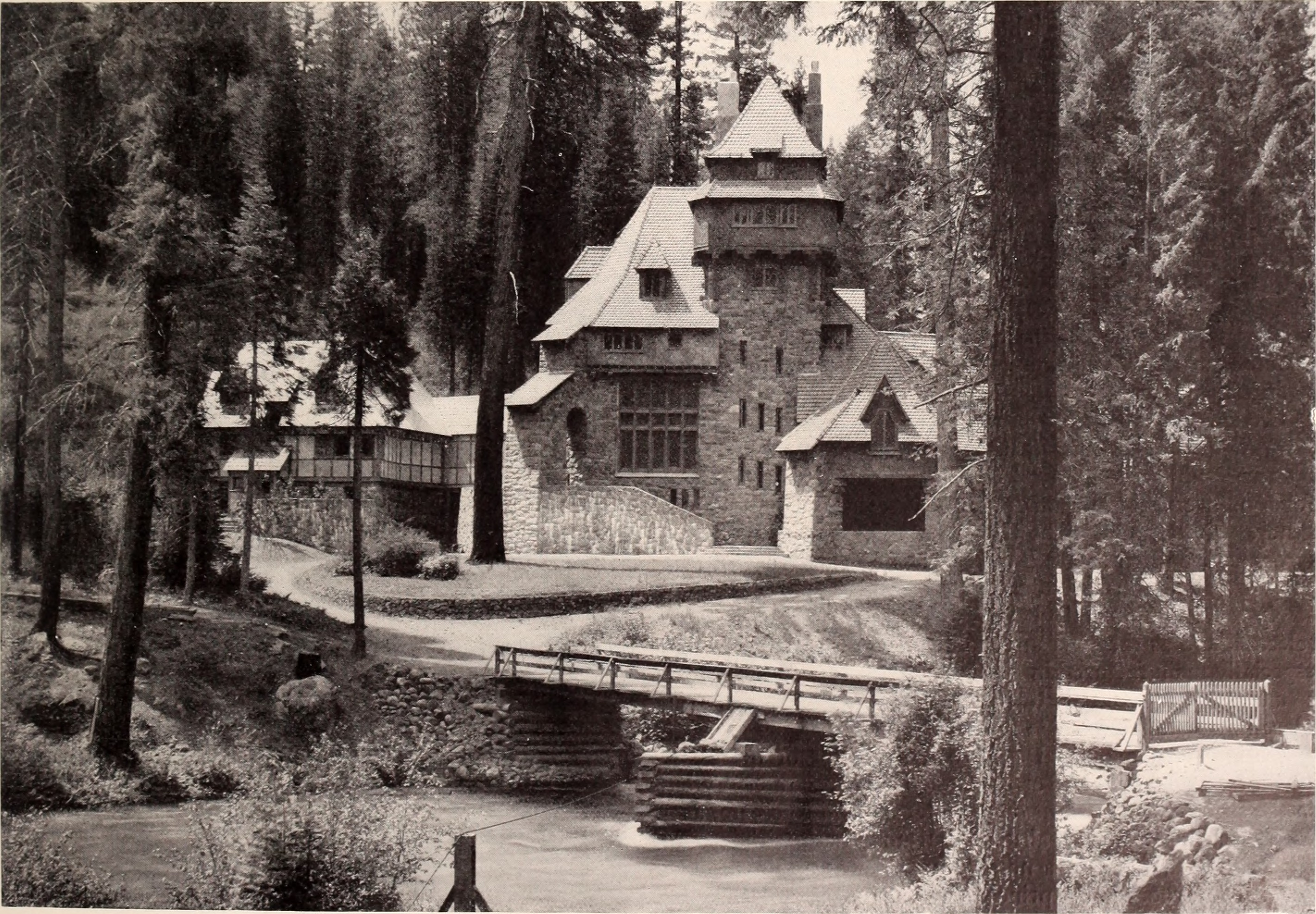
Wyntoon from across the McCloud River in 1906

Hearst summered at Wyntoon and raised her son's children there when he was not watching them. William Randolph Hearst and his wife Millicent produced five sons from 1904 to 1915—each one spent summer months at Wyntoon with their grandmother. The boys' father sent instructions about their upbringing, writing after the eldest boy George Randolph Hearst was nearly washed down the McCloud, that the boys needed "a severe warning about the river". Hearst occasionally entertained her society friends and acquaintances at Wyntoon, bringing selected guests up north from the Panama–Pacific International Exposition of 1915. At her death in 1919, she willed Wyntoon to her niece Anne Apperson Flint, along with a Cadillac car and $250,000.

Flint moved in with her husband, Joseph Marshall Flint, M.D, a former Yale professor of surgery. During this time, architect Julia Morgan designed four structures which were built at Wyntoon: a superintendent's residence and a separate servant's quarters in 1924, and in 1925, a stables building holding a caretaker's house erected near a "Swiss Chalet" which was built for higher-status domestic staff.

== William Randolph Hearst's projects ==
From his mother's will, William Randolph Hearst received the bulk of the family inheritance, including the 270,000-acre (110,000 ha) ranch in San Simeon, the 900,000-acre (360,000 ha) Babicora Ranch in Mexico, a fruit orchard in Butte County, and various mining and industrial stocks, the whole worth around 5–10 million dollars. Wyntoon, however, was given to his cousin Anne Apperson Flint in his mother's will, and Hearst was angered over this. He refused to return to Flint any of the art objects from Wyntoon that had been loaned to the Palace of Fine Arts for an exhibit. In 1925 after years of acrimonious negotiation, he bought Wyntoon from Flint for $198,000, but he remained forever embittered toward his cousin.

In the winter of 1929–1930, Maybeck's Wyntoon masterpiece burned down, possibly from a kitchen fire. Time magazine reported Hearst's losses at $300,000 to $500,000, including portions of his art collection. In early 1930, Hearst contracted to have Morgan design an even larger castle as replacement. Morgan was already working for Hearst on Hearst Castle in San Simeon and nearly finished with The Hacienda near King City.

Morgan collaborated with her early mentor and teacher Maybeck on plans for an eight-story Bavarian Gothic-style castle with two great towers and more minor turrets, some 61 bedrooms proposed for Wyntoon's largest building project. Hearst instructed Arthur Byne, his art agent based in Madrid, to find likely buildings he could purchase for their stonework, to give Wyntoon an ancient air. In December 1930, Byne discovered Santa Maria de Ovila, a 700-year-old Cistercian monastery, and Hearst paid $97,000 for it. The monastery was taken apart and removed illegally, but the Spanish government was changing hands and was not effective in stopping Hearst's hired men. Some 10,000 stones were shipped to a warehouse in San Francisco at a total cost of about $1 million.

Another old structure removed from Europe was proposed for Wyntoon: the great tithe barn of Bradenstoke Priory in England. Most of the priory had been used by Hearst to refurbish St Donat's Castle in Wales in the late 1920s, but the tithe barn had been crated and shipped to San Simeon for possible use there. Hearst proposed that the unused Bradenstoke barn be incorporated into his great castle, and had Morgan study the possibilities.

In the spring of 1931, Morgan offered several designs for Hearst's consideration, all of them using the stones of the Spanish monastery on the ground floor, reinforced by steel girders to take the weight of the upper floors. Portions of the monastery were considered as a library, an "armory", and a living room. The final proposal from Morgan included an indoor swimming pool constructed from the monastery's old church. The 150-foot (46 m) long swimming pool featured changing rooms and lounges in the old side chapels, shallow water for wading in the apse, 11-foot (3.4 m) deep water in the central plunge, and a diving board where the altar had been.

In July 1931, as a steam shovel was making ready to level enough land to accommodate the great castle, Hearst put a stop to all his construction plans. The Great Depression had greatly diminished his income, and he could not pay for his $50 million project at Wyntoon while at the same time indulging his expansion at San Simeon. Abandoning the massive castle idea, Hearst instead asked Morgan to design a "Bavarian Village" with multiple half-timbered buildings in the medieval style of Germany or Austria. Hearst sent Morgan to Europe to study suitable buildings; she brought fine artist Doris Day with her to investigate architectural inscriptions and painting styles. In 1932, Morgan put together a master plan for Wyntoon. It described a group of guesthouses with romantic names such as Cinderella House, Fairy House and Bear House, arranged not in a cramped medieval style but symmetrically around a common green in the Beaux-Arts style. These three-story structures with steeply gabled roofs were completed in 1933. Swiss artisan Jules Suppo and his assistants carved much of the German Gothic decorations. Day painted fine inscriptions and exterior decorative patterns. Hungarian illustrator Willy Pogany painted exterior murals depicting Russian and Germanic fairy tales such as those from the Brothers Grimm, but Pogany's versions were bright, humorous and cheerful, not dark and grim.

Downstream of the Bavarian Village, Morgan's plan called for a selection of leisure activities. A swimming pool with a pool house was to be near tennis courts and a croquet lawn, and a dining hall called "The Gables" would be equipped to show films. Though San Simeon could house perhaps 30 to 50 guests, the expanded Wyntoon plan could accommodate 100 for a weekend.

In 1934, Hearst bought all of Wheeler Ranch. Polk's structure "The Bend" was torn down except for one wing containing the master bedroom. This wing held the cornerstone engraved "The Bend – 1899". The rest of the building was redesigned by Morgan in Gothic Revival style and rebuilt from 1935 to 1941 using many of its original stones.

William Randolph Hearst walks amid buildings of the Bavarian Village, followed by his dachshund Gandhi. This image by Peter Stackpole was one of a series published by Life magazine in a 1935 article.

On January 1, 1935, photographer Peter Stackpole's images of Wyntoon were published in Life magazine, showing Hearst relaxing at Wyntoon with friends. Hearst's communications office at Wyntoon was shown in the photos; it was built next to Bear House to keep him abreast of current events. This office was fitted into a shingle-covered bungalow built to house Joe Willicombe, Hearst's private secretary. The structure served as the "nerve center" of Hearst's publishing empire, with three round-the-clock operators minding the telegraph facilities and the telephone switchboard.

In mid-1937, Hearst was forced by bankruptcy to sign over all of his holdings to a group of trustees called the Conservation Committee. Wyntoon was included; it was estimated the prior year to be worth $300,000. Headed by New York Judge Clarence J. Shearn, the trustees slashed Hearst's costs and halted the smaller side projects at San Simeon and Wyntoon which had kept so many contractors busy. Wyntoon was maintained only by a skeleton staff paid for by the Hearst Corporation. Hearst never hosted more than 14 guests at Wyntoon after the bankruptcy. From 1938 to 1940, Hearst's art collections were cataloged and sold, including items from Wyntoon. Hearst was made to pay rent out of his allowance when he stayed at any of his properties.

After the December 7, 1941, attack on Pearl Harbor, blackout conditions were imposed on San Simeon because of its nearness to the ocean and associated likelihood of Japanese shelling, so before Christmas Hearst moved to Wyntoon with his lover, actress Marion Davies. There, the two lived in Bear House at the river's edge with their pet dachshunds. Davies' cherished dachshund named Gandhi, 15 years old, fell gravely ill during this time; a veterinarian was called and the animal put down by injection. Distraught, Davies raged through Bear House, later writing: "I broke everything I could lay my hands on." Hearst's favorite dog Helen died in his arms at Wyntoon; he buried her on a hillside covered with flowers, the spot marked by a stone inscribed, "Here lies dearest Helen – my devoted friend."

Song of the River

The snow melts on the mountain
And the water runs down to the spring,
And the spring in a turbulent fountain,
With a song of youth to sing,
Runs down to the riotous river,
And the river flows to the sea,
And the water again
Goes back in rain
To the hills where it used to be.
And I wonder if life's deep mystery
Isn't much like the rain and snow
Returning through all eternity
To the place it used to know.

— William Randolph Hearst

During the Wyntoon residency of Hearst and Davies, they received fewer visitors than they had at San Simeon, because it was more remote. They spent much time together, and Davies picked up sewing again after years of no practice. She sewed silk fabric into ties for Hearst. He wrote her a poem or a short note every night, which he slipped under her door for her to see in the morning. Over the 1943–1944 winter, with snow and ice transforming the outdoor scenery, Wyntoon hosted actor Clark Gable, film directors Louis B. Mayer and Raoul Walsh, columnist Louella Parsons, cartoonist Jimmy Swinnerton and his wife, aviator Charles Lindbergh and his family, the former president's daughter Anna Roosevelt and her husband John Boettiger (who worked for Hearst), and millionaire industrialist Joe Kennedy who brought his 26-year-old son "Jack", the future president. Jack surprised Hearst by swimming in the freezing McCloud.

== Today ==
Hearst's trustees reorganized the Hearst Corporation in 1943, installing Richard E. Berlin as president. Under Berlin, Wyntoon was made to turn a profit—the old 50,000-acre Wheeler Ranch holding and adjoining parcels adding up to 67,000 acres (27,000 ha) were logged and replanted with more tree seedlings, the operation generating about $2 million annually by 1959.

In the late 1980s, architects Blunk Demattei Associates (BDA) began working with the Hearst Corporation to complete the interior of "Angel House" whose construction had been halted in the late 1930s. BDA next began to remodel the one original bedroom wing of Polk's "The Bend". There, the second and main bedroom wing (finished in the 1950s in Tudor style) burned down on December 30, 1992, and BDA was contracted to rebuild it. Sensitive to the problem of recreating the ambiance, BDA used sugar pine paneling in keeping with other rooms on site, wrought iron from Poland and from local blacksmiths, stones quarried locally, and Renaissance-era fireplaces.

Today, the estate is owned by the Hearst Corporation, and is not open to the public. Wyntoon is located at approximately 41°11′21″N 122°03′58″W. It is north of Lake McCloud, a man-made lake completed in 1965, and about 9 miles (14 km) due east of Dunsmuir, California. Energetic kayakers willing to endure dangerous rapids can view the estate from the Upper McCloud River during spring and summer snowmelt.

The estate is grandfathered in the law as a "senior rights holder" to use an unlimited amount of water from the adjoining McCloud River.
