= Jorge Loyzaga =

- Born: 1937-1938; Mexico City, Mexico
- Occupation: Architect
- Children: 2
- Buildings: La Milarca; Torre Comercial América; Centro Cultural Juan Beckmann Gallardo

Jorge Loyzaga is a Mexican architect, interior designer, conservator-restorer and professor. He is the founder of Loyzaga Studio, which has become the most prominent proponent of New Classical architecture in Mexico.

An estimated 600 architectural works have been attributed to Loyzaga, primarily private residences. Loyzaga has taken inspiration from distinct architectural traditions, including pre-Hispanic, Spanish Baroque and Beaux-Arts.

== Career ==
Loyzaga Studio was founded in 1969.

In regards to restoration, some notable examples are Loyzaga's involvement in the interior design for some of the rooms in Chapultepec Castle and help in the restoration of the main altar of the Metropolitan Cathedral of Mexico City. In the early 1990s, Loyzaga helped with restoration work of the Fort Nuestra Señora de la Soledad in Humåtak, Guam.

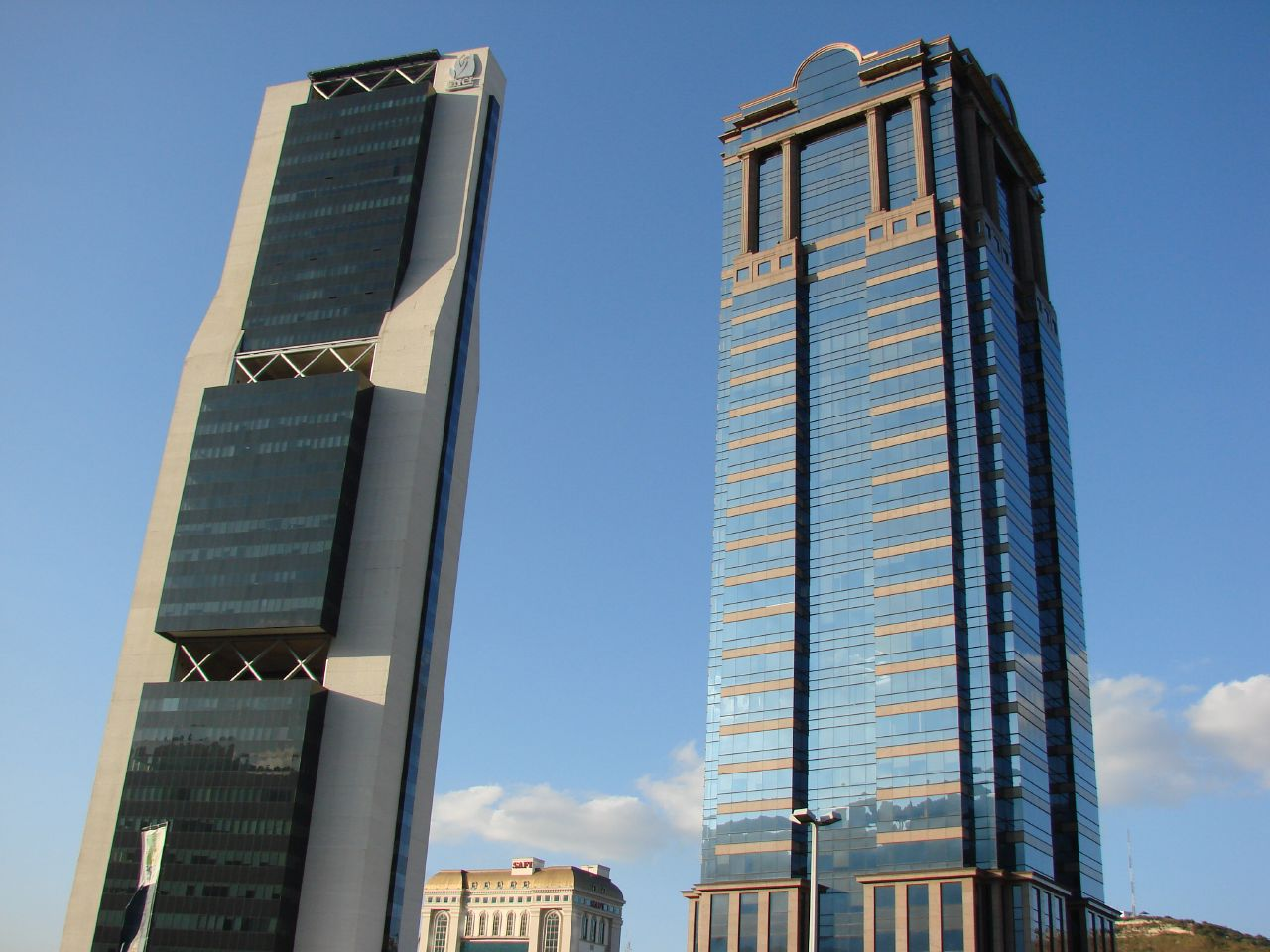
The Torre Comercial América, on the right

Completed in 1991, the Torre Comercial América was the tallest skyscraper in the Monterrey metro area until 2000, when it was surpassed by Torre Avalanz.

Loyzaga Studio is a member of the International Network for Traditional Building, Architecture & Urbanism (INTBAU) and the Institute of Classical Architecture & Art.

In the 1980s, Loyzaga designed La Milarca, the private home of Mauricio Fernández Garza in San Pedro Garza García, Nuevo León. The building was best known for its incorporation of a 16th century Mudéjar ceiling from Almagro, Spain. In 1928 the ceiling was smuggled to the United States by Arthur Byne at the request of William Randolph Hearst. It was purchased by Fernández Garza in 1975 from an estate sale in North Carolina. A replica of La Milarca was created to house the art collection of Fernández Garza as a public museum, the Museo La Milarca, including the original Mudéjar ceiling.

The studio is headquartered in San Miguel Chapultepec and is currently run by Loyzaga with his twin daughters, Sophia Alexandra Loyzaga and Fernanda Loyzaga.

Completed in 2018, the Centro Cultural Juan Beckmann Gallardo is a cultural institute in Tequila, Jalisco ran by the Beckmann family, owners of the José Cuervo tequila brand. The cultural institute was inspired by the 18th century Baroque building of the Colegio de San Ignacio de Loyola Vizcaínas.

Throughout its existence, Loyzaga Studio has employed several workshops of traditional Mexican craftspeople, particularly woodworkers, for their projects.

In 2023, the first book covering Loyzaga's work was published by Rizzoli. The illustrated book covers 19 residential buildings. Philip Alvaré, editor of the book, cited the 1897 manuel The Decoration of Houses as having an influence on Loyzaga.

== Personal life ==
Loyzaga designed and owns a house in Acapulco that incorporates parts of a transplanted 18th century bahay na bato with capiz shell windows. The house is a reference to the Manila-Acapulco Galleons.
