= Mildred Stapley Byne =

American art historian

Mildred Stapley Byne (1875-1941) was an American art historian who specialized in Spanish art and architecture. With her husband Arthur Byne (1883-1935), whom she married in 1910, she wrote many of the first academic works in English on the architecture and ironwork of Spanish colonial North America.

Byne's first noted essay on "The Great Queen Isabel" was published in Harper's Monthly Magazine in June 1912. Her most famous book is Christopher Columbus, a popular biography that brought new research done in Spanish to English-speaking audiences. Seventeen editions have been published between 1915 and 2012.

Both members of the couple were corresponding members of the Hispanic Society of America, and served as curators of architecture and applied arts from 1916 to 1921. In 1921, the Bynes ended their relationship with the HSA and settled permanently in Madrid.

Through their friend Julia Morgan, the couple helped American collector William Randolph Hearst acquire Spanish art and decorative items. After 1921, the Bynes established themselves as dealers. They also served as historical consultants for Spanish colonial and colonial-style houses in California.

Their work was widely praised, and one reviewer wrote of one of their books: "A book like this is a stimulant to the creative faculty."

In 1931, couple bought a home in Madrid built in 1885 by Don Manuel Caldero, the Marqués de Salamanca. It was purchased by the United States government in 1944 and now serves as an American diplomatic building. In 2006, the building was added to the Register of Culturally Significant Property.

The couple's last name is often misspelled as "Byrne" or "Bryne."

== Publications ==
- "The City of Towers," Harper's Monthly Magazine, October 1911.
- "The Great Queen Isabella," Harper's Monthly Magazine, June 1912.
- Rejería of the Spanish Renaissance (New York: The Hispanic Society of America, 1914), with Arthur Byne
- Spanish Ironwork (New York: The Hispanic Society of America, 1915), with Arthur Byne
- Christopher Columbus (New York: The MacMillan Company, 1915)
- Spanish Architecture of the 16th Century (New York: G. P. Putnam and Sons, 1917), with Arthur Byne
- Translation of Orestes Ferrera, Causes and pretexts of the world war: a searching examination into the play and counterplay of European politics from the Franco-Prussian war to the outburst of the great world war (New York: American-Neo-Latin Library, 1918)
- Spanish Interiors and Furniture: Photographs and Drawings, vol. 1 (New York: Architectural Book Pub. Co., c. 1921-1922)
- Decorated Wooden Ceilings in Spain (New York: G. P. Putnam and Sons, 1920), with Arthur Byne
- Spanish Interiors and Furniture, vol. 2 (New York: William Helburn, Inc., 1922), with Arthur Byne
- Popular Weaving and Embroidery in Spain (New York: William Helburn, Inc., 1924)
- Provincial Houses in Spain (New York: W. Helburn Inc., 1925), with Arthur Byne
- Forgotten Shrines of Spain (New York(?): J. B. Lippincott and Co., 1926)
- Important mediaeval and early Renaissance works of art from Spain: sculptures, furniture, textiles, tapestries, and rugs: collection of Conde de las Almenas, Madrid, Spain (New York : American Art Association, 1927), with Arthur Byne and Ercole Canessa.
- The Sculptured Capital in Spain: a Series of Examples Dating from the Sixth to the Sixteenth Century (New York: William Helburn, Inc., 1928)
- Spanish Gardens and Patios (New York(?): J. B. Lippincott and Co., 1928)
- Majorcan Houses and Gardens: A Spanish Island in the Mediterranean (New York: William Helburn, Inc., 1928), with Arthur Byne

== Other Resources ==
- The University of Pennsylvania has compiled a webpage dedicated to Stapley Byne's digitized works.
- The couple was the subject of an unpublished thesis by Victoria Rodriguez Thiessen, Byne and Stapley: Scholars, Dealers, and Collectors of Spanish Decorative Arts (Thesis (M.A.)--Cooper-Hewitt Museum and Parsons School of Design, 1998). Online catalogue record.
