= Francisco Layna Serrano =

Spanish doctor and historian (1893–1971)

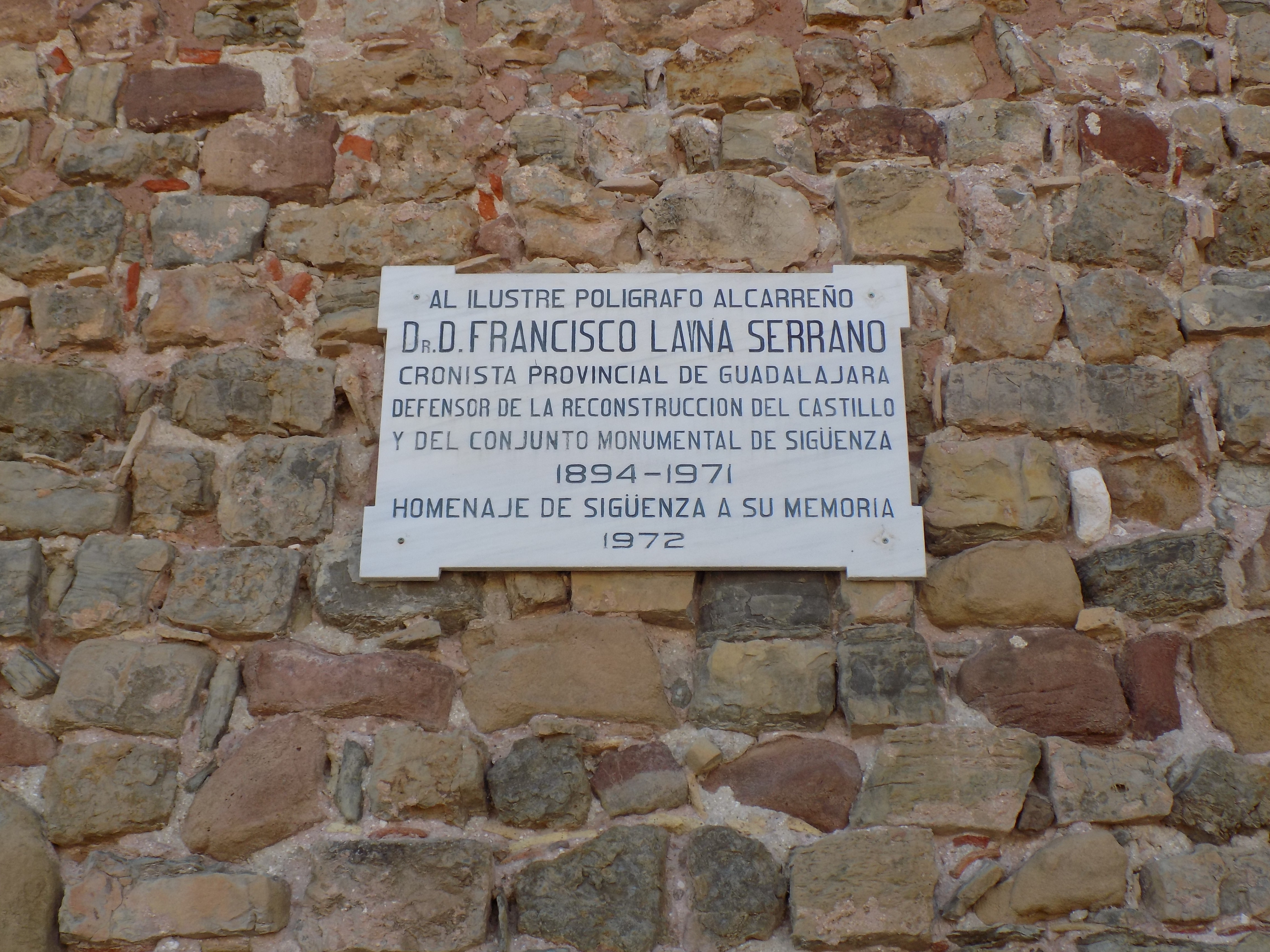

Francisco Layna Serrano (27 June 1893, in Luzón (Guadalajara) – 7 May 1971, in Madrid) was a Spanish medical doctor and historian of Guadalajara Province. His first work was on Santa Maria de Ovila, 1922.

== Works ==
- La arquitectura románica en la provincia de Guadalajara
