= Trillo, Guadalajara =

Trillo
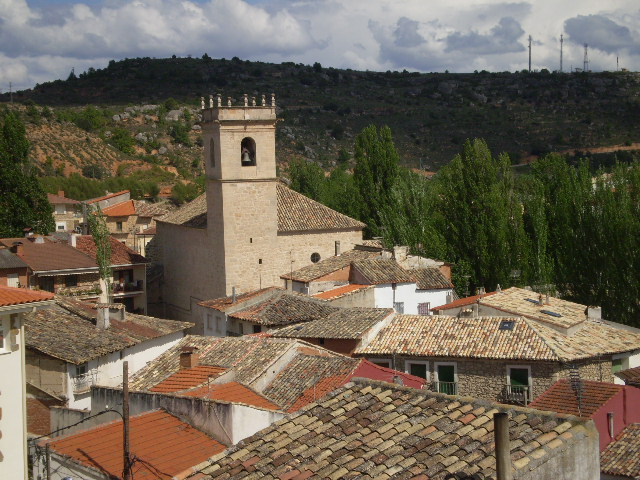

- Coat of arms

- Location within Province of Guadalajara Location within Castilla-La Mancha Location within Spain
- Country: Spain
- Province: Guadalajara
- Municipality: Trillo

Area
  - Total: 161.87 km^{2} (62.50 sq mi)
- Elevation: 732 m (2,402 ft)

Population (2025-01-01)
  - Total: 1,406
- Time zone: UTC+1 (CET)
  - Summer (DST): UTC+2 (CEST)

Trillo is a municipality located in the province of Guadalajara, Spain. According to the 2007 census (INE), the municipality has a population of 1,371 inhabitants.
