= Arthur Byne =

American-born Spanish art and architecture critic

Arthur Byne (25 September 1884 – 1935) is a controversial figure in the history of Spanish art and architecture. Members of the Hispanic Society of America, Byne and his wife, Mildred Stapley Byne, published extensively on the art and architecture of Spain and are credited with promoting Spanish culture and its revival in the United States, yet Byne is also known as a plunderer of Spanish buildings and artefacts.

== Early life and education ==
Born Arthur Gustave Bein in Newark, New Jersey in 1884, he attended Booth Preparatory School and Eaton School. In 1905 Byne was awarded a Certificate of Proficiency in Architecture by the University of Pennsylvania and went on to study at the American Academy in Rome.

== Career ==
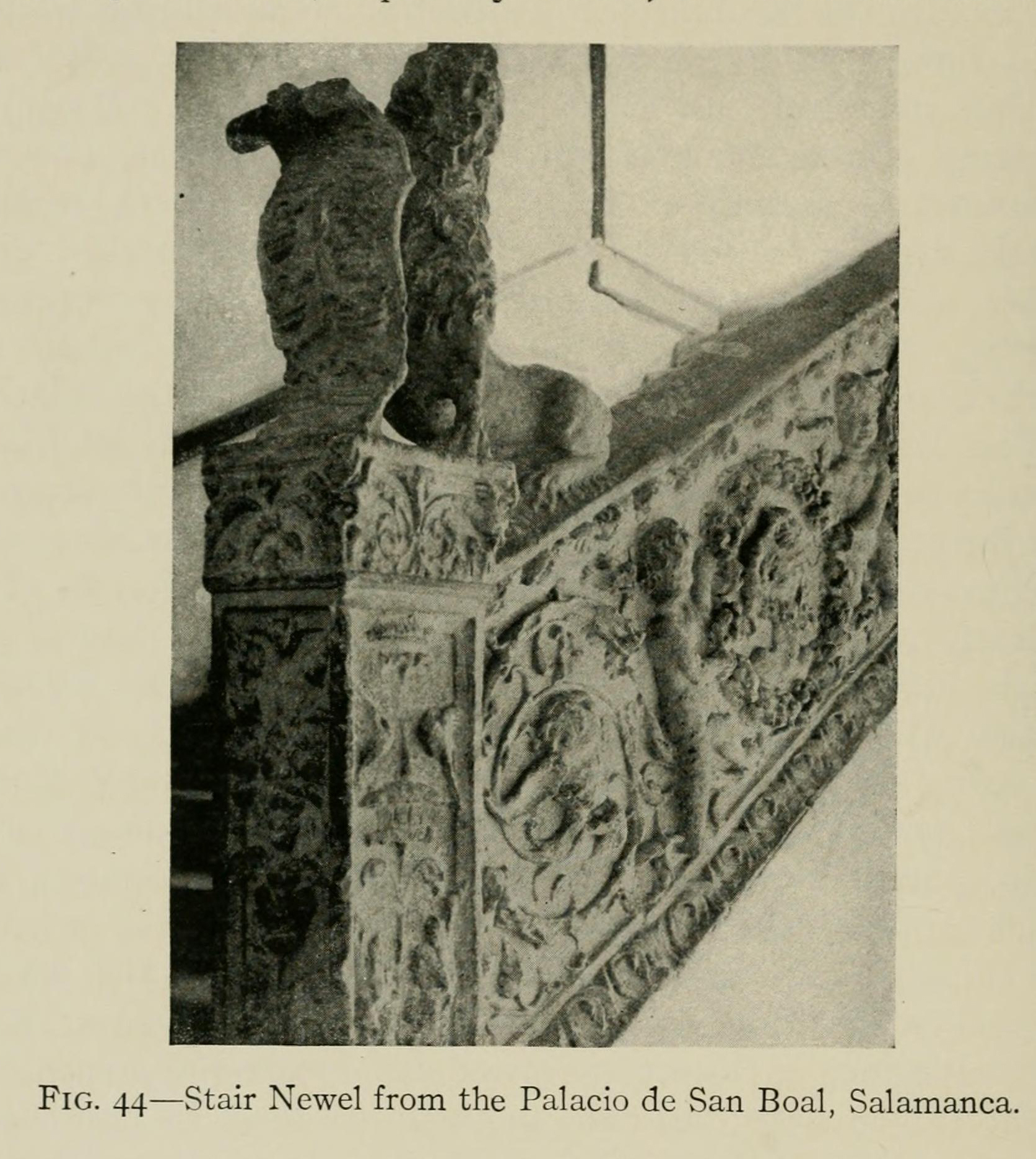
Stair newel from the Palacio de San Boal in Salamanca. Photograph by Byne in the couple's book Spanish Architecture of the Sixteenth Century (1917)

Byne never practiced as an architect although it is recorded that he worked for a short time in the New York architectural firm, Howells and Stokes. Rather, he became a watercolourist, photographer and author; between 1911 and 1920 he illustrated the covers of Architectural Record with drawings of Spanish buildings and photographs taken by him appear in books other than those he authored, for example, in Bridges of the World: Their Design and Construction by Charles S. Whitney. Photographs attributed to Byne, taken in France and Spain, are also held in the Conway Library at The Courtauld Institute of Art, whose archive, of primarily architectural images, is being digitised under the wider Courtauld Connects project.

Both Byne and his wife Mildred Stapley (1875-1941), an art historian in her own right who specialised in Spanish art and architecture, became Corresponding Members of the Hispanic Society in 1914 and acted as the museum's first curators of 'Architecture and Allied Arts' between 1916 and 1918. The Bynes also published a number of books through the Hispanic Society and, in 1916, they were commissioned by Archer Huntingdon, the founder of the society, to embark on a research trip to Spain. Later, Huntington would become disappointed with the Bynes's greed.

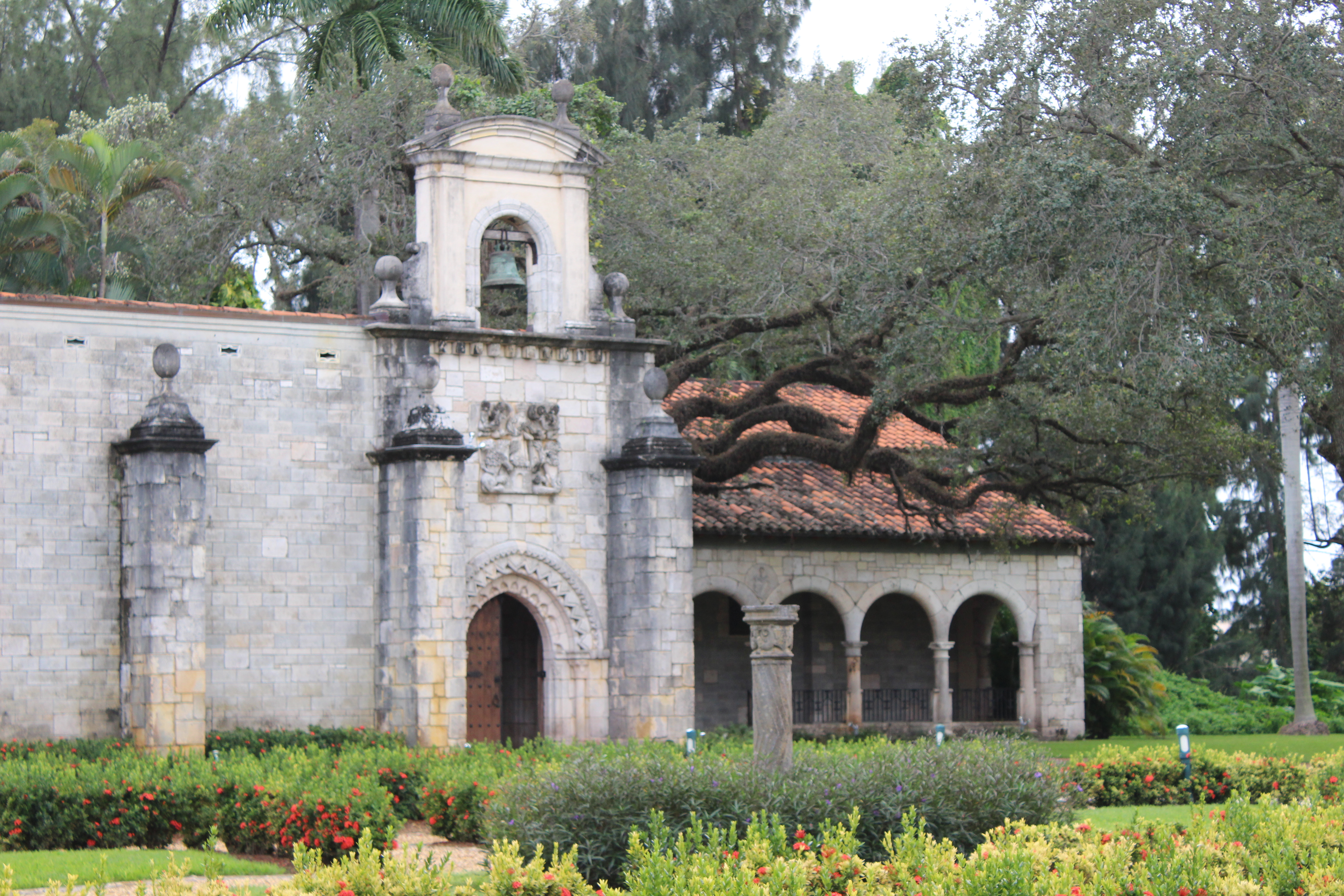
The St. Bernard de Clairvaux Church in Florida in 2015.

By 1914 the Bynes had set up residence in Madrid where they lived for the rest of their lives. Mildred continued with her research work and wrote a number of books and articles in her sole name as well as those published jointly with her husband. Having established himself in society as a connoisseur of Spanish art and architecture, Arthur Byne set up a business as an entrepreneur; an antiquarian who acquired artefacts, art and buildings that he shipped to America. As Jesus Garcia Calero astutely put it in his article in 2012 for the blog Los Grandes Robos de Arte (The Great Art Thefts) “The border between the dealer and the historian, between the agent and the antiquarian is difficult to define…” and Byne exploited this marginal distinction. Arguably Byne's most important and influential client, certainly a very wealthy one, was the newspaper magnate William Randolph Hearst. Byne, acting as agent for Hearst, arranged for two Cistercian monasteries to be dismantled and shipped to America, the Monastery of Saint Bernard of Clairvaux, Sacramenia (now St. Bernard de Clairvaux Church in Florida) purchased by Hearst in 1925 and Santa María de Óvila bought in 1931. Called "a white glove robber" some of Byne's other 'loot', acquired for wealthy clients and exported from Spain, is parts of Benavente Castle, the choir screen from Valladolid Cathedral, gifted to The Metropolitan Museum of Art, New York, by The Hearst Foundation in 1956, and 83 ceilings of Mudéjar origin.

== Personal life ==
Byne died in a car crash in Ciudad Real in 1935 and his wife, who he had married in 1910, died in 1941. Both are buried in the British Cemetery in Madrid at Carabanchel.

The couple were childless and in 1942 their estate was acquired by the US Government including the property at Calle Don Ramón de la Cruz, 3 that the Bynes had purchased in 1931. It is now a diplomatic residence and listed in the Register of Culturally Significant Property owned by the United States Department of State.

== Selected publications ==
- Spanish Interiors and Furniture, (1921-25), new edition, Arthur Byne and Mildred Stapley, New York : Dover Publications, 1969, ISBN 048622502X
- Majorcan Houses and Gardens, a Spanish Island in the Mediterranean, Arthur Byne and Mildred Stapley, New York : William Helburn, 1928
- Provincial Houses in Spain, Arthur Byne and Mildred Stapley, New York : William Helburn, 1925
- Spanish Gardens and Patios, Arthur Byne and Mildred Stapley, Philadelphia; London : J. B. Lippincott Co.; New York : Architectural Record, 1924. Reprinted in 2008
- Spanish Interiors and Furniture, 4 volumes, Arthur Byne and Mildred Stapley, New York : Architectural Book Publishing Company, 1922
- Decorated Wooden Ceilings in Spain, Arthur Byne and Mildred Stapley, New York : Hispanic Society of America, 1920
- Spanish Architecture of the Sixteenth Century, Arthur Byne and Mildred Stapley, New York & London : G. P. Putnam’s Sons, 1917
- Spanish Ironwork, Arthur Byne and Mildred Stapley, New York : Hispanic Society of America, 1915
- Rejería of the Spanish Renaissance, New York : Hispanic Society of America, 1914
