= Luke Wood =

Luke Wood may refer to:

- Luke Wood (cricketer) (born 1995), English cricketer
- Luke Wood (music executive), American musician and music industry executive
- J. Luke Wood (born 1982), president of Sacramento State University
