= Adam Lee (disambiguation) =

Adam Lee is a pen name of author A. A. Attanasio.

Adam Lee may also refer to:

- Adam R. Lee, politician
- Adam S. Lee, FBI agent
- Adam Lee (musician)
