= Judicial Administration Fellowship =

The Judicial Administration Fellowship Program is administered by the Center for California Studies at Sacramento State and co-sponsored by the Judicial Council of California. It is open to all people with a college degree, including recent graduates and mid-career applicants. It is expected that applicants will demonstrate an interest in the judicial system and issues concerning the administration of justice in California courts.

Ten fellows are accepted into the 11-month program which begins in September. The fellowship program is both academic and professional. Upon acceptance into the program, fellows will be enrolled as graduate students in Public Administration at Sacramento State, and attend regularly scheduled academic seminars. Fellows serve as full-time professional staff in Judicial branch offices.

Field assignments will include the Sacramento, San Francisco and Los Angeles offices of the Administrative Office of the Courts, the Judicial Council Office of Governmental Affairs, and county appellate or trial courts.

Fellows are paid a monthly stipend of US$1,972 and receive health, dental and vision benefits.
