= Executive Fellowship =

The Executive Fellowship Program is sponsored by the California State Center for California Studies and the Office of the Governor to provide an experiential learning opportunity in California state government. Fellows work full-time in high levels of the Executive branch and meet weekly for graduate seminars. This program uniquely integrates work experiences with academic and professional development.

== Academic seminar ==
Fellows attend weekly university graduate seminars and earn 12 graduate units in Public Policy and Administration. Seminars provide an academic perspective on policy and administrative issues that are relevant to the public sector. Although some of the units are applicable toward a graduate degree at CSUS, separate application to a specific degree program is required. Other universities accept the units on a case-by-case basis.

== Work experience ==
Executive Fellows are placed in various levels of California's executive branch including offices of the Governor, Constitutional Officers, Cabinet Secretaries, commissions, departments and programs. Placement assignments are made based on a combination of the Fellow's interests, skills and preferences along with the mutual desirability between the fellow and role of the office and the skills of the fellow.

== The fellowship experience ==
The fellowship experience begins with a comprehensive orientation to California state government, including briefings by the Governor's staff, Constitutional Officers, legislative staff, academicians, and others. Fellows also have the opportunity to discuss public policy issues and to get to know each other. Unique to the Executive Branch experience is the inherent range of topics and levels of responsibilities. Because Fellows are placed in offices throughout the branch, they learn not only about state government from their individual experiences, but through the shared experiences of their colleagues.
