= Sustainable Technology Optimization Research Center =

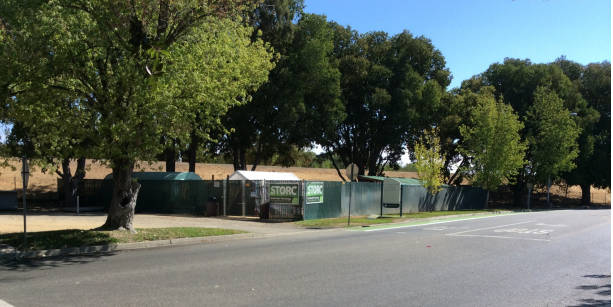
The Sustainable Technology Optimization Research Center

The Sustainable Technology Optimization Research Center (STORC) is a research facility located on the California State University Sacramento campus. There are several players included in operations at the STORC including Sacramento State's Risk Management, the College of Engineering and Computer Science (ECS), and two professors in the Environmental Studies department Brook Murphy and Dudley Burton. The STORC facility is primarily maintained by California State University, Sacramento student interns and volunteers who use applied science and technology to address real world policy, food, health, and energy issues of present-day society. Research at the STORC encompasses engineering and science to test and evaluate new ideas and approaches of sustainable technology to solve environmental problems. Faculty and students address sustainability with an interdisciplinary studies approach. The STORC Vision is to become "an international resource for practical, scalable, and financially viable solutions in the area of sustainable technologies that are suitable for private and/or public sector operations related to the management of energy, food, water, and waste". The STORC Mission is "to demonstrate the operation of innovative commercially viable physical systems that are underpinned by sustainable technologies, and to disseminate the associated plans, public policy discourse, and scientific findings".

== Project purposes ==
Projects at the Sustainable Technology Optimization Research Center are developed as a closed-loop production system. Organic waste acquired from campus eateries is purposefully diverted from landfills where it is then incorporated and processed through several STORC projects turned into high quality protein used to feed fish and plants.

== MTSS ==
STORC successfully operates an almost entirely closed-loop, Multi-Trophic Sustainable System that gathers food waste and introduces it into Compost and Vermicompost systems to produce high protein sources of food for a variety of fish. These fish then produce growth-limiting nutrients necessary for vegetable fertilization. These vegetables and other items are grown at STORC and consumed locally. Produce is also fertilized by use of Compost tea, a liquid solution of concentrated compost nutrients.

The food waste that enters this system is gathered exclusively from restaurants and cafes on the Sacramento State campus. The two main locations on campus that STORC receives their food donations from are Epicure, a restaurant and catering company that specialized in their fresh food, and the Campus Commons, the restaurant that produces fresh food for Sacramento State dormitory inhabitants, students, and guests. The food waste collected considered pre-consumer waste, which is a component of Pre-consumer recycling, where the waste is recycled and never reaches the consumer. Food waste collected from Epicure and the Campus Commons is collected in specialized bins in the kitchens, during food production, then set aside for collection by STORC.

== Funding ==
As of 2016, the facility is funded by an EPA grant funding its sustainable closed-loop food production system. Waste diversion efforts at Sacramento State University are funded by the United States Environmental Protection Agency (USEPA). $15,000 was awarded to fund the aquaponic project at the STORC. Grant funds have been used to research sustainable food growing practices at the STORC while at the same time facilitating the production of vegetables that are distributed to several CSUS campus restaurants.

== STORC projects ==
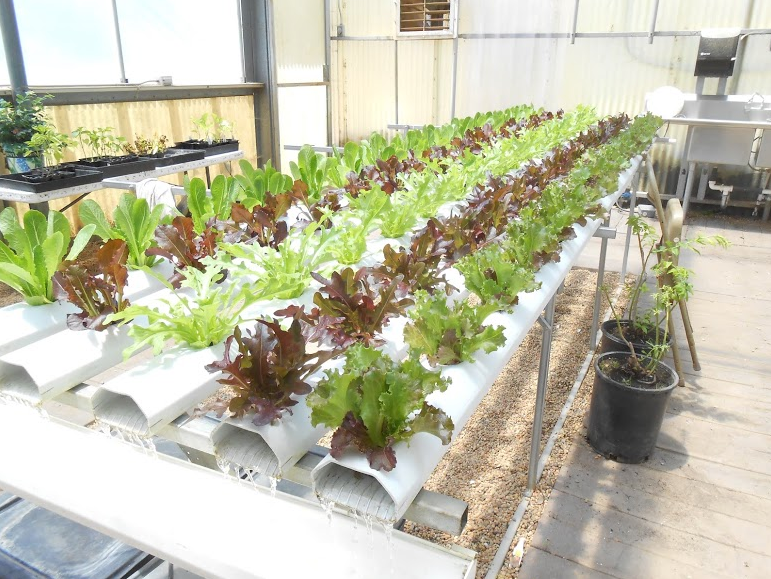
Sustainable produce grown by students involved in the aquaponics project at the STORC.

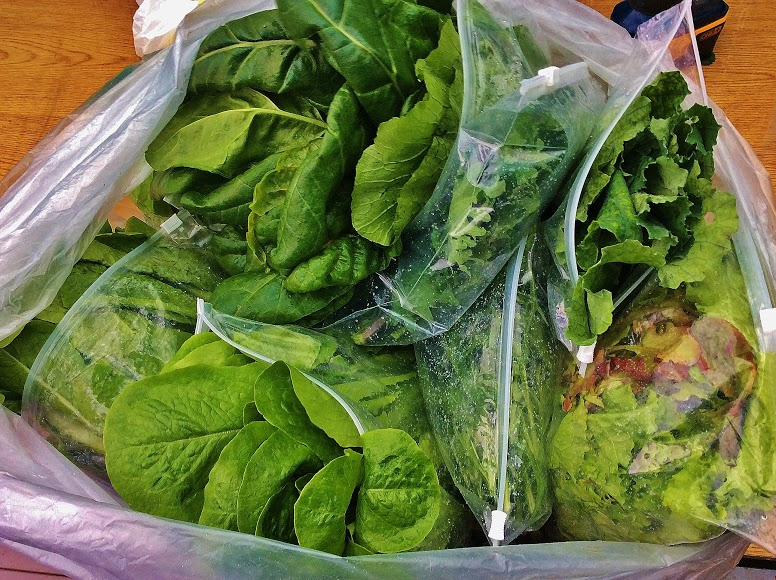
Leafy greens grown by students involved in the aquaponics project at the STORC.

=== Aquaponics ===
STORC aquaponic's project focuses on the Urban Agriculture Method studying how to reduce water use and space needed to grow food in an urban setting. The goal of the aquaponic system at the facility is to gather detailed quantitative and operational parameters creating an example for other aquaponic systems to reference. Nutrient, reproductive, feeding, and environmental factors required by traditional aquaponic systems are addressed as well as pest and disease control strategies. The STORC is developing renewable systems to monitor operational controls such as water and air temperature, air circulation, and data collection. Other objectives of these systems include addressing problems in urban, industrial, and agriculture settings to ascertain knowledge needed to scale-up aquaponic systems that are both cost effective and efficient.

=== Biodiesel production system ===
The Biodiesel production system (BPS) located at the STORC was initiated by a collaboration between Sacramento State's Risk Management Services (RMS) and the College of Engineering and Computer Science (ECS) to convert kitchen waste oil into biodiesel to power equipment used by Facilities Management to maintain Sacramento State's campus.

Studies suggest many benefits of biodiesel production compared to traditional petroleum diesel production. Domestically produced biodiesel is suggested to be an energy secure renewable substitute that is cost effective when compared to petroleum based diesel with benefits including clean air emissions, and improved engine operations. Biodiesel can be produced in large quantities, producing 4.5 units of energy per unit of fossil energy. Biodeisel produced at the STORC is biodegradable, non-toxic, and highly oxygenated improving engine combustion efficiencies while reducing greenhouse gas emissions.

At the Sustainable Technology Optimization Research Center trained students convert used vegetable oil from campus eateries into biodiesel that Facilities Management will then use to maintain campus grounds. Trained interns filter, titrate, process, and purify the kitchen waste oil into biodiesel where it can then be poured into a diesel fuel tank with no alteration to the engine.

=== Vermiculture ===
Vermiculture at the STORC encompasses a seven steps program to convert campus food and landscape waste into high quality compost. Pre-consumer food waste and landscape collected on campus is broken down into smaller material allowing a faster decomposition rate as breaking down the material lessens surface area. Waste is combined into a pile and heated to 130-140 degrees Fahrenheit. The process takes five days allowing microbes to break down weed seeds and pathogens. The microbes begin to break the material down. After the first five days the pile is mixed and heated once again to 130-140 degrees Fahrenheit. The pathogens are now gone and the compost is ready to be utilized by the annelids in the system. The material is then added to the annelid bin where the material will be processes multiple times. The worms eat and reproduce, while this is happening material passes through the tract of the annelids and increases microbial content. When managed and harvested correctly the worm supply is sustainable. After the material passes several times through the annelids tract the material and annelids are separated. Annelids are added to a new compost pile or fed to fish in the aquaponics projects.

The Sustainable Technology Optimization Research Center currently fosters several insects such as Annelids, black soldier flies, and terrestrial Isopoda: Armadillidium vulgare, Porcellio laevis, Porcellio scaber.

=== Composting ===
Composting is the process of taking organic solid waste, like food, paper and landscaping waste and allowing it to be broken down by microorganisms, creating a nutrient rich fertilizer to be used in food production or in landscaping. Once organic waste is placed in a pile, millions of microorganisms come from the soil to help break down the food waste. There are different types of microorganisms that are found in compost piles, depending on the temperature and pH of the compost pile, which can be determined by the types of waste introduced to the compost pile. In the beginning phase, mesophilic bacteria jump-start the decomposition process by breaking down all of the most easily decompostable material, raising the temperature to a level that the next phase of microorganisms thrive in. In the next phase of decomposition, thermophilic microorganisms further break down fats, proteins and complex carbohydrates. It is during this thermophilic phase that temperatures inside of a compost pile can reach above 60 °C, killing most human pathogens that may have been introduced. Once the maximum temperature has been reached, the thermophilic microorganisms tend to slow down and are replaced with more mesophilic bacteria, which continue organic breakdown. During these phases larger organisms like flies, mites and beetles also aid in the breakdown of organic matter. The time it takes for fresh organic waste to be completely decomposed is dependent on multiple factors: microorganisms present, water content, oxygen content, and surrounding air temperature, for example.

STORC operates two different compost locations, one on the STORC grounds, and one other location on the Sacramento State campus. STORC student interns and volunteers pick up discarded food waste from campus eateries daily and deliver it to both of the composting facilities. Due to the amount of waste diverted from landfills to these compost piles, hundreds of pounds of compost is ready or in the process of becoming ready for various uses. Compost is used to feed and shelter worms in vermiculture bins at STORC, which are then used to feed fish inside of the aquaponics systems. The compost is also used as a main ingredient in STORC-made compost tea, which in turn is used to fertilize plants grown in the aquaponics systems. All compost tea made at Sacramento State is made from steeping STORC compost with molasses and other ingredients to produce an ultra-concentrated liquid fertilizer.

=== Aquaculture ===
While many commercial aquaponics systems use fish that can easily be sold for food, the species used at STORC were not chosen with that consideration in mind. CSUS Biology professor Dr. Ron Coleman was a consultant for STORC as they were choosing the specific types of fish species they would be using in the aquaponics systems. Carp, catfish, bass, bluegill, and Sacramento perch are all common fish species that are found in the numerous aquaponic tanks at STORC. All of these species were chosen for their native status in the Western United States and due to the ease at which they grow in captivity.

In an effort to repopulate an endangered species, STORC contains a system inhabited by Sacramento perch. The perch existence as STORC is considered a restoration effort, due to their endangered status granted by the International Union for Conservation of Nature. Commonly used in California aquaponics systems, once grown and released, the Perch ideally thrive and add new genetic diversity to existing populations in the Sacramento-San Joaquin River Delta area. Studies have shown that when raised in captivity, Perch tend to prefer to eat mosquito larvae, which could potentially aid in the reduction of diseases spread by mosquitoes.

Catfish are very easy to keep in captivity, since they tend to thrive in warmer climates, like the Mediterranean climate of Sacramento.

=== Hydroponics ===
Hydroponics is the process of growing plants in nutrient-rich water, without the use of soil. At STORC, the largest hydroponics systems not involving aquaculture is used to grow plant seedlings. Nearly all plants grown at STORC begin in the seedling hydroponics system and remain there in labeled PVC pipe halves until they are large enough to be transplanted into the larger aquaponics beds, taking the place of fully mature plants that are ready for harvesting. In this specific hydroponics system, nutrient-rich water is slowly trickled into a series of PVC pipe halves, where seedlings are starting to take root to small pebbles. These pipes are angled slightly down so that the nutrient-rich water can be recycled and not lost immediately to the Hydrologic Cycle.

All plants grown in aquaponics beds at STORC begin in these containers, as transplanting these seedlings from soil to a non-soil environment would be a detriment to the entire system. STORC's largest crop are its lettuces, but strawberries and herbs are also very commonly found growing.

=== Energy technology ===
Wind power is generated by a wind tower located at the Sustainable Technology Optimization Research Center. The wind tower was installed during the winter 2015-2016 intersession.

=== Water technology: Engineered soils ===
The California State Water Resources Control Board currently funds the Engineered Soils project at the Sustainable Technology Optimization Research Center. This project was implemented at the STORC to initiate engineered soil designs for local public agencies to reduce issues relating to Low-Impact Development. Storm water runoff can carry harmful pollutants impacting wildlife, vegetation, recreational areas, and drinking water. Low Impact Development (LID) is an approach to minimized storm water pollution keeping runoff close to source. Efforts at the STORC include engineering soil designs to reduce barriers associated with Low Impact Development such as nutrient export issues, groundwater contamination, and information regarding treatment of pollutants is lacking.

== Engineering initiatives ==
Sustainable engineering projects at the Sustainable Technology Optimization Research Center focus on technology and building designs that will support sustainable food systems in an urban setting. Sacramento State University interns, volunteers, and engineering students work together to designs and construct sustainable projects with the goal of reducing cost, energy, and space required to grow sustainable protein sources. Engineered systems at the STORC include the Biodiesal Production, aquaponics, vermiculture, compost, and greenhouse systems.

== Why the STORC ==
The Sustainable Technology Optimization Research Center at Sacramento State University addresses future food security problems associated with global climate variation. Globally, sustainable technology and agricultural questions are being address. Proceedings of the National Academy of Sciences of the United States of America published an article estimating that food demands will increase 100-110% by 2050, adding that the environmental impact of this kind of agriculture expansion may be large, depending on the type of expansion that occurs. The Sustainable Technology Optimization Research Center specifically addresses viable technology and growing practices that would conserve land, reduce amount of land used, and grow healthy sustainable food in the future. Initiatives at the Sustainable Technology Optimization Research Center address issues such as urban growth and the development of sustainable food growing practices that could be implemented in an urban setting where there is a large food demand and little land to grow. Those working and researching at the STORC. address social, economic, and environmental aspects relating to food demand and the potential of climate variability in the future.

== Educational and interdisciplinary aspects of research ==
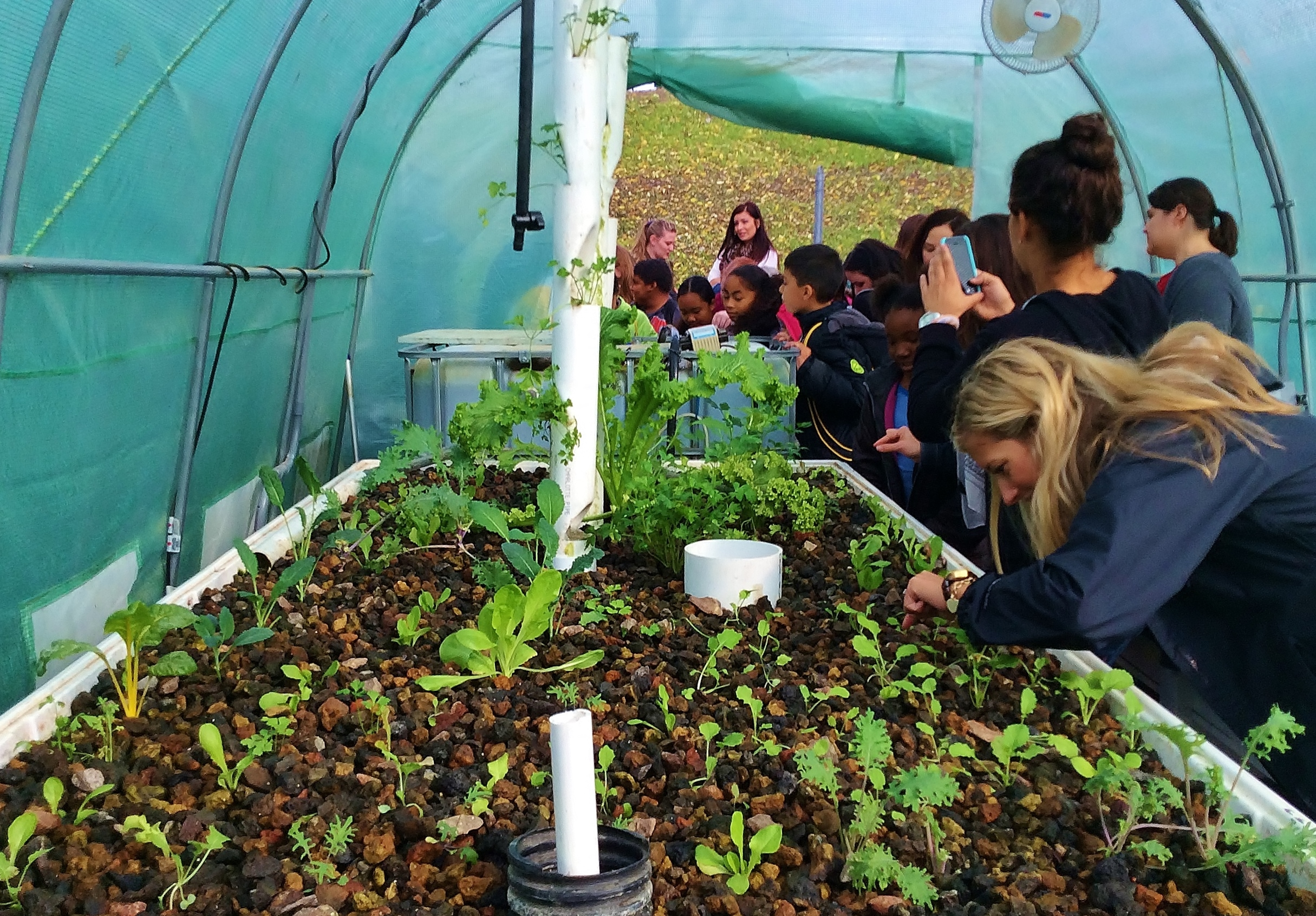
Youth tours at the Sustainable Technology Optimization Research Center

The Sustainable Technology Optimization Research Center is primarily run by Sacramento State Students from diverse disciplinary backgrounds including Economics, Chemistry, Physics, Biology, Government, and Environmental Studies. The educational experience students and visitors receive reflect California State University, Sacramento curriculum of sustainability concepts and practices, water quality and conservation, energy conversion, urban agriculture and aquaponics, and organic and sustainable food production procedures and concepts.

== STORC and the community ==
The Sustainable Technology Optimization Research Center has partnered with community interest groups such as the Sacramento Food Bank for outreach to underserved communities, Luther Burbank High School located in South Sacramento, local urban agriculture organizations, and Keep California Beautiful. The STORCs initiatives to outreach to the community had increased media coverage and governmental communities.

Weekly community and youth tours are given at the Sustainable Technology Optimization Research Center. Tours are led by faculty members and students involved at the STORC and aim to teach the community the relevance of the STORC and how each project works and contributes to the MTSS closed loop system.
