= Adam S. Lee =

FBI agent in charge of Richmond Division

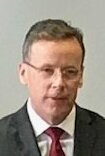
- Education: San Francisco State University, John F. Kennedy University
- Employer: Dominion Energy; Federal Bureau of Investigation

Adam Sidney Lee (born 1968) is a former FBI special agent who was the special agent in charge of the U.S. Federal Bureau of Investigation's Richmond Division from March 2014 until his retirement in November 2018.

== Education ==
Lee graduated from San Francisco State University in 1991 with a B.A. in Liberal Arts and a minor in Criminal Justice. He later earned a J.D. from John F. Kennedy University.

== Career ==
Prior to his appointment at the FBI, worked as a California Senate Fellow.

Lee began his career as an FBI special agent in December 1996 in San Diego Division, where he investigated public corruption and white-collar crime and served for seven years on the division's SWAT team. In September 2005, he was promoted to serve on the Cyber Division's Executive Staff at FBI Headquarters in Washington, D.C.

In July 2007, he transferred to the Washington, D.C. Field Office, where he coordinated the White-Collar Crime Program and supervised the Financial Crimes Squad. He was promoted in August 2009 to assistant special agent in charge of the Washington Field Office's Intelligence Division and managed its Human Intelligence Program. In June 2012, Mr. Lee was promoted to chief of the Public Corruption and Civil Rights Section. He also led the FBI's global Foreign Corrupt Practices Act and Antitrust Programs. He was selected to be special agent in charge of the FBI's Richmond Division in March 2014.

In May 2017, it was reported that Lee was one of eight to be interviewed to succeed James Comey as Director of the Federal Bureau of Investigation.

Lee retired from the FBI in November 2018, to take a position with Dominion Energy in Richmond, Virginia.
