= California State University, Sacramento =

Public university in Sacramento, California, US

Coordinates: 38°33′37″N 121°25′27″W

- Former name: Sacramento State College (1947–1972)
- Motto: "Redefine the Possible"
- Type: Public university
- Established: September 22, 1947; 79 years ago
- Parent institution: California State University
- Accreditation: WSCUC
- Academic affiliations: Space-grant
- Endowment: $96.41 million (2024-25)
- Budget: $438.6 million (2024-25)
- President: J. Luke Wood
- Provost: Carlos Nevarez
- Faculty: 1,771
- Administrative staff: 1,270
- Students: 30,883 (fall 2024)
- Undergraduates: 28,222 (fall 2024)
- Postgraduates: 2,661 (fall 2024)
- Location: Sacramento, California, United States
- Campus: 305 acres (123 ha); Large city
- Newspaper: The State Hornet
- Colors: Green and gold
- Nickname: Hornets
- Sporting affiliations: NCAA Division I FBS – Big West; MAC
- Mascot: Herky the Hornet
- Website: www.csus.edu

California Historical Landmark
- Reference no.: 697

California State University, Sacramento (CSUS, Sacramento State, or informally Sac State) is a public university in Sacramento, California, United States. Founded in 1947 as Sacramento State College, it is part of the California State University system.

The university enrolls approximately 30,100 students annually, with 30,833 enrolled in the fall of 2024. It also has an alumni base of more than 290,000 and awards 9,000 degrees annually. The university offers 151 different bachelor's degree programs, 69 master's degree programs, 28 types of teaching credentials, and 5 doctoral degree programs.

The campus sits on 305 acres (123 ha), covered with over 3,500 trees and over 1,200 resting in the University Arboretum. The university is home to one site of the National Register of Historic Places, the Julia Morgan House.

Sacramento State is federally recognized as both a Hispanic-Serving Institution (HSI) and an Asian American Native American Pacific Islander Serving Institution (AANAPISI). The institution was also recognized by the California Legislative Assembly as the first Black-Serving Institution (BSI) in the state of California. The Arbor Day Foundation officially declared the university a "Tree Campus USA" in 2012.

== History ==
=== Early years ===
The efforts to get a four-year university in Sacramento date back to the 1920s; however, legislation repeatedly failed. Local supporters blamed "pork barrel politics" by Bay Area legislators trying to monopolize higher education. Sacramento State was formally established in 1947 through legislation by State Senator Earl D. Desmond, by playing hardball to get it done – convincing the Senate's finance committee to withhold funding for the University of California until he had a commitment. Later on, Desmond eventually had 11 children and grandchildren graduate from the college.

Founded as Sacramento State College on September 22, 1947, during a time of intense demand for higher education after World War II, Sacramento State shared space with Sacramento Junior College. Sacramento State's first semester of classes consisted of 235 students enrolled in 44 sections. During December 1947, the official mascot "Herky" (short for Hercules) the Hornet was chosen over the Elk, which wasn't considered to be aggressive enough. The college's colors – green and gold symbolizing the foothills and trees, were also established. The next spring, the college held its first graduation ceremony. A single student, history major John J. Collins, who had transferred from UC Berkeley, graduated. By 1948, the college was already fielding intercollegiate teams in basketball, baseball, and tennis. In spring 1949, the winning "Fight Hornet Fight" song was composed by Donald McDonald. The State Hornet and Statesman yearbook were first published in 1949.

Several sites for a permanent home for the college were considered. A site at 5th Street and Broadway, a site near Fruitridge and Stockton Boulevard, and a site in the Pocket Area of South Sacramento were all rejected. In 1949, the state purchased 244 acres of what was then peach farm land to be the site of the new college at $1,650 to $1,800 an acre. In December 1952, the school left the Sacramento City College property and moved to its permanent location on the banks of the American River. On February 9, 1953, the then 289-acre campus opened to approximately 2,400 students with a parade through town called "GO EAST WITH WEST", in reference to President West. Parking has notoriously been a problem at the university, and since the beginning, drivers were confronted by a sea of mud. Students would simply drive as close to the buildings as they could and park.

Construction began in 1951. By 1962, 30 new structures had been built and occupied. A campus landmark was created when the Guy West Bridge was erected – a bridge modeled after the Golden Gate Bridge and named after the college's founding president.

In 1955, the first Hornet football team scored its first victory, against Southern Oregon College. Jackrabbits were a problem in the early years and landscapers were permitted to shoot them on sight through the 1960s. In 1972, the school became California State University, Sacramento. In 2004, it formally adopted Sacramento State as its primary name; it had been used in athletics for some time. Today, Sacramento State is the only major four-year comprehensive university in the city of Sacramento.

The university underwent a major expansion in the Korean War years, with the 'heart' of the campus residing in Douglass Hall, Shasta Hall, Sacramento Hall (the administration building).

In 1975, the University Union opened its doors, originally comprising 65,000 sq ft (6,000 m^{2}). In 1981, the Sacramento State Aquatic Center was established. The Center for California Studies was established the following year. In 1986, Sacramento State established a Master Plan that called for over $100 million in growth. During that same year, the university came within hours of being deliberately flooded as officials contemplated blowing floodgates to avoid a massive levee failure in Sacramento.

The 1990s saw additional growth, constructing more than 1.2 million square-feet of space. In 1992, Hornet Stadium was renovated, providing capacity for 26,000 patrons. In 1996, students passed a referendum to build a RWEC Center (Recreation, Wellness, and Event Center, later shortened to "the WELL"). The original plans for the center were to house a new basketball stadium; it was later modified to include other student amenities such as a campus gym. Cost overruns halted the construction of the basketball facility, and the original vision of the WELL was not seen until 2025, when the basketball facility was finally added 30 years later.

In 2000 and 2004, the campus hosted the U.S. Olympic Track and Field Trials. In 2003, Dr. Alexander Gonzalez was appointed the 11th president of the university. In his first year, he launched Destination 2010, an initiative focusing on reforming academic programs and constructing new facilities.

In 2007, the faculty overwhelmingly (77% of ballots) approved a "No Confidence" vote for President Alexander Gonzalez. The vote expressed anger over the President's handling of finances, including a $6.5 million structural deficit the university is facing. They also accused him of pumping money into student recruitment and promotion rather than academic affairs. In response to the vote Gonzalez publicly replied, "in the 28 years I have been a part of the California State University...I have yet to encounter the level of incivility, mean-spiritedness and outright distortion that I have found among some members of the Sacramento State community. It embarrasses and saddens me."

Similarly in 2011, then Sacramento State Police Chief Daniel Davis also received a "No Confidence" vote by 14 out of 15 sworn in officers. The vote came amid seven alleged sexual assaults that occurred the prior fall semester. This was also the second time the police force voiced concerns about the police chief's mismanagement.

=== Today ===
Sacramento State is organized into seven academic colleges and a college of continuing education. The university is also a member of the consortium that operates Moss Landing Marine Laboratories, offering curricula in marine sciences. The university is developing expanded applications of technology to learn through computerized and televised instruction over a wide area of Northern California.

The university reached an important strategic milestone. Sacramento State launched Destination 2010, an initiative focused on creating excellent academic programs, new student facilities and a more welcoming campus culture and environment. During that time, the campus constructed the four-story Academic Information Research Center, Parking Structure III (which at 3,000 spaces is the largest in the CSU system), the new Hornet Bookstore, Eli and Edythe Broad Athletic Fieldhouse, and the American River Courtyard residence hall (with 600 beds).

Many new buildings and other structural improvements are currently underway or recently completed including:

- The Ernest E. Tschannen Science Complex: The science complex opened in fall 2019. A state-of-the-art building complete with a 2,500-square-foot planetarium and open-roof observatory, it is available to students and the public.
- University Union expansion: A 72,500-square-foot expansion of the University Union was completed in 2019. The renovation accommodates the growing campus population, providing informal recreation space, student offices, campus group meeting rooms, special-event space, casual seating, and a new coffee shop.
- The WELL expansion: Completed in January 2020, the renovation added square footage and renovate current spaces in both the Campus Recreation and Student Health and Counseling areas. Highlights include expanded locker room capacity, additional strength group fitness studios, lounge and free weight fitness space.
- Riverview Hall: Opened in August 2017, the $53 million residence hall is home to 416 first- and second-year students. It was built to LEED Gold specifications.
- Parking Structure 5: $42 million. Parking for 1,750 vehicles. It is one of the first in the CSU.
- Hornet Commons Residence Hall: As part of an ongoing effort to provide more on-campus housing, this $164 million housing project for upper-division students boasts 284 apartments and 1,100 beds in a six four-story buildings surrounding a swimming pool and a resident's common building. It was completed in fall 2021.

Many prominent people have lectured or performed at Sacramento State, including Martin Luther King Jr. (1967), Jimi Hendrix (1968), Genesis (1992, "largest concert ever ... the first and last to play" in Hornet Stadium), Sheryl Crow (1995), Jesse Jackson (1998), Woody Harrelson (2001), Oliver Stone (2006), John Kerry (2004), Wangari Maathai (2009), Maya Soetoro-Ng (2009) and Chuck D (2010).

=== Doctoral degrees ===
In 1999, Sacramento State was given authority to award its first ever Doctoral degree, unique at the time in the California State University System. In the past, authority to award any sort of degree beyond Master's in California's higher public education was given solely to the University of California. The program would be a joint PhD in history with the University of California, Santa Barbara. However, this program later phased out due to declining enrollment.

The university was given authority again to award its first ever Doctorate in Education (Ed.D.) degree in 2007, with its first graduating class in 2010. Since its establishment, the program has branched into several focuses offering different types of degrees.

In 2012, the university was accredited to award its first Doctor of Physical Therapy (DPT), with the first class entering in fall of 2012. The program is highly competitive, with over 400 applications for just 32 seats. This program eventually will fade out the Master's in Physical Therapy by 2015, following standards set by the Commission on Accreditation in Physical Therapy Education.

In 2019, the university added its most recent doctoral degree, a Doctor of Audiology (Au.D). Sacramento State is one of four CSUs to receive approval of the proposed doctorate of audiology degree along with San Jose, Northridge, and Los Angeles.

=== Renaming ===
In 2004, the university re-branded itself as Sacramento State, or Sac State for short, though students had been referring to the school as "Sac State" for years. The formal name is California State University, Sacramento. The university's marketing unit discourages the use of CSUS, Cal State Sacramento, Sacramento State University, CSU Sacramento and CS Sacramento, even though the university's web address is csus.edu. The university also adopted a new logo and seal that replaced the previous design based on the Seal of California. In addition, the exact shades of Sacramento State's colors of green and gold were formalized in the 2005 Style Guide.

== Admissions and enrollment ==
Undergraduate admission statistics
	Fall 2025	Fall 2024	Fall 2023	Fall 2022	Fall 2021
First-time Freshmen
Applicants	26,342	27,868	26,114	25,550	22,706
Admits	24,648	26,036	24,336	23,559	21,272
Admit rate	94%	93%	93%	92%	94%
Enrolled	3,745	3,989	3,884	3,915	3,581
Yield rate	15%	15%	16%	17%	17%
Transfers
Applicants	12,472	12,124	10,387	11,654	13,716
Admits	11,218	11,230	9,429	10,366	12,381
Admit rate	90%	93%	91%	89%	90%
Enrolled	4,317	4,386	3,494	3,734	4,453
Yield rate	38%	39%	37%	36%	36%

Some 44,733 students applied to Sacramento State for the fall 2019 semester, marking the record number of applications in one semester. Following a CSU-wide trend, the university has seen growth over the past few years in the number of applications.

The campus is consistently one of the top three destinations among all universities in the state for California Community College transfer, welcoming more than 4,300 new students each academic year.

Sacramento State historically attempts to admit the top 1/3 of California high school graduates. For students entering fall 2018, 19,653 freshmen were accepted out of 27,105 applicants, a 72.5% acceptance rate. Enrolled freshmen had an average high school GPA of 3.4.

For transfer students, Sacramento State accepted 11,248 of 13,578 applicants in the fall of 2018, an 82.8% acceptance rate. The average transfer GPA for fall 2018 was 3.2.

=== Enrollment ===
Around 30% of incoming freshman live on-campus in the dorms. For the fall 2012 semester, just about 50% of incoming freshman came from the Sacramento Region, while around 18% came from the San Francisco Bay Area, an additional 13% came from the Northern CA Foothills, and the remaining came in from Southern California (14.4%), other parts of the United States (0.8%), or Foreign Countries (0.4%).

The average course load of all undergraduate students is 12.2 units, classified as a full-time student. For the most recent commencement, the average number of years taken to complete degrees of the class was 4.8, while the average number of units accumulated was 132 (12 above what is needed for a bachelor's). As of fall 2018 CSU Sacramento has the third largest enrollment percentage of Pacific Islander Americans and African Americans in the Cal State system.

== Campus ==
=== On-campus ===
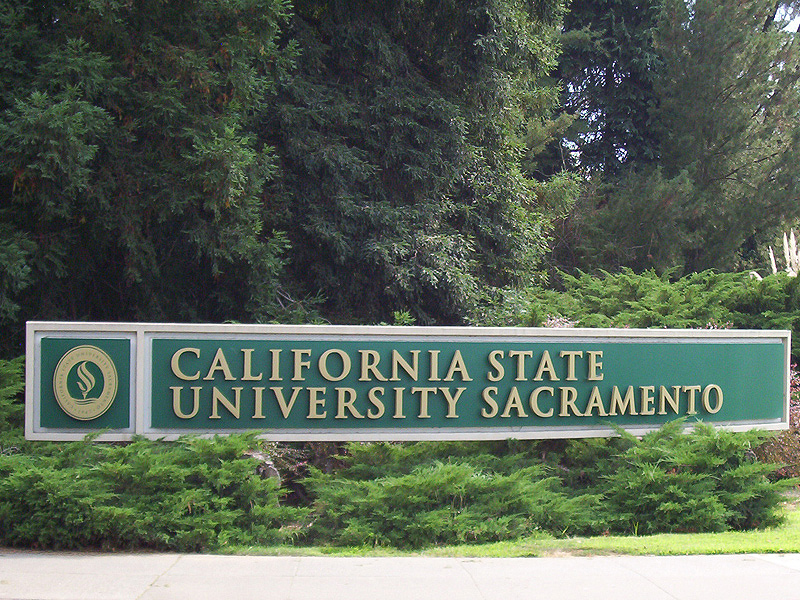
Sacramento State north entrance

Undergraduate demographics as of Fall 2023
Race and ethnicity	Total
Hispanic	39%
White	22%
Asian	20%
Black	6%
Two or more races (Note: Other consists of Multiracial Americans & those who prefer to not say.)	6%
Unknown	3%
Foreign national	2%
Pacific Islander	1%
Economic diversity
Low-income (Note: The percentage of students who received an income-based federal Pell grant intended for low-income students.)	57%
Affluent (Note: The percentage of students who are a part of the American middle class at the bare minimum.)	43%

As the sixth-largest campus of the 23 state universities in California, the main campus is composed of 305 acres (123 ha) in the city of Sacramento and lies adjacent to U.S. Route 50.

The campus is bordered by the American River to the East, Union Pacific Railroad tracks to the West, Folsom Boulevard to the South and H Street to the North. The North end of campus is dominated by the University Arboretum, and residence halls.

Officially "Tree Campus USA" by the Arbor Day Foundation, Sacramento State has more than 3,500 trees, with flower gardens, miles of trails stretching along the nearby river parkway, and student housing with recreational areas such as Lake Natoma and Old Sacramento, in addition to its on-campus housing.

Guy West Bridge, a pedestrian bridge inspired by the Golden Gate Bridge, spans the nearby American River.

There are more than 30 research and community service centers on campus such as the Center for California Studies, the Institute for Social Research, the Center for Collaborative Policy, the Center for Small Business, and the Office of Water Programs.

At the northeastern edge of campus are the dormitories which can currently accommodate 1,700 students. Southwest of the campus is the Upper Eastside Lofts located near the light rail station at Folsom Boulevard and 65th Street and is owned by University Enterprises. The lofts can accommodate an additional 443 students and is a short walk from campus via Hornet Tunnel. The university also purchased a piece of land south of the campus, Romana Site, and plans to construct housing for faculty and students in an apartment style housing complex that will be a close walk to campus.

==== Library ====
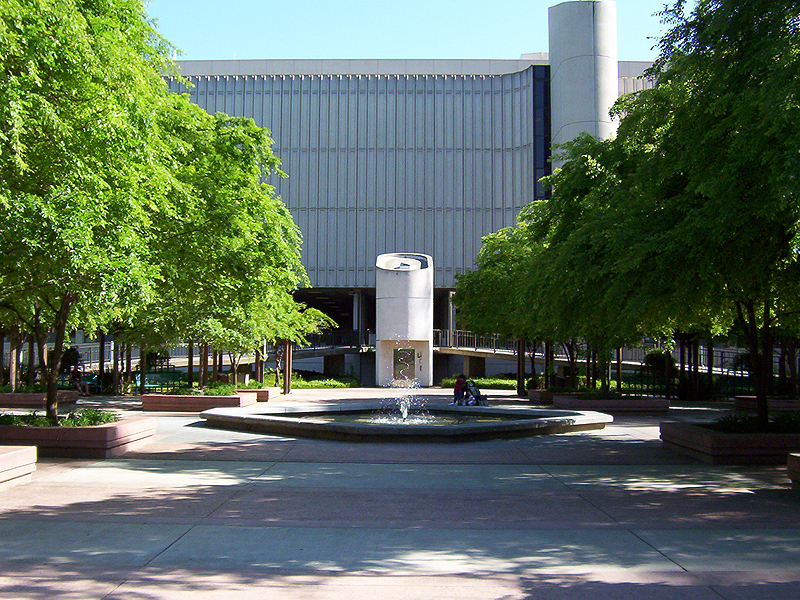
Library

==== Student Housing ====
The Housing complex houses approximately 2,129 students consisting of five three-story Residence Halls Riverview Hall, and the American River Courtyard, surrounding a central Dining Commons (DC) and quad area.

=== Off-campus ===
==== Sacramento State Aquatic Center ====
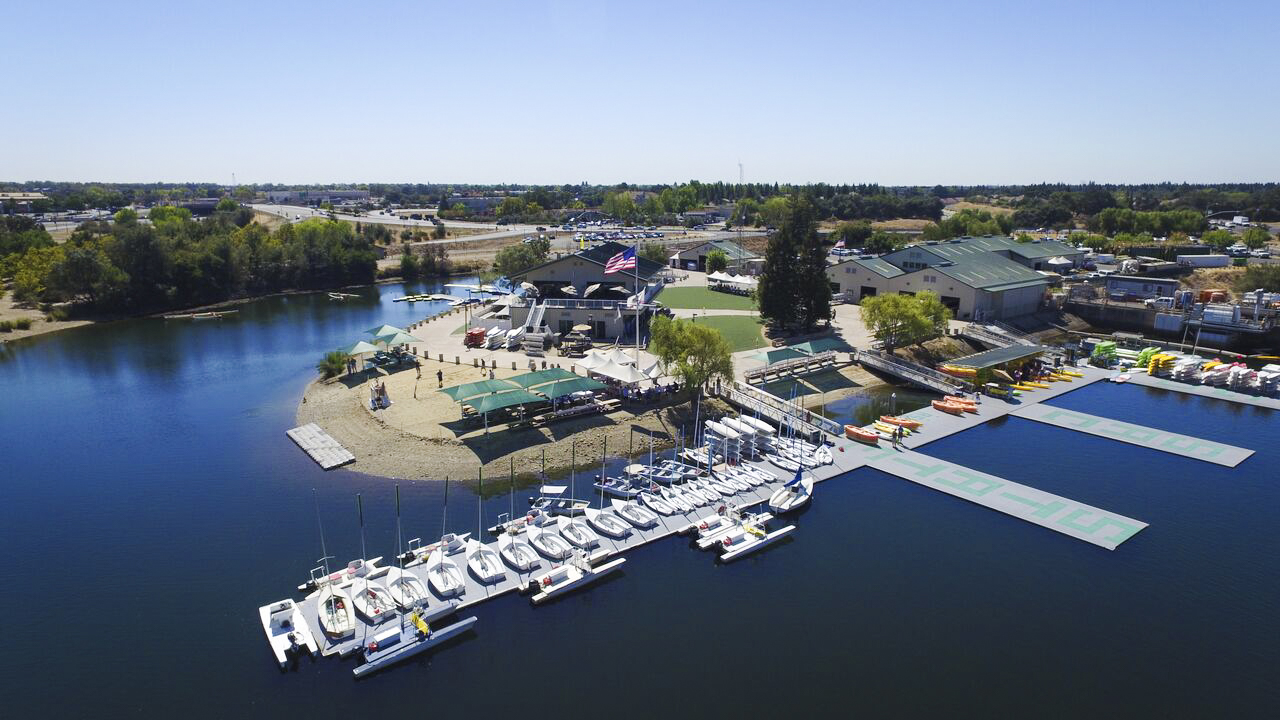

Located on Lake Natoma, 15 miles (24 km) east of the university right next to Nimbus Dam, the Sacramento State Aquatic Center is a cooperative operation of the Associated Students of California State University, Sacramento, University Union of Sacramento State, California Department of Boating and Waterways, and the California Department of Parks and Recreation. The center was established in 1981 and has provided instruction to thousands of students. The center houses the Sacramento State Rowing Team, and is the training destination for many other university rowing teams and clubs. The center hosts several national championships, including the Pac 10 Rowing Championships, Pacific Coast Rowing Championships, NCAA Women's Rowing Championships, IRA National Rowing Championship, and the West Coast Conference Rowing Championship.

==== Julia Morgan House Event and Conference Center ====
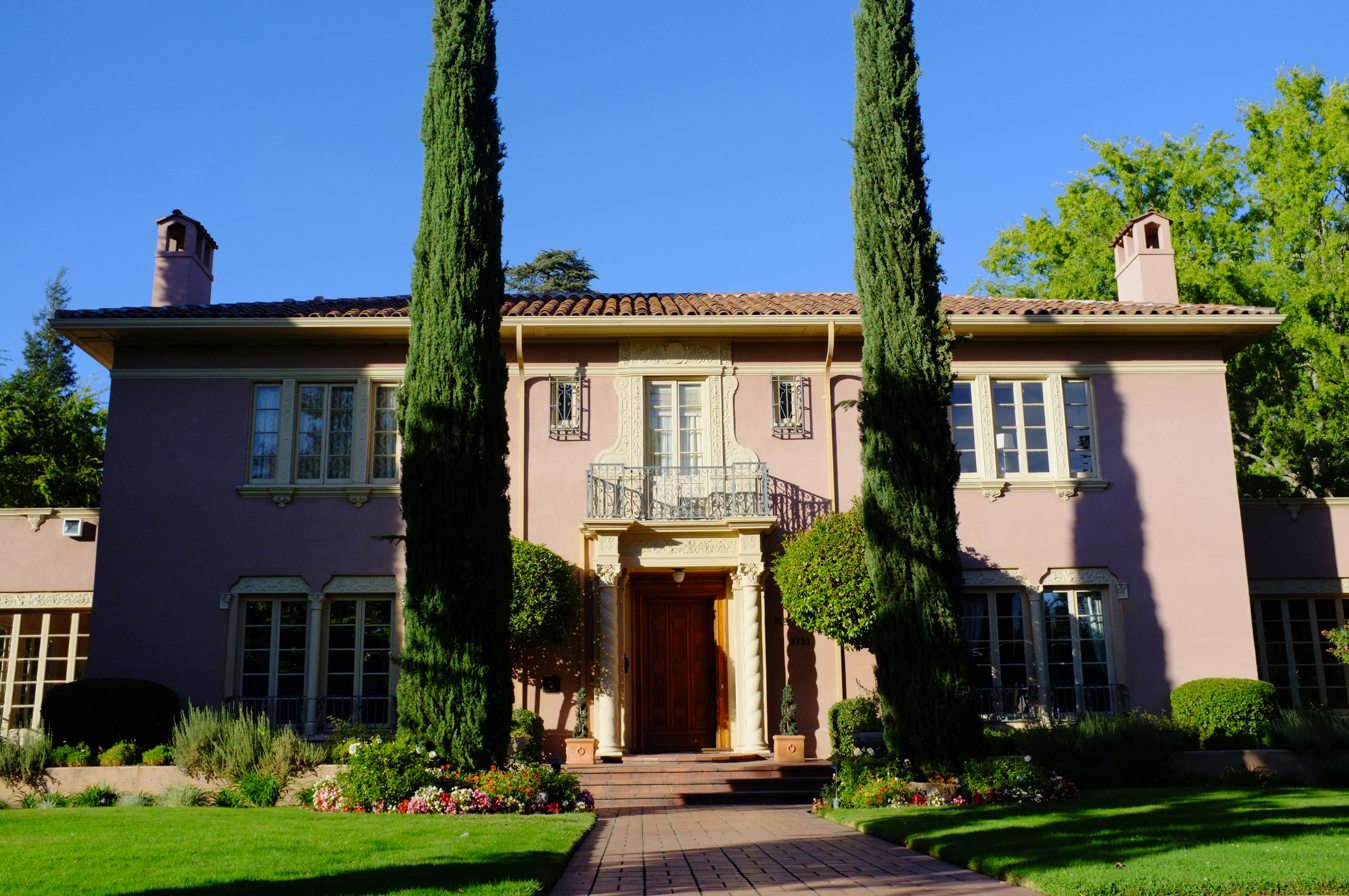
Julia Morgan House

Located three miles (5 km) west of Sacramento State and was designed by famous architect Julia Morgan. It was donated to the school in 1966 and was placed in the National Register of Historic Places in 1982. The school remodeled the house in 2000 honored by the California Heritage Council. Sacramento State uses the home to host lectures, small meetings, conferences, and campus events.

== Academics ==
=== Accreditation ===
Since 1951, the university has been accredited by the Western Association of Schools and Colleges. Sacramento State is a Space-grant university and is an affiliate institution of the National Space Grant College and Fellowship Program, sponsoring an outreach program to girls and minorities for excellency in Engineering and Computer Science. The school is a member of the Association of Public and Land-grant Universities. The university is nationally and internationally accredited in specific specialized programs including the Association to Advance Collegiate Schools of Business (AACSB) for Business programs, the Academy of Nutrition and Dietetics for Didactic programs in Dietetics, the American Physical Therapy Association for professional programs in Physical Therapy Administration, the American Speech-Language-Hearing Association for programs in Audiology and Speech-Language Pathology, the Commission on Collegiate Nursing Education for various Nursing (CNURED) programs, the National Association of Schools of Art and Design, the National Association of Schools of Music, and the National Association of Schools of Theatre. Counselling programs are accredited by The Council for Accreditation of Counseling and Related Educational Programs. The School Psychology program is accredited by the National Association of School Psychologists.

=== Colleges ===
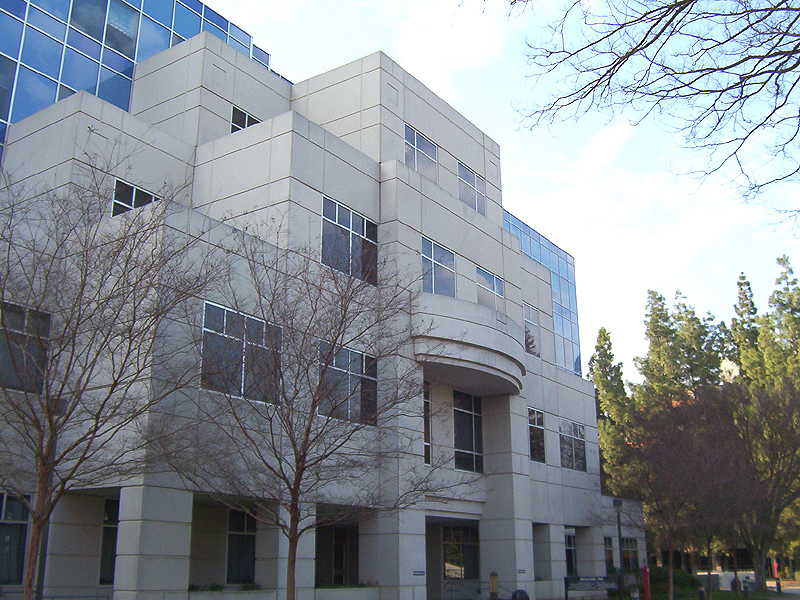
Riverside Hall houses the College of Engineering and Computer Science

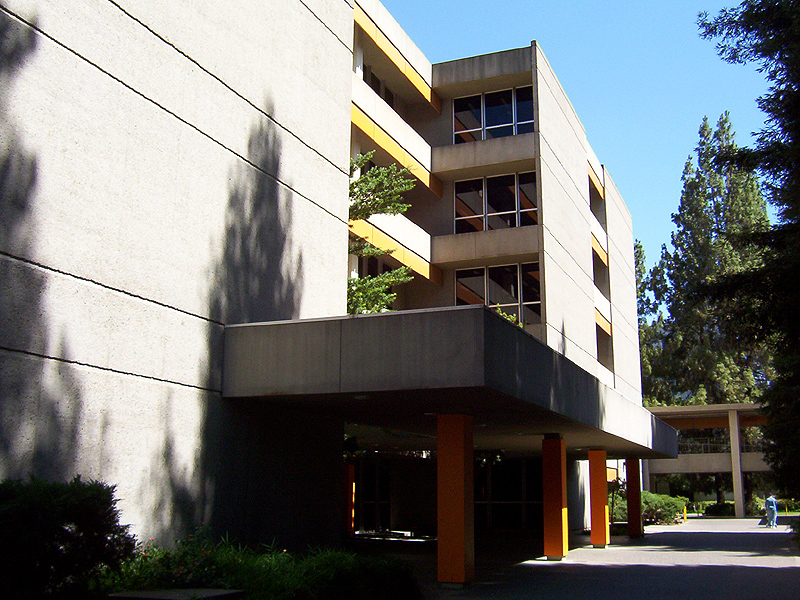
Sequoia Hall houses the College of Natural Sciences & Mathematics

The university comprises the following colleges:

- Arts & Letters
- Business
- Continuing Education
- Education
- Engineering & Computer Science
- Health & Human Services
- Natural Sciences & Mathematics
- Social Sciences & Interdisciplinary Studies

Sacramento State's largest academic major for undergraduates is nursing with nearly 2,000 students, followed by criminal justice with 1,800 students in the department, psychology with 1,600 enrolled, Biological Sciences with over nearly 1,500 students, and Accounting with over 1,200 students.

With nearly 2,700 students, the university's division of Public Affairs is the largest in the California State University (CSU). The university is home to the largest Chemistry program within the CSU with over 400 students. Along with CSUN, it is the only university in California to offer a bachelor's degree in Deaf Studies.

The average class size throughout the university is 38 students. The student-to-faculty ratio is about 28 to 1. (22,461 FTE students to 803 FTE faculty). Most transfer students come from two-year colleges, and about 750 international students from 80 nations. Approximately 160 students from India study abroad at the university, the largest country represented. The school has the largest cooperative education program in the entire state. Students from all majors are placed in paid positions while simultaneously receiving academic credit. Many students work in government-related internships and fellowships. Approximately 36% of students work as volunteers. With nearly 1,800 undergraduate and graduate students, its criminal justice program is one of the largest in all of North America. The school's College of Engineering and Computer Science is the only university in California to offer a master's degree in Electrical Engineering, and is designated as a national center of cyber-security. The university along with Chico State offers CSU's only Electronic engineering degree option. Sacramento State is the only campus in the CSU to offer a bachelor's degree in Cinematic Arts, Digital cinematography and professional performance. The College of Business Administration is accredited by the Association to Advance Collegiate Schools of Business.

=== Rankings ===
Academic rankings

Master's
- Washington Monthly: 5

Regional
- U.S. News & World Report: 27 (tie)

National
- Forbes: 151
- WSJ/College Pulse: 71

Global
- U.S. News & World Report: 1,279 (tie)

National Program Rankings
Economics (undergraduate)	254 (tie)
Engineering (undergraduate)	30 (tie)
Nursing (undergraduate)	154 (tie)
Nursing: Master's	114 (tie)
Physical Therapy (graduate)	106 (tie)
Rehabilitation Counseling (graduate)	88 (tie)
Social Work (graduate)	120 (tie)
Speech-Language Pathology (graduate)	124 (tie)

Global Subject Rankings
Physics	454 (tie)

- Sacramento State is the 4th most diverse university in the western United States among regional schools offering some masters programs but few doctorates.
- The school's bachelor's in gerontology degree is ranked 5th best in the U.S.by College Choice.
- Among western regional schools offering some masters programs but few doctorates, U.S. News & World Report in 2021 ranked Sacramento State tied for 43rd overall out of 127 schools, tied for 20th best public school, tied for 24th best college for veterans, and tied for the 46th best undergraduate engineering program in the western United States.
- Sacramento State was named one of the 'greenest' campuses in the world.
- In March 2018, Sacramento State's Jazz Ensemble was named one of the nation's three best college jazz bands at the Monterey Next Generation Jazz Festival. Downbeat magazine has bestowed two Outstanding Performance awards and another for Outstanding Arrangement to Sac State in its 2018 Student Music Awards of colleges and high schools.
- In 2019, Sacramento State's Master of Science in Accountancy program ranked 3rd nationally for Best Online Program and 6th most affordable by OnlineU.

== Economic impact ==
The university has a significant impact on the Sacramento Region and California statewide economy. It sustains nearly 9,000 jobs in the region and statewide, generates $816 million to the Sacramento economy, and nearly $1 billion to the state economy, with annual spending amongst the campus exceeding $600 million. The campus has the state's largest co-operative education program, placing students in paid positions where they receive academic credit. Biology students help in the Sacramento crime lab with DNA matching while Physical Therapy students are assisting stroke victims regain their mobility, and Government students are staffed at the Capitol. The campus has one of the largest Criminal Justice programs in all of North America with nearly 1,500 undergraduate students and 80 graduate students. Nearly 36% of students volunteer through the Sacramento State Serves program, committing more than 2 million hours of service each year.

== Research centers and institutes ==
The campuses houses over 30 research centers. Notable include:

- California Smart Grid Center (engages in automated metering infrastructure)
- Archaeological Research Center
- Center for African Peace and Conflict Resolution
- Center for California Studies (houses Capitol Fellows)
- Office of Water Programs
- North Central Information Center
- STEM Research
- Sustainable Technology Optimization Research Center

=== CAMP/HEP Center ===
The College Assistance Migrant Program (CAMP)/High School Equivalent Program is one of nearly 50 federally funded assistance programs that is geared to help migrant or seasonal farm workers (or children of them) not currently enrolled in school achieve the equivalent of a high school diploma and then subsequently obtain employment. Sacramento State current has a 5-year, $2.1 million grant that serves 70 incoming freshman and 300 continuing students each year. The program ensures 90% successfully complete their first academic year, and 90% enroll in their second year of college. The program serves more than 7,000 annually.

=== Capital Fellows Program ===
Sacramento State works with the California State government to host the Capital Fellowship program through the Center for California Studies. The Center administers the Jesse M. Unruh Assembly Fellowship, Executive Fellowship, Judicial Administration Fellowship, and California Senate Fellows programs. These programs, known collectively as the Capital Fellows Programs, are nationally recognized. The 18 Assembly Fellows, 18 Senate Fellows, 18 Executive Fellows and 10 Judicial Administration Fellows receive an outstanding opportunity to engage in public service and prepare for future careers, while actively contributing to the development and implementation of public policy in California. The ranks of former fellows and associates include a Justice of the California Supreme Court, members of the United States Congress and the State Legislature, a deputy director of the Peace Corps, corporate executives, and local government and community leaders.

=== Center for Collaborative Policy ===
The Center provides services for public disputes at the state, regional, and local levels, ranging from conflicts between agencies to multi-party disputes on major policies. Its methods are mediation, negotiation, and consensus-building. It tries to reach solutions satisfying everyone while avoiding traditional adversarial processes.

== Athletics ==
Athletics wordmark

The university offers 21 intercollegiate sports. In hopes of expanding its athletics department even further, the university added its 21st sport, Women's Beach Volleyball in the spring of 2013. Sacramento State sports teams participate in NCAA Division I (FBS for College Football). Sacramento State's colors are green and gold, its nickname is Hornets, its commonly used phrase is Stingers Up! and its mascot is Herky the Hornet.

Conference breakdowns are as follows:

- Mid American Conference (MAC): Football
- Big West Conference: Men's Soccer, Men's Basketball, Men's Cross Country, Men's Indoor Track & Field, Men's Golf (effective 2014–15), Men's Tennis, Men's Outdoor Track & Field, Women's Volleyball, Women's Basketball, Women's Cross Country, Women's Indoor Track & Field, Women's Golf, Women's Tennis, Women's Outdoor Track & Field, Women's Soccer, Softball
- Western Athletic Conference: Baseball, Women's Gymnastics
- American Athletic Conference: Rowing (effective 2014–15)
- Northern California Sand Volleyball Consortium: Women's Beach Volleyball

Scholarships are offered in all sports. The football and track and field teams compete in Hornet Stadium, baseball at John Smith Field, and the volleyball, men's and women's basketball and gymnastics teams call Colberg Court home, in honor of legendary volleyball coach Debby Colberg. The baseball stadium was renamed John Smith Field in 2011 in honor of the long-time head coach. Most athletic teams compete in the Big Sky Conference. Sacramento State is the only school from California in the Big Sky, which also includes Eastern Washington, Portland State, Idaho State, Northern Colorado, Northern Arizona and Weber State. UC Davis and Cal Poly joined the Big Sky for football only in 2012.

In 2013, the women's rowing team was granted access into an NCAA-affiliated conference, Conference USA (C-USA). Previously the team competed in Western Intercollegiate Rowing Association (WIRA) which is not recognized as a conference by the NCAA. Effective for the 2013–14 season, along with San Diego State University, the rowing team transferred into C-USA, with 12 rowing members, increasing competition, and providing eligibility for NCAA Championships nationally. However, the team only competed for one season in C-USA; it will move along with San Diego State to the American Athletic Conference beginning in 2014–15.

In 2003 and from 2005 to 2007, the university hosted the NCAA Track and Field Championship at Hornet Stadium.

In 2026, the university made the jump to the FBS, joining the Mid-American Conference in football, while other sports joined the Big West Conference.

== Auxiliary organizations ==
The California Education Code §89901 identifies auxiliary organizations of the California State University. Sacramento State currently has several auxiliary organizations:

=== Air Force Reserve Officer Training Corps ===
The school hosts Air Force Reserve Officer Training Corps, Detachment 088, which trains US Air Force cadets from Sacramento State and University of California Davis. It is currently the largest Detachment in Northern California.

=== Army Reserve Officer Training Corps ===
Old United States Army ROTC CSU, Sacramento Shoulder sleeve insignia

An independent Army ROTC program existed until the 1996 when the program was phased out by California State University, Sacramento President Donald Gerth due to the Army's policy of "Don't ask, don't tell". The program was allowed back onto campus in 1997, due to the possibility of the campus losing federal student aid and research funding. In 2002, the program received the gold MacArthur ROTC Leadership Award. The program currently exists as an extension of the Forged Gold Battalion based at University of California, Davis.

=== Associated Students Inc. ===
Associated Students Inc. is a nonprofit corporation that provides programs, services, and student government for Sacramento State, in accordance with the California Education Code. ASI is a California recognized 501(c)(3) corporation. Students elect the Board of Directors, which consists of the President, Executive Vice President, Vice President of Finance, Vice President of University Affairs, Vice President of Academic Affairs, a representative from each of the academic colleges, a representative for undeclared students, and a representative for graduate students. ASI has a budget of over $10 million, which is collected through semesterly student fees and revenues generated through its programs: Peak Adventures, Aquatic Center, Children's Center, and ASI student shop.

=== ASI Children's Center ===
Like most other CSUs, ASI offers a day care center for faculty, staff, or student's children ages newborn to five years. The ASI Children's Center is accredited by the NAEYC, something that only about 7% of children's centers are endorsed by. Child Development and Teacher Education majors are given the opportunity to work with the Children's Center.

=== Capital Public Radio, Inc. ===
Sacramento State owns and operates multiple public radio stations throughout California in close cooperation with Capital Public Radio.

Two of these stations are KXPR and KXJZ, both on FM. KXPR plays classical and jazz music. KXJZ offers local news and talk programming, including several popular shows like "This American Life", "A Prairie Home Companion", "Car Talk" and others. The listener-supported stations broadcast without commercials and with the support of underwriters. Both stations carry programming from National Public Radio.

=== KSSU 1580 AM ===
KSSU 1580AM is a non-profit free format radio station at Sacramento State and part of Associated Students. The radio station has only a 3-watt signal and is not strong enough to broadcast much farther than the campus, but it can be heard all over the world at kssu.com. KSSU is maintained and funded by the Associated Students Inc. KSSU has formed itself into being one of the premier college radio stations in North America. In 2007 the station won music director of the year from the College Music Journal and then returned to New York for the award show in 2008 with 8 nominations for awards by CMJ. In 2008, KSSU was also nominated for College Radio Station of the Year by MTVU. Notable former DJs include actor and international hip hop artist, Only Won who gave credit to KSSU at the 2010 Distinguished Service award for influencing his career in the music industry.

=== State Hornet ===
The State Hornet serves as Sacramento State's student newspaper. The State Hornet publishes 14 or 15 issues each semester and produces content for a daily Web site. The online edition carries the content of the print edition, posted Wednesday mornings, and publishes unique content to the site as generated by the staff. The 1999–2000 staff of the newspaper, led by Editor-in-Chief David Sommers and Faculty Advisor Sylvia Fox, was awarded the National Newspaper Pacemaker Award, considered to be the highest national honor in collegiate journalism and unofficially known as the "Pulitzer Prizes of student journalism." In 2012, the newspaper was placed in the Associated Collegiate Press Pacemaker Finalists category. The newspaper is formally administered by the Department of Communication Studies in the College of Arts and Letters.

=== University Union ===
The CSUS student activity center is the University Union. The University Union is unique in that it is the original building that was first structured in 1972. It has gone under major renovations throughout the years, with the first phase in 1992 that added a large ballroom and space for food vendors and meeting rooms and other extensions. In 1998, the Union underwent another major renovation again, adding another 180,000 square feet for certain University Outlets such as KSSU and Peak Adventures (which have both since moved). In 2012, the Union yet again underwent major renovations, including adding the university operated restaurant Good Eats, new flooring and stage demolition in the Redwood Room, a complete remodel of Round Table Pizza, an addition of the much requested "prayer room" or "quiet room" on the second floor, a complete remodel of the Terminal Lounge on the second floor, and tearing down the University Center Restaurant and building the new Epicure Restaurant.

Much is offered, including a large fast food court, a game room, public computers with internet access, free WiFi, conference rooms, the university's main auditoria, a prayer room, and many offices for student organizations including the Pride Center, the State Hornet (student paper), and others.

Sac State officials have announced an expansion of The University Union will begin in the first quarter of 2017. This expansion will add 71,000 square feet of space consisting of "a storefront for Peak Adventures (currently located at The WELL), a premium Starbucks venue, meeting and conference spaces for student groups and other organizations, additional restrooms, a study lounge, food-service storage, expanded casual seating, and an outdoor seating/pavilion area" according to the school website. Due to lack of space and overcrowding over the years, students have requested expanding the University Union. This expansion was funded with student fees, the Union WELL Inc., and generated fees; it completed in August 2018.

== Student clubs and organizations ==
Sacramento State has a wide selection of social and academic clubs and organizations. Each are dedicated to help students of similar interests bond together by common goals and aspirations. They make up a wide range of opportunities to be involved. They often represent national, international, local and regional organizations. Some also promote certain cultures or multiculturalism as well as political and recreational. Clubs and organizations are overseen by Student Organizations & Leadership. In fall 2012, approximately 7% of undergraduate men (or 774 students) were part of fraternities while 5% of undergraduate women (or 725 students) were part of sororities for a total of about 1,500 Greeks (the largest class to date).

In 2014, the CSU removed recognition from certain religious organizations that had policy conflicts with a state-mandated nondiscrimination policy. The new policy stated that religious clubs must allow any student eligibility to participate as a student leader regardless of beliefs. Both CRU and Intervarsity, as of fall 2015, came to an agreement with the Chancellor that allowed them to return to campus, while allowing them to maintain their religious beliefs.

== Transportation ==
University Transportation and Parking Services (UTAPS), an auxiliary of Sacramento State, operates its own buses known as the Hornet Shuttle, providing several lines around the campus running approximately 7:30 am until 5:00 pm in conjunction with Sacramento Regional Transit District. The Hornet Line serves the south end of the university, university/65th Light-Rail Station, and newly added Folsom Hall, the Green Line serves the College Town/La Riviera District and the east end of Campus, while the Gold Line runs all the way to the Fair Oaks district and the Arden Fair Mall. UTAPS also runs night shuttle for students, providing point-to-point service from dusk to 11:00 pm.

The university has a bus terminal station at the north end of campus, which serves as a major stop for Sacramento Regional Transit. RT provides bus services to downtown (Route 30), Midtown/Sutter District (Route 34), American River College/Watt (Route 82), Marconi/Arcade Light-Rail Station (Route 87), seven days a week departing approximately every 10 minutes. The university is located about 1/2-mile from University/65th Street station on the SacRT light rail system, just south of the campus.

Sacramento State students can use these resources, including LRT, for free with their student One Card.

The university also has multiple Zipcars housed on campus for students, faculty and staff to use 24-hours a day, part of the ZipCarU program.

Plans have been in the works for the university to operate its own streetcar bus rapid transit (BRT) system, looping around the perimeter of the campus and back to University/65th Street station. However this has been set back due to budget constraints. The Sacramento light rail system was originally proposed to run through the library quad, but then-president Donald Gerth vetoed the proposal over concerns for student safety.

The school is situated just north of US 50 and is accessible by two exits – 65th St. and Howe Avenue.

== Notable people ==
The university has conferred over 250,000 degrees since its establishment. CSUS alumni live over all 50 states of the U.S., with over 165,000 residing in California, nearly 3,000 in Washington, 2,500 in Oregon and over 2,000 in Texas. There are also over nearly 1,000 alumni residing in approximately 62 countries, including 102 located in Japan, 90 in India, and nearly 60 in Canada and China.

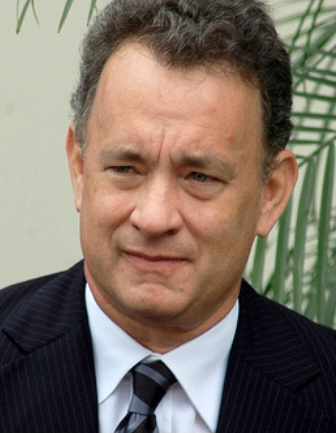
Tom Hanks, Academy Award Winning Actor

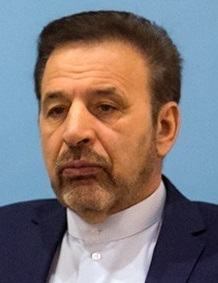
Mahmoud Vaezi, Chief of staff of the president of Iran

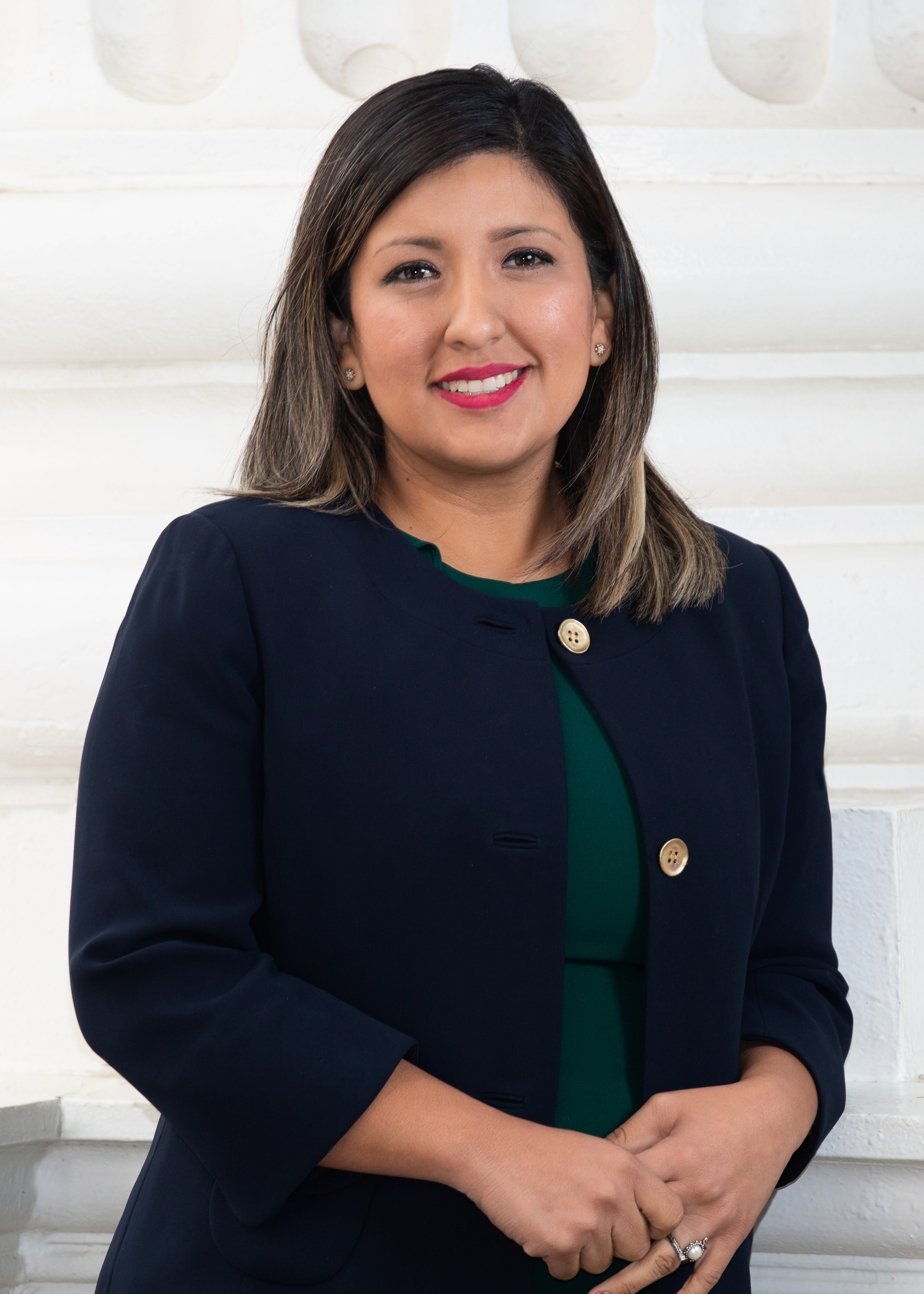
Melissa Hurtado, California State Senator

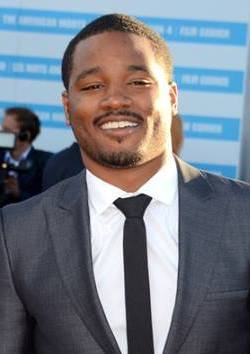
Ryan Coogler, Academy Award Nominated Director

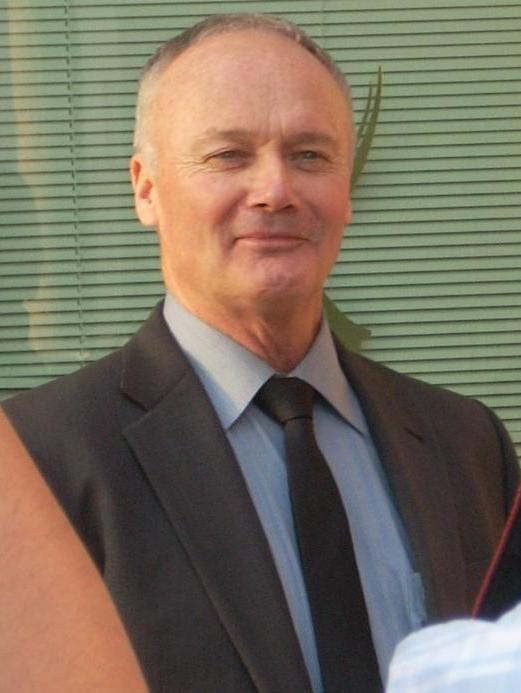
Creed Bratton, American actor and musician

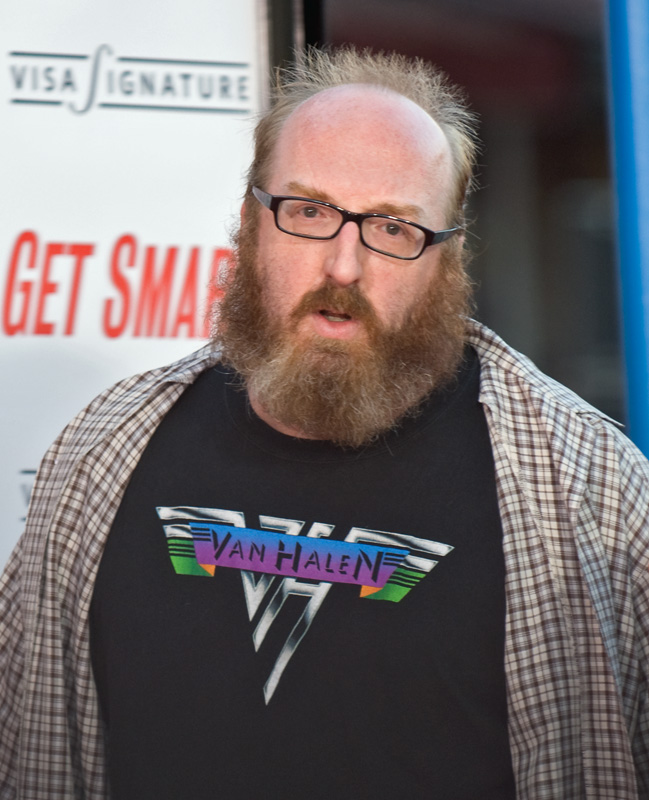
Brian Posehn, Comedian

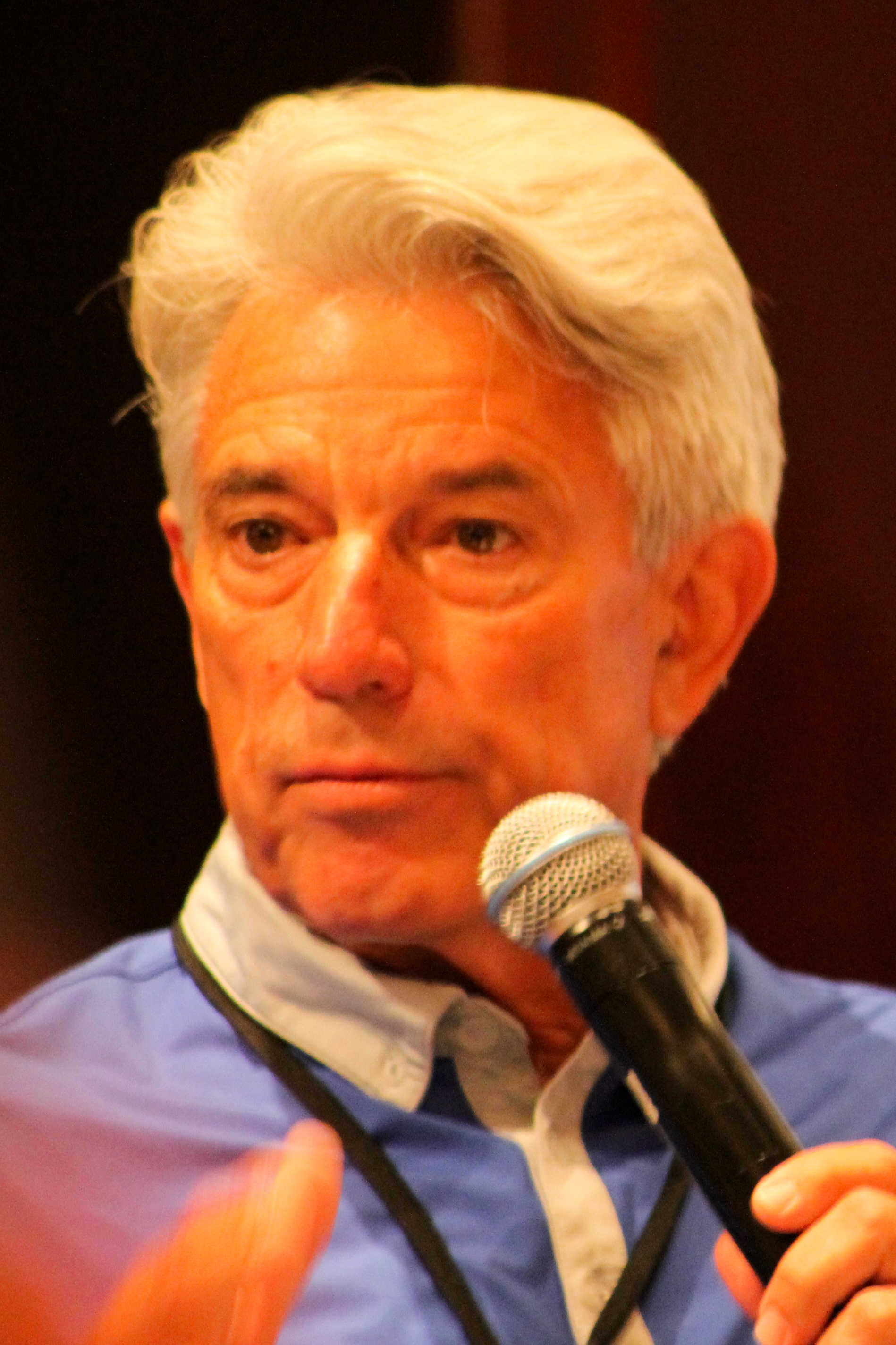
Buck Martinez, Toronto Blue Jays manager

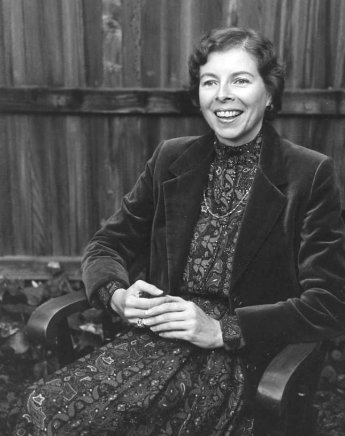
Ann Bannon, author best known for lesbian pulp fiction novels

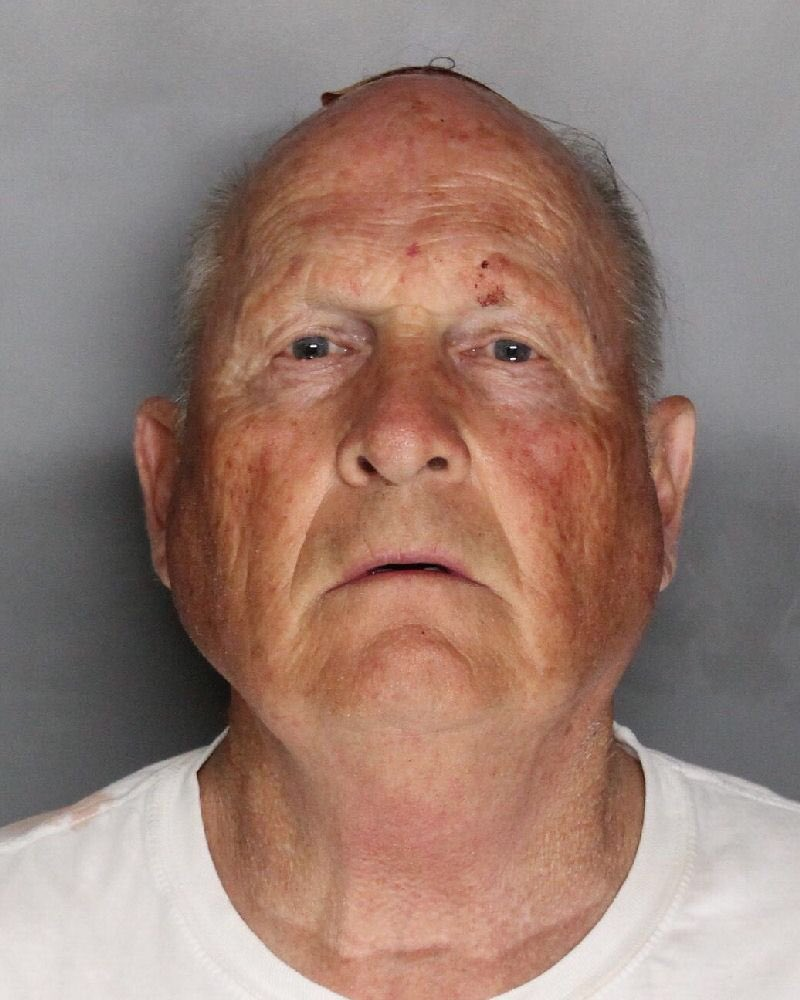
Joseph DeAngelo, the Golden State Killer
1. [Poison Ivy], [Lux Interior] of [The Cramps]

=== University presidents ===
1. Guy A. West (1947–1965)
2. F. Blair Mayne (1965)
3. Stephen L. Walker (1965–1966)
4. Robert Johns (1966–1969)
5. Otto Butz (1969–1970)
6. Bernard L. Hyink (1970–1972)
7. James G. Bond (1972–1978)
8. W. Lloyd Johns (1978–1983)
9. Austin J. Gerber (1983–1984)
10. Donald R. Gerth (1984–2003)
11. Alexander Gonzalez (2003–2015)
12. Robert S. Nelsen (2015–2023)
13. J. Luke Wood (2023–)

== See also ==
- Causeway Classic
