= Community College Leadership and Administration =

- Author: J. Luke Wood and Carlos Nevarez
- Language: English
- Subject: College and university administration
- Publisher: Peter Lang
- Publication date: April 30, 2010
- Media type: Print (hardcover / paperback)
- Pages: 290
- ISBN: 1-433-10795-3

Community College Leadership and Administration Theory, Practice, and Change (2010) is a College and University Administration textbook by J. Luke Wood and Carlos Nevarez, and published by Peter Lang.

== Contents ==
Community College Leadership and Administration Theory, Practice, and Change is divided into 12 chapters, as follows:

1. The Community College Vision and Mission
2. Historical Legacy of Community Colleges
3. Leadership and Leadership Theory
4. Achievement Gap and the Role of Community Colleges
5. Ethical Leadership and Decision Making
6. Faculty in the Community College
7. Demographic Trends
8. Leadership in Student Affairs
9. Community College Finance
10. Community College Governance
11. Leadership Development in the Community College
12. Emerging Trends

with a case study after each chapter.

== Reception ==
The Community College Leadership and Administration textbook is a #7 bestseller on Barnes and Nobles in the category of College and University Administration, and has been ranked #6 in Economic Theory on Amazon as of 2014.
