= J. Luke Wood =

American social scientist (born 1982)

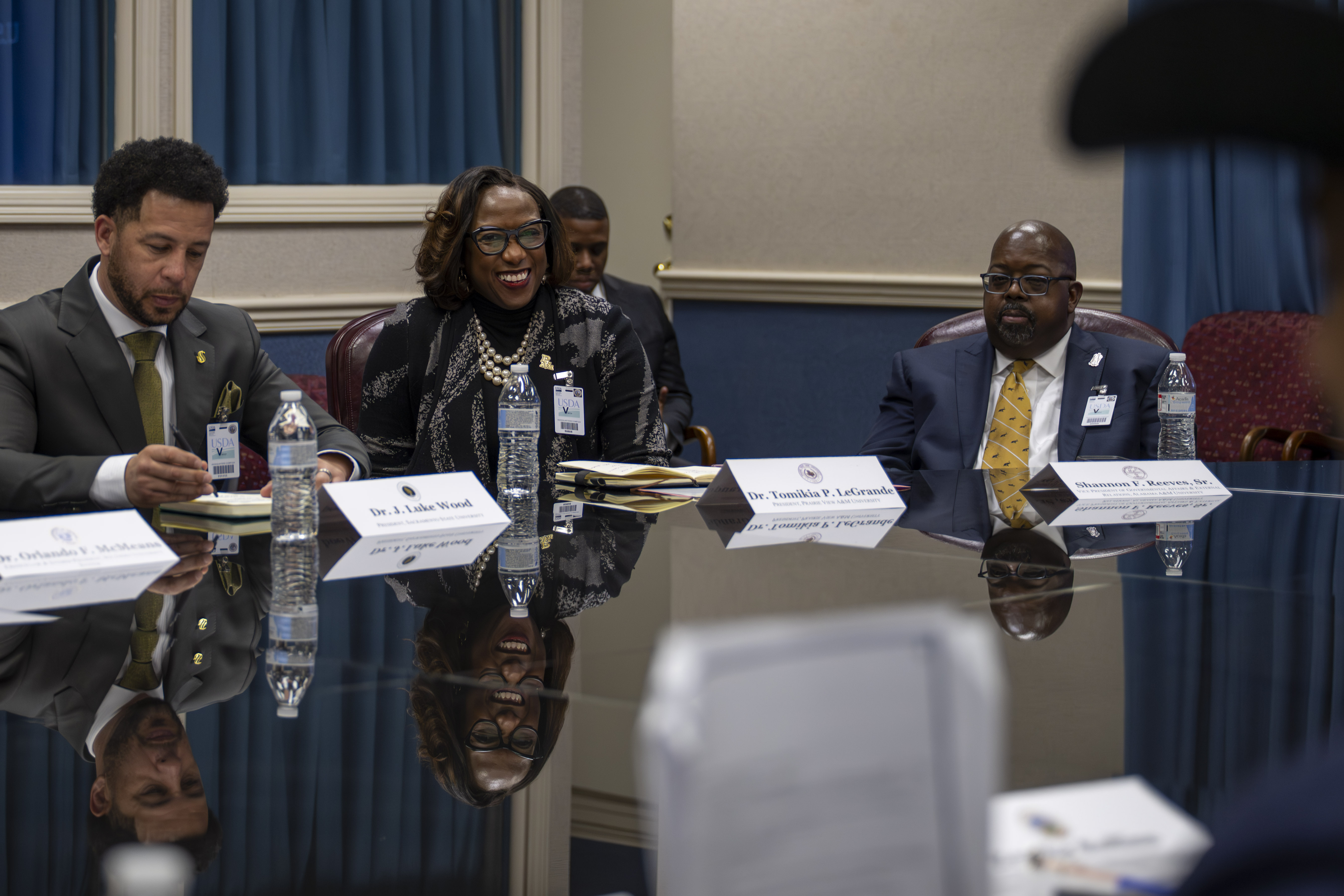
- Wood (left)

9th President of California State University, Sacramento
- Incumbent
- Assumed office May 2023
- Preceded by: Robert S. Nelsen

Personal details
- Born: Jonathan Luke Wood; February 21, 1982 (age 44) Oakland, California, U.S.
- Education: California State University, Sacramento (BA, MA); Arizona State University (PhD)

Academic background
- Thesis: African American males in the community college: Towards a model of academic success (2010)
- Doctoral advisor: Caroline Turner

Jonathan Luke Wood (born February 21, 1982), known professionally as J. Luke Wood, is an American social scientist and academic administrator who has served as the ninth president of Sacramento State since 2023. Before becoming president, Wood served as vice president for Student Affairs and Campus Diversity and chief diversity officer at San Diego State University.

== Career ==
Wood joined San Diego State University in 2011 as a professor in the Department of Administration, Rehabilitation and Postsecondary Education. In 2012, he became co-director, with Frank Harris III, of the Community College Equity Assessment Lab, a research and practice center focused on equity gaps affecting students of color.

In 2017, Wood became the first Black faculty member to be named a Distinguished Professor at San Diego State. He served as San Diego State's chief diversity officer from 2018 and was named vice president for Student Affairs and Campus Diversity in 2020.

Along with Frank Harris III, Wood is credited with coining the term "racelighting", which they define as racialized gaslighting.

Wood served as the lead co-sponsor, through the Black Minds Matter Coalition, of California Assembly Bill 740, a 2022 law concerning school suspension and expulsion procedures for foster youth.

== Black Minds Matter ==
In 2017, Wood taught a nationally broadcast course titled Black Minds Matter: A Focus on Black Boys and Men in Education. The course focused on educational issues affecting Black boys and men and included guest speakers such as Shaun R. Harper, Ilyasah Shabazz, Patrisse Cullors, Jerlando F. L. Jackson, S. Lee Merritt, and Frank Harris III.

== Sacramento State presidency ==
Wood became president of California State University, Sacramento in 2023. In 2024, he announced the Sacramento State Black Honors College, which the university described as his vision and the first program of its kind in the United States.

In 2024, Wood proposed student fee increases as part of what he called an "urgent financial situation". KCRA reported that the proposal included a $500-per-semester fee for in-state students and double that amount for out-of-state and international students for three years, and that some students said they could barely afford college after a separate California State University tuition increase. In September 2024, The State Hornet reported that Wood approved four of five proposed mandatory student fee increases after meeting with the Student Fee Advisory Committee. The approved increases applied to intercollegiate athletics, instructionally related activities, recreational sports, and student health services; a proposed $500-per-semester nonresident fee for out-of-state and international students was rejected after the committee cited a lack of student support. The State Hornet reported that the approved fee increases were expected to total $508 per student over three years and take effect in fall 2025.

Sacramento State also faced a budget deficit and announced reductions across campus operations. In April 2025, Wood announced a financial plan addressing layoffs, possible student fees, and other revenue sources. The State Hornet reported that Wood confirmed the university faced a $37 million deficit for the 2025-2026 fiscal year and that most divisions would receive approximately 22 percent budget cuts, with Academic Affairs taking a smaller reduction over two years. The plan included the elimination or merger of 28 management positions, with 15 employees terminated, and Wood said additional positions could be merged or cut. The same report said Wood had discussed a proposed Student Success Fee across colleges, which would be voted on by students and would fund services such as retention programs and additional class sections.

Wood's administration pursued moving Sacramento State football from the Football Championship Subdivision to the Football Bowl Subdivision through the Mid-American Conference. The proposal drew scrutiny over its financial terms, including an $18 million conference entry fee, a $5 million NCAA transition fee, travel obligations for visiting conference opponents, and the absence of conference revenue during the five-year agreement. CBS Sports reported that Collegiate Consulting CEO Russell Wright said Sacramento State's publicized $975 million athletic economic impact figure was a mischaracterization of the study his firm provided, and that he questioned the source of the university's $675 million national broadcast valuation claim. SFGate reported that Wood had publicly promoted the move and shared the university's economic-impact figures on social media.

In 2025, Wood announced a two-year on-campus housing requirement for incoming first-year students beginning in fall 2026. The policy requires incoming first-year, non-transfer students to live in university housing for their first two academic years, with local-residency exemptions for students living with immediate family within 50 miles of campus in the 2026-2027 academic year and 30 miles beginning in 2027-2028. CapRadio reported that Wood said the policy was intended to address students' basic needs and improve academic success by giving students greater access to housing, advising, tutoring, and campus resources. The requirement prompted student criticism and protests over affordability, housing availability, and commuting options.

== Personal life ==
Wood was born in Oakland, California, and raised in McCloud, California, a small town in Siskiyou County. A former foster child and transracial adoptee, he and his identical twin brother Josh were adopted as infants by a white Bay Area couple and later moved to McCloud. Sacramento State said Wood grew up in a large foster home that served more than 350 children.

While attending Sacramento State, Wood and Josh played in an alternative rock and funk band called Freestate and were involved in student government, with Josh serving as student body president and Luke serving as vice president. In 2026, The Sacramento Bee described Josh as a Rancho Cordova developer.

Wood met his future wife, San Diego State University professor Idara Essien-Wood, while both were students at Sacramento State. They have three children. Wood is a member of Alpha Phi Alpha fraternity and an amateur boxer.

== Publications ==
According to his Sacramento State biography, Wood has authored or edited 16 books and published more than 200 scholarly works. His books include:

- Black Minds Matter: Realizing the Brilliance, Dignity, and Morality of Black Males in Education
- Teaching boys and young men of color: A guidebook
- Teaching men of color in the community college: A guidebook
- Advancing Black male student success from preschool through PhD
- Black men in higher education: A guide to ensuring success
- Ethical leadership and the community colleges: Paradigms, decision-making, and praxis
- Black male collegians: Increasing access, retention, and persistence in higher education
- STEM models of success: Programs, policies, and practices in the community college
- Leadership theory and the community college: Applying theory to practice
- Community colleges and STEM: Examining underrepresented racial and ethnic minorities
- Black men in college: Implications for HBCU's and beyond
- Black males in post-secondary education: Examining their experiences in diverse institutional contexts
- Community College Leadership and Administration: Theory, Practice and Change
