= Robert S. Nelsen =

Robert Steven Nelsen

8th President of California State University, Sacramento
- In office July 1, 2015 – July 16, 2023
- Preceded by: Alexander Gonzalez
- Succeeded by: J. Luke Wood

8th President of the University of Texas–Pan American
- In office January 2010 – August 2014

Personal details
- Born: January 21, 1952 (age 74) Brigham City, Utah, U.S.
- Spouse: Joellyn Hawkins
- Parent(s): Robert Secrist Nelsen (father), Geraldine (Jensen) Nelsen (mother)
- Education: Brigham Young University (BA, MA); University of Chicago (PhD)

Robert Steven Nelsen (born January 21, 1952) is an American academic administrator, who served as the eighth President of California State University, Sacramento from July 1, 2015 to July 16, 2023.

On November 2, 2022, Nelsen announced his impending retirement as President of California State University, Sacramento and the CSU Board of Trustees subsequently announced their search for the ninth President of the University by the Trustees Committee for the Selection of the President chaired by Diego Arambula.

== Early life and education ==
Nelsen was born in Brigham City, Utah, and raised in Madison County, Montana. He earned a bachelor 1978 and master's degree in political science 1979 from Brigham Young University and a Ph.D. from the University of Chicago 1989, specializing in modern literature, modern philosophy, and modern political theory.

== Career ==
Prior to becoming president of CSUS, he was serving as special adviser to the University of Texas System's Executive Vice Chancellor for Academic Affairs. Nelsen served as the eighth President of the University of Texas–Pan American from January 2010 to August 2014.

Prior to this, Nelsen was an associate vice president for academic affairs and professor of English at Texas A&M University–Corpus Christi.

Earlier, Nelsen was a faculty member at the University of Texas at Dallas. He served as the speaker of the Faculty and chaired the University of Texas System Faculty Advisory Council. After winning the Chancellor’s Council Award for Outstanding Teaching, he was recruited into the Provost's Office and served as vice provost there.

Nelsen is an author of fiction in journals which include the Story Quarterly, Other Voices, Chariton Review, and Southwest Review.

== Honors and awards ==
- Pushcart Prize, Best of the Small Presses: Distinguished Stories Award, 1991: "Ronnie Big Wolf Tooth" and "Two Points of a Blue Star", 1991
- "Ten Best Journals," Common Knowledge, May 1, 1993, Library Journal
- "Best Journal in Humanities, Social Studies, and Social Sciences, 1993," Common Knowledge, The Association of American Publishers, January 1994
- Literacy Champion Award, South Texas Literacy Coalition, Historias de la Vida 3rd Annual Gala, Palmhurst, Texas, September 24, 2011
- Community Literacy Champion, South Texas Literacy Coalition, Edinburg, Texas, September 22, 2012
- Edinburg Rotary Leadership Award, Edinburg, Texas, June 26, 2013
- Good Samaritan Community Services Award, Good Samaritan Community Services, Pharr, Texas, August 7, 2013
- Man of the Year Award, Edinburg Chamber of Commerce, Edinburg, Texas, Texas, October 24, 2013
- Golden Eagle Award, Rio Grande Valley Hispanic Chamber of Commerce, McAllen, Texas, March 1, 2014
- Rio Grande Valley Walk of Fame, BorderFest, Hidalgo, Texas, March 5, 2014
- Champion of the Year, Sacramento Black Chamber of Commerce 2022
