= California Senate Fellows =

The California Senate Fellows program was established in 1973 to provide participants with insight into the legislative process. The program's primary goals include exposing people with diverse life experiences and backgrounds to the legislative process and providing research and other professional staff assistance to the Senate. The program is jointly sponsored by the California State Senate and the Center for California Studies at California State University, Sacramento (CSUS).

== Fellowship year ==
Eighteen California Senate Fellows are selected to serve as full-time Senate staff for 11 months beginning each October. Fellows are assigned to either senators' or committee offices in early December and work as part of the public policy staff in the Capitol. Responsibilities include helping develop legislative proposals, researching and analyzing bills, responding to constituent inquiries, and writing press releases and speeches. Those selected for policy committees specialize and develop expertise with respect to the subject-matter of their committee. Additional committee responsibilities include research assignments and assisting the chairperson with committee-related legislation that they are moving through the legislature. All Fellows receive a monthly stipend of $2,794 plus full health, vision and dental benefits. Academically the Fellows attend mandatory seminars taught at the Capitol by faculty from the CSUS's Government Department, earning 12 units of graduate credit.

== Requirements ==
The only program prerequisites are being 20 years of age and having a degree from a four-year college or university when the program commences. There is no preferred major due to the interdisciplinary nature of the work. Individuals with advanced degrees and those in mid-career are encouraged to apply. Although no previous political or legislative experience is necessary, applicants should have a strong interest in public policy and politics. Selected applicants receive a five-week orientation provides background on state government, the legislative process, and major policy issues.

== Previous Senate Fellows ==
Notable Senate Fellows include:

- Xavier Becerra (1980–81), United States Secretary of Health and Human Services and former Attorney General of California
- Jordan Cunningham (2000–01), California State Assemblyman
- Dean Florez (1987–88), former California State Senate Majority Leader and former California State Assemblyman
- Matt Haney (2005–06), California State Assemblyman
- Kristin Olsen (1996–97), former California State Assembly Republican Leader
- Sebastian Ridley-Thomas (2009–10), former California State Assemblyman
- Todd Spitzer (1982–83), Orange County District Attorney and former California State Assemblyman
- Jose Solorio (1992–93), former California State Assemblyman
- Betty Yee (1988–89), California State Controller and former Chair of the California Board of Equalization
