= Jerlando F. L. Jackson =

American educator

Jerlando F. L. Jackson is an American academic, researcher, and higher education executive. He serves as Dean and MSU Research Foundation Professor of Education at the College of Education, Michigan State University, where he is also Director and Chief Research Scientist of the Organizational Disparities Laboratory (ODL).

== Early life and education ==
Jackson was born in Ashburn, Georgia, but grew up in Fort Benning, Georgia, the son of a drill sergeant. He earned a Bachelor of Music Education from the University of Southern Mississippi, a Master of Education from Auburn University, and a Ph.D. in Educational Leadership and Policy Studies from Iowa State University.

== Career ==
University of Wisconsin–Madison

In 2000, Jackson joined the University of Wisconsin–Madison, becoming the first African American faculty member in the Department of Educational Leadership and Policy Analysis. He earned tenure in 2007, was promoted to full professor in 2011, and later held the titles of Vilas Distinguished Professor (2012) and Rupple-Bascom Professor of Education (2021). He served as department chair from 2018 to 2022.

In 2010, Jackson founded Wisconsin’s Equity and Inclusion Laboratory (Wei LAB), an interdisciplinary research center focused on examining systemic inequities in higher education organizations. The LAB collaborated with universities, government agencies, and private foundations to develop evidence-based diversity, equity, and inclusion strategies.

Michigan State University

In 2022, Jackson was appointed Dean of the College of Education at Michigan State University. As Dean, he led the college through the development of a strategic plan and launched cross-college initiatives under the Advancing Education with Science priority. These initiatives include work in virtual education, intelligent classroom design, artificial intelligence in education, and extended reality learning environments (VAX-R).

He also established internal community engagement programs such as InformED and ExplorED, which facilitate collaboration and learning among faculty, staff, and university leadership.

== Research and contributions ==
Jackson is widely recognized for advancing the field of organizational disparities in higher education. His research examines how fairness and organizational justice impact career mobility, retention, and workplace experiences for underrepresented populations, particularly in STEM. He is credited with coining the term “organizational disparities.” He recently emboldened his research by intellectually identifying fairness as a pathway to confronting organizational disparities. He argues that “organizational fairness” as a central concept holds great promise to reframe systemic inequities within academic institutions, integrating organizational justice theory, intersectionality, and critical quantitative methods. Jackson has led over nine major National Science Foundation-funded research projects and contributed significantly to studies on Black representation in computing and STEM disciplines.

His methodological expertise includes mixed-methods research, institutional ethnography, integrative research reviews, and secondary data analysis. He has developed fairness assessment tools and inclusive leadership training modules used in higher education institutions nationwide.

== Publications ==
Jackson has authored or edited over 125 publications, including books, journal articles, and policy reports. His notable works include:

- Measuring Glass Ceiling Effects in Higher Education: Opportunities and Challenges
- Introduction to American Higher Education
- Advancing Equity And Diversity in Student Affairs

His work is published in leading journals and cited in both scholarly and policy-making contexts.

== Awards & Honors ==
- Fellow, American Educational Research Association (2024)
- Fellow, American Association for the Advancement of Science (2021)
- Member, Sigma Xi Scientific Research Honor Society
- Regularly ranked in the top 200 scholars in Education Week’s Edu-Scholar Public Influence Rankings

== Professional Activities ==
Jackson frequently delivers keynote addresses at academic and professional conferences and consults on issues related to fairness and organizational transformation in higher education. He serves on national advisory boards, editorial boards, and panels focused on increasing access, inclusion, and fairness in academia.

== Selected bibliography ==
Selected articles

- Jackson, J. F. L., Charleston, L. J., & Gilbert, J. E. (2014) The Use Regional Data Collection to Inform University Led Initiatives: The Case of a STEM Education SWOT Analysis. Journal of STEM Education, 15(1), 11–19.
- Jackson, J. F. L., Charleston, L. J., Gilbert, J. E., & Seals, C. (2013). Changing Attitudes About Computing Science at Historically Black Colleges and Universities: Benefits of an Intervention Program Designed for Undergraduates. Journal of African American Studies, 17, 162–173.
- Jackson, J. F. L., & O’Callaghan, E. M. (2011) Understanding Employment Disparities Using Glass Ceiling Effects Criteria: An Examination of Race/Ethnicity and Senior-Level Position Attainment Across the Academic Workforce. Journal of the Professoriate, 5(2), 67–99.
- Jackson, J. F. L., & O’Callaghan, E. M. (2009).What Do We Know About Glass Ceiling Effects? A Taxonomy and Critical Review to Inform Higher Education Research. Research in Higher Education, 50, 460–482.

Chapters in edited texts

- Jackson, J. F. L., O’Callaghan, E. M., & Adserias, R. P. (2014). Approximating Glass Ceiling Effects Using Cross-Sectional Data. In J. F. L. Jackson, E. M. O’Callaghan, & R. A. Leon (Eds.), (2014). Measuring Glass Ceiling Effects in Higher Education: Opportunities and Challenges. New Directions for Institutional Research (159) (pp. 37–47). Jossey-Bass Press.
- Jackson, J. F. L., Charleston, L. J., George, P. L., & Gilbert, J. E. (2012). Factors that Attract African American Males to Computer Science: A Study of Aspiring and Current Professionals. In M. C. Brown & T. E. Dancy (Eds.), African American Males and Education: Researching the Convergence of Race and Identity (pp. 189 – 201). Information Age.
- Jackson, J. F. L., Charleston, L. J., Lewis, C. W., Gilbert, J. E., & Middleton, L. P. (2012). Rising STEM Occupational Demands and Low American American Participants in Arizona's Scientific Workforce: Do Attitudes Toward STEM College Majors and Careers Matter? The State of Black Arizona: Volume III. Phoenix, AZ: Arizona State University.
- Jackson, J. F. L., & Charleston, L. J. (2012). Differential Gender Outcomes of Career Exploration Sessions for African American Undergraduates: An Examination of a Computing Science Outreach Effort at Predominantly White Institutions. In C. R. Chambers & R. V. Sharpe (Eds.), Black African Female Undergraduates on Campus: Success and Challenges (pp. 185–197). Emerald Group Publishing.

Books

- Jackson, J. F. L. (Ed.). (2007). Strengthening the Educational Pipeline for African Americans: Informing Research, Policy, and Practice. SUNY Press.
- Jackson, J. F. L., & Terrell, M. C. (Eds.) (2007). Creating and Maintaining Safe Campuses: A Sourcebook for Evaluating and Enhancing Safety Programs. Stylus Publishing.
- Jackson, J. F. L., & O’Callaghan, E. M. (2009). Ethnic and Racial Administrative Diversity: Understanding Work Life Realities and Experiences in Higher Education. Jossey-Bass Press.
- Harper, S. R., & Jackson, J. F. L. (Eds.). (2010). Introduction to American Higher Education. Routledge Press.
- Jackson, J. F. L., O’Callaghan, E. M., & Leon, R. A. (Eds.). (2014). Measuring Glass Ceiling Effects in Higher Education: Opportunities and Challenges. New Directions for Institutional Research (159), Jossey-Bass Press.
