= Synchronised swimming at the 1973 World Aquatics Championships =

These are the results from the synchronised swimming competition at the 1973 World Aquatics Championships, which took place in Belgrade.

== Medal table ==
Rank	Nation	Gold	Silver	Bronze	Total
1	United States (USA)	3	0	0	3
2	Canada (CAN)	0	3	0	3
3	Japan (JPN)	0	0	3	3
Totals (3 entries)		3	3	3	9

== Medal summary ==
Event	Gold	Silver	Bronze
Solo routine	Teresa Andersen (USA); 120.460	Jojo Carrier (CAN); 112.534	Junko Hasumi (JPN); 104.180
Duet routine	Teresa Andersen (USA); Gail Johnson (USA); 118.391	Jojo Carrier (CAN); Madeleine Ramsay (CAN); 112.917	Masako Fujiwara (JPN); Yasuko Fujiwara (JPN); 109.702
Team routine	United States (USA); Teresa Andersen; Susan Baross; Robin Curren; Jackie Douglas; Gail Johnson; Dana Moore; Amanda Norrish; Suzanne Randell; 117.617	Canada (CAN); Michelle Calkins; Frances Hambrook; Debbie Humphrey; Lorraine Nicholl; Gail Page; Carol Stuart; Susan Thomas; Laura Wilkin; 112.918	Japan (JPN); Masako Fujiwara; Yasuko Fujiwara; Junko Hasumi; Yasuko Unesaki — — — — 107.311
