= Goethe House (disambiguation) =

Goethe House may refer to:

- Goethe House, Frankfurt am Main, Germany
- Goethe House (Weimar), Germany
- Goethe House (Sacramento), California, United States
- Goethe-Haus, the original home of Goethe-Institut, New York, United States
- Casa di Goethe, Rome, Italy
