= University Arboretum at California State University, Sacramento =

Arboretum and botanic garden in Sacramento, California

Coordinates: 38.56539°N 121.4284°W

University Arboretum
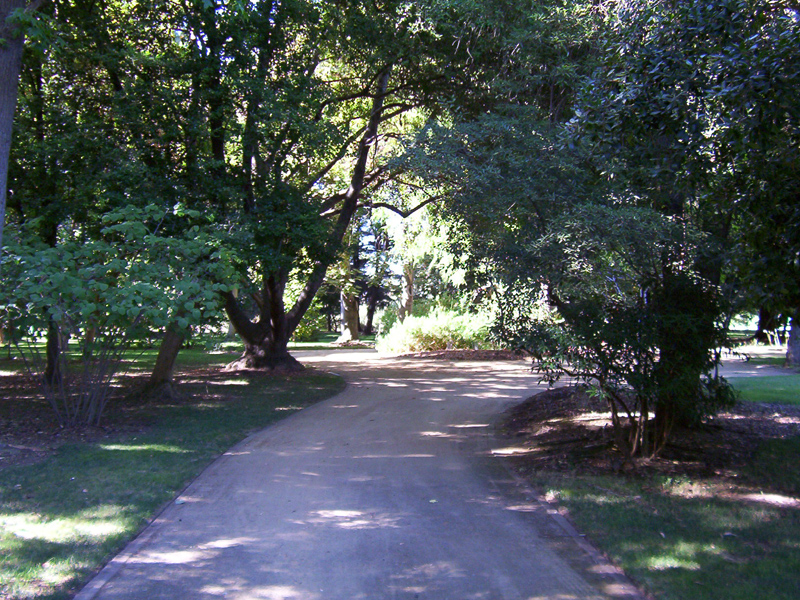
- Interactive map of University Arboretum
- Type: Arboretum; botanic garden
- Website: www.csus.edu/experience/visit/arboretum

The University Arboretum is the arboretum and botanic garden of the California State University, Sacramento at 6000 J Street, Sacramento, California.

Founded in 1945 on what used to be a pear orchard and hop ranch, the arboretum was originally named the Charles M. Goethe Arboretum in honor of Charles Goethe, a land developer, philanthropist, conservationist, eugenicist, and one of the university's founding fathers. "The name was changed without fanfare to University Arboretum in 2005" because of renewed attention to Goethe's virulently racist views, praise of Nazi Germany, and advocacy of eugenics.

Located on a 3-acre (12,000-sq m) site, the arboretum is open daily from dawn to dusk and has some 1200 trees. Of particular interest is a wide-ranging conifer collection as well as several rare plants, including Taiwania and the "living fossil" Wollemia. The arboretum has a "Jurassic Park" section with flowering plants species dating back to the age of dinosaurs and another section for California native plants, with some 50 different species represented.

Mike Baad, a retired professor who volunteered at the arboretum since he joined the university in 1969, is the University Arboretum's longtime director.

== See also ==
- List of botanical gardens in the United States
- Goethe House (Sacramento)
