= Julia Morgan =

American architect and engineer (1872–1957)

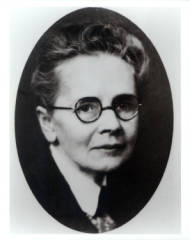
- Morgan in 1926
- Born: Julia Morgan; January 20, 1872; San Francisco, California, U.S.
- Died: February 2, 1957 (aged 85); San Francisco, California, U.S.
- Education: University of California, Berkeley
- Occupation: Architect
- Awards: AIA Gold Medal
- Buildings: Los Angeles Examiner Building; The YWCA in Chinatown, San Francisco; Riverside Art Museum; Asilomar Conference Grounds
- Projects: Hearst Castle

Julia Morgan (January 20, 1872 – February 2, 1957) was an American architect and engineer. She designed more than 700 buildings in California during a long and prolific career. She is best known for her work on Hearst Castle in San Simeon, California.

Morgan was the first woman to be admitted to the architecture program at l'École nationale supérieure des Beaux-Arts in Paris and the first female architect licensed in California. She designed many edifices for institutions serving women and girls, including a number of buildings for the Young Women's Christian Association (YWCA) and Mills College.

In many of her structures, Morgan pioneered the aesthetic use of reinforced concrete, a material that proved to have superior seismic performance in the 1906 and 1989 earthquakes. She embraced the Arts and Crafts Movement and used various producers of California pottery to adorn her buildings. She sought to reconcile classical and Craftsman, scholarship and innovation, formalism and whimsy.

Julia Morgan was the first woman to receive the American Institute of Architects' highest award, the AIA Gold Medal, posthumously in 2014.

== Early life and education ==
=== Childhood ===
Morgan, the daughter of Charles Bill Morgan and Eliza Woodland Parmelee Morgan, was born in San Francisco on January 20, 1872, the second of five children. Her mother, Eliza, grew up as the indulged daughter of Albert O. Parmelee, a cotton trader and millionaire who financially supported the couple when they moved to San Francisco. Two years after their daughter's birth, the Morgans moved across San Francisco Bay to a home they had built in Oakland. Though the Morgans resided on the West Coast, Eliza still kept close ties with her family. Upon the birth of each Morgan child, the Parmelees sent funds for the family to travel by the transcontinental railroad so that the infant could be christened in the traditional Parmelee family church in New York.

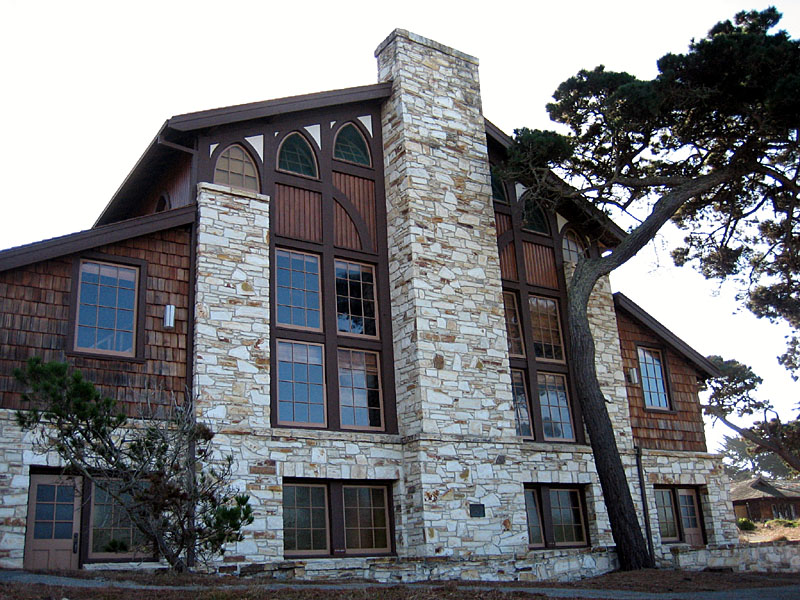
Merrill Hall (1928) on the grounds of Asilomar Conference Grounds in Pacific Grove, California

A mining engineer from New England, Charles Morgan did not succeed in any of his business ventures, so the family relied heavily on the Parmelee fortune. In 1865, Charles had his first venture in California when he bought land in Santa Paula to unsuccessfully drill for oil. He later cofounded the Shasta Iron Company, which was dissolved in 1875 after limited income. In mid-1878, Eliza took the children to New York to live near the Parmelees for a year while Charles worked in San Francisco. In New York, Julia met her older cousin Lucy Thornton, who was married to successful architect Pierre LeBrun. After returning to Oakland, Julia kept in contact with LeBrun; he encouraged her to pursue a higher education. In New York, Julia had been ill with scarlet fever and was kept in bed for a few weeks. As a result of this illness, she was prone to ear infections throughout her adult life. Upon the death of Albert Parmelee in July 1880, Julia's grandmother moved into the Morgans' Oakland house, bringing with her the Parmelee wealth. Both Julia's mother and grandmother provided strong female role models, who because of their wealth had a strong degree of power in the Morgan household.

=== Education ===
Morgan graduated from Oakland High School in 1890. She was dedicated to her education and a professional career in architecture. She enrolled in the University of California, Berkeley, where she studied engineering, as there was no architectural program. At the university, she was a member of the Kappa Alpha Theta sorority and was often the only woman in her math, science, and engineering courses. She attended Berkeley during a time of growth for women's involvement which took place between 1889 and 1891, when women were founding clubs and gaining access to new spaces and extracurriculars. Morgan helped to create a chapter of the YWCA during her time as an undergraduate student, which made it possible for women to use the gymnasium. She graduated in 1894 as the first woman with a B.S. degree in civil engineering at Berkeley with honors. After her graduation, Morgan became a member of the Association of Collegiate Alumnae, now the American Association of University Women.

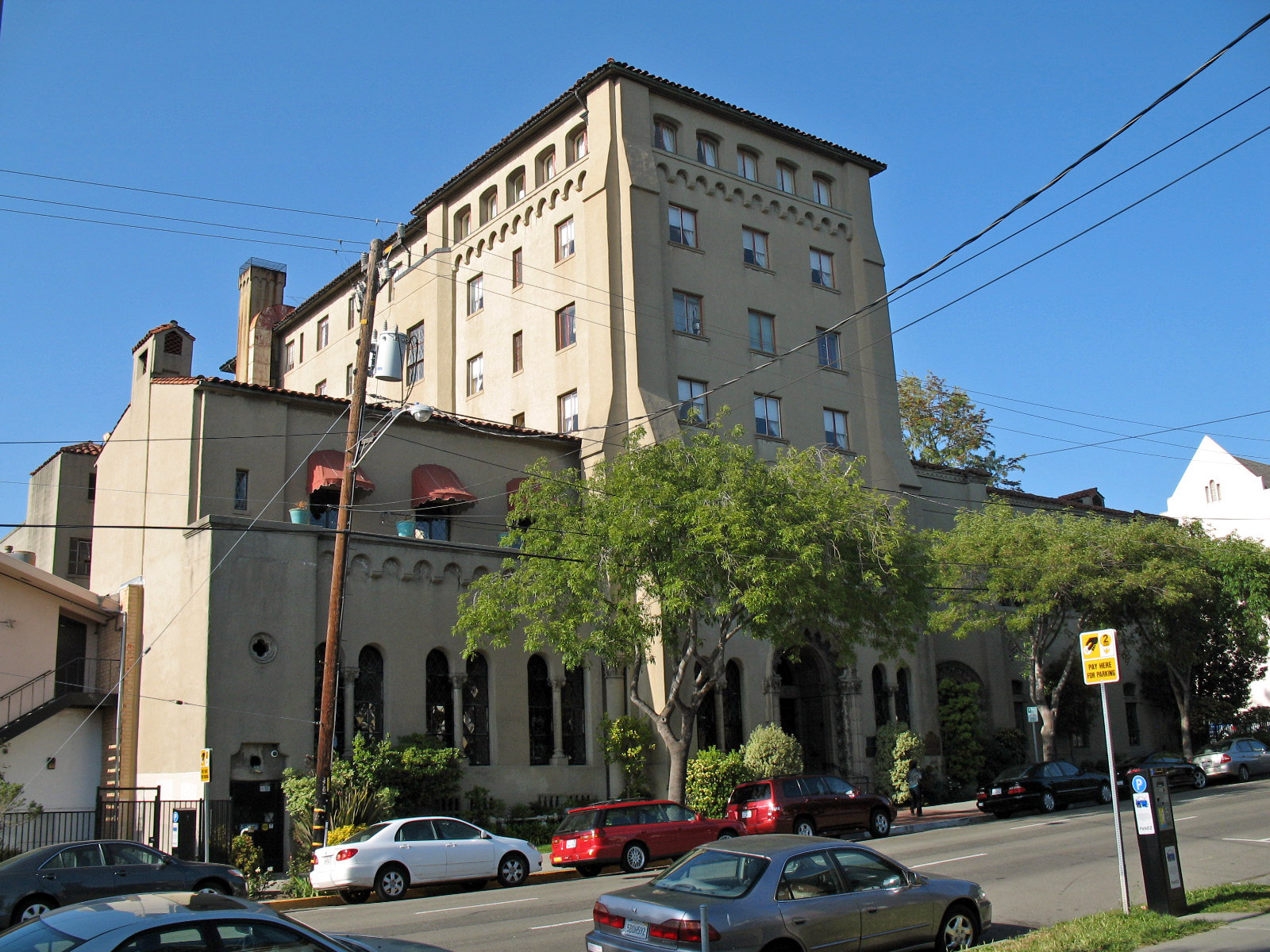
Berkeley Women's City Club, at 2315 Durant Avenue, Berkeley, California

One of the engineering lecturers of her senior year was Bernard Maybeck, an architect who designed buildings that Morgan admired for their respect for the surrounding topography and environment. Maybeck mentored Morgan, along with her classmates Arthur Brown, Jr., Edward H. Bennett and Lewis P. Hobart, in architecture at his Berkeley home. He encouraged Morgan to continue her studies at the prestigious École nationale supérieure des Beaux-Arts in Paris where he had distinguished himself. After graduating from Berkeley, Morgan gained a year of work experience building with Maybeck, then traveled to Paris in 1896 to prepare for the Beaux-Arts entrance exam. The school had never before allowed a woman to study architecture, but in 1897 it opened its entry process to female applicants, largely because of pressure from a union of French women artists, whom Morgan characterized as "bohemians." In her time at the Beaux-Arts, Morgan interacted with members of the Union des femmes peintres et sculpteurs, a group focused on advancing women in art. Morgan met with these women and was exposed to their feminist views; they discussed how to increase the influence of women in professional careers.

In principle, the school admitted the top 30 candidates. It took Morgan three tries to get in: on the first try, she placed too low, while on her second try, in 1898, although she placed well into the top 30, the examiners "arbitrarily lowered" her marks. After more than a year of further study, tutored by François-Benjamin Chaussemiche, a winner of the Prix de Rome, she finally passed the entrance exams in the Architecture Program, placing 13th out of 376 applicants, and was duly admitted. However, she could study only until her 30th birthday, as the school prohibited older scholars. In early 1902, as her birthday approached, Morgan submitted an outstanding design for a palatial theater. This earned her a certificate in architecture, making her the first woman to receive one from the school; she did so in three years, although the usual time of completion was five years (that was how long Maybeck took, for example). She stayed in Paris long enough to collaborate with Chaussemiche on a project for Harriet Fearing, an ex–New Yorker who contracted for a "grand salon" design for her residence in Fontainebleau.

== Career ==
Upon her return from Paris, Morgan began working for San Francisco architect John Galen Howard, who was supervising the University of California Master Plan. Morgan worked on several buildings on the Berkeley campus, providing the decorative elements for the Hearst Mining Building and an early proposal for Sather Gate. She was a major force in design and supervision of the Hearst Greek Theatre, UC Berkeley's amphitheater that overlooks San Francisco Bay from a distance. Howard told a colleague that Morgan was "an excellent draftsman whom I have to pay almost nothing, as it is a woman." She saved her money and made plans to work on her own, accepting important side projects.

In 1904, Morgan was the first woman to obtain an architecture license in California. While living at the old family home in Oakland, she opened her own office in San Francisco, where the staff knew her as 'J.M.' After her first office was destroyed by the 1906 fire, she opened a new office in 1907 on the 13th floor of the Merchants Exchange Building, at 465 California Street, in the heart of San Francisco's financial district, where she worked for the rest of her career, until her retirement in 1950. Also in 1907 she partnered with Ira Hoover, a former draftsman for Howard. As a firm named Morgan and Hoover, the two worked together until 1910. Morgan then re-established an individual private practice.

In April 1904, Morgan completed her first reinforced concrete structure, El Campanil, the 72-foot bell tower at Mills College, located in Oakland. Two years later, El Campanil survived the 1906 San Francisco earthquake unscathed, which helped build Morgan's reputation and launch her career. Throughout her career, Morgan was said to have completed approximately 800 buildings, most of which are located in California.

The devastation of the 1906 San Francisco earthquake and fire provided Morgan with the opportunity to design numerous homes, churches, offices, and educational facilities. An important project was the redesign of the landmark Fairmont Hotel in San Francisco after its interior was severely damaged by fire after the earthquake. She was chosen because of her then-rare knowledge of earthquake-resistant, reinforced concrete construction. Her work on restoring the Fairmont in less than a year brought her a national reputation as "a superb engineer, an innovative designer and architect, and a dedicated professional." The marked increase in commissions following the disaster of 1906 brought her financial success.

"My work here [Fairmont Hotel] has all been structural." —Julia Morgan (1907)

Greatly impressed by her work on the Fairmont, Phoebe Apperson Hearst recommended Morgan for several large construction projects, including the YMCA's Asilomar Conference Grounds in Pacific Grove, near Monterey. Her son, William Randolph Hearst, was likewise greatly impressed and, after his mother's death, retained Morgan to design what would become the biggest and most famous project of her career, Hearst Castle.

=== Hearst projects ===
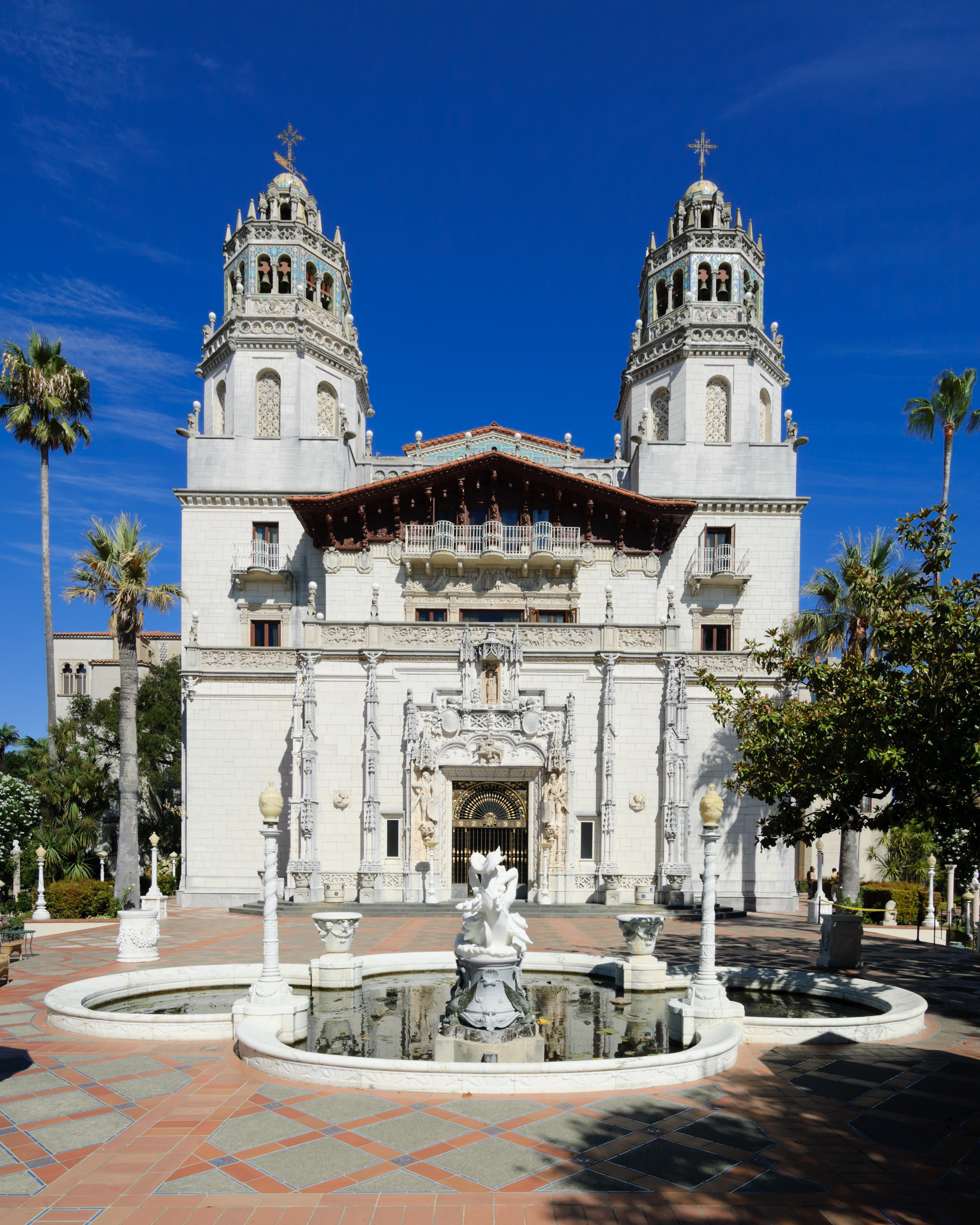
The Hearst Castle facade.

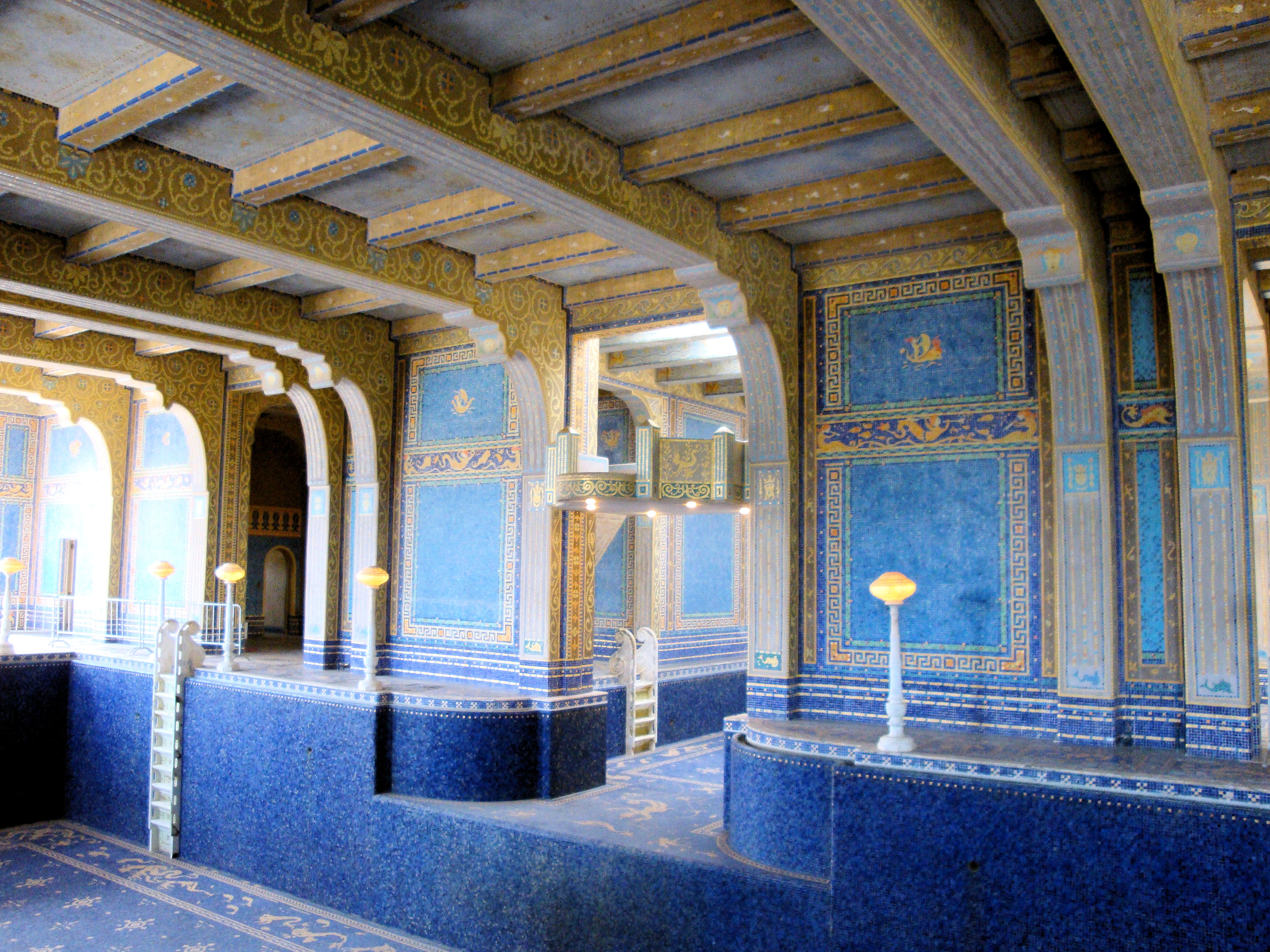
Indoor Roman pool on Hearst Castle grounds (empty)

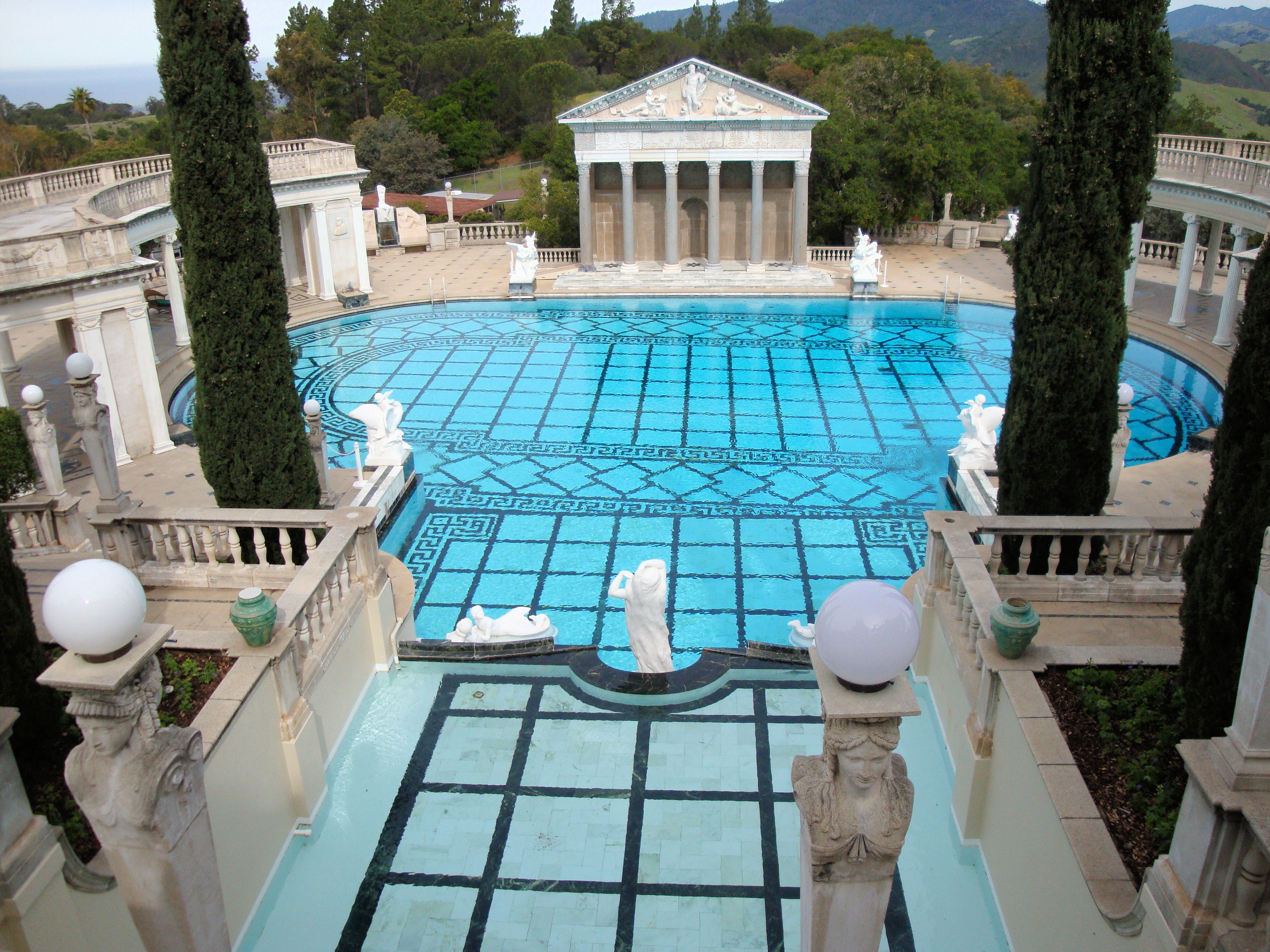
Hearst Castle outdoor Neptune pool view

Julia Morgan’s involvement with the Hearst family continued for three generations. Her first project was commissioned by the family in 1902, when she returned from the École: Phoebe Hearst's Hacienda at Pleasanton. Morgan's most famous patron was Phoebe Hearst's son, the newspaper magnate and antiquities collector William Randolph Hearst, who had been introduced to Morgan by his mother, the chief patron of Morgan's alma mater, the University of California at Berkeley. It is believed that this introduction led to Morgan's first downstate commission, by the younger Hearst, for the design of the Los Angeles Examiner Building (circa 1914), a Mission revival style project that included contributions by Los Angeles architects William J. Dodd and J. Martyn Haenkel. It is located at the southwest corner of Broadway and 11th Street on a city block in Downtown Los Angeles. After the Examiner closed in 1989, the building was listed on the National Register of Historic Places over the objections of the Hearst Corporation, which was exploring demolition. A 2016 rehabilitation project resulted in the building becoming a site for multiple commercial tenants, notably Arizona State University in 2021.

In 1919, Hearst selected Morgan as the architect for La Cuesta Encantada, better known as Hearst Castle, which was built atop the family campsite overlooking San Simeon, in San Luis Obispo County. Morgan employed tiles, designing many of them herself, from California Faience.

The Hearst Castle project proved to be Morgan's largest and most complex, as Hearst's vision for his estate grew ever grander over the decades of planning and construction. The project included The Hacienda, a residence–private guest house complex built in hybrid Mission Revival, Spanish Colonial Revival (working with Hispanic experts Mildred Stapley and Arthur Byne), and Moorish Revival styles. It was located a day's horseback ride inland from Hearst Castle, next to the Mission San Antonio de Padua near Jolon, California. Morgan's work on 'the Castle' and San Simeon Ranch continued until 1947, ended only by Hearst's declining health.

Morgan became William Randolph Hearst's principal architect, producing the designs for dozens of buildings, such as Phoebe Apperson Hearst's Wyntoon, which her son inherited. The estate includes a castle and "Bavarian village" of four villas, all on 50,000 acres (202 km^{2}) of forest reserve along the McCloud River near Mount Shasta in Northern California. Morgan also did studio and site work for the uncompleted Babicora, Hearst's 1,625,000-acre (6,580 km^{2}) Chihuahua, Mexico, cattle rancho and retreat.

=== YWCA projects ===
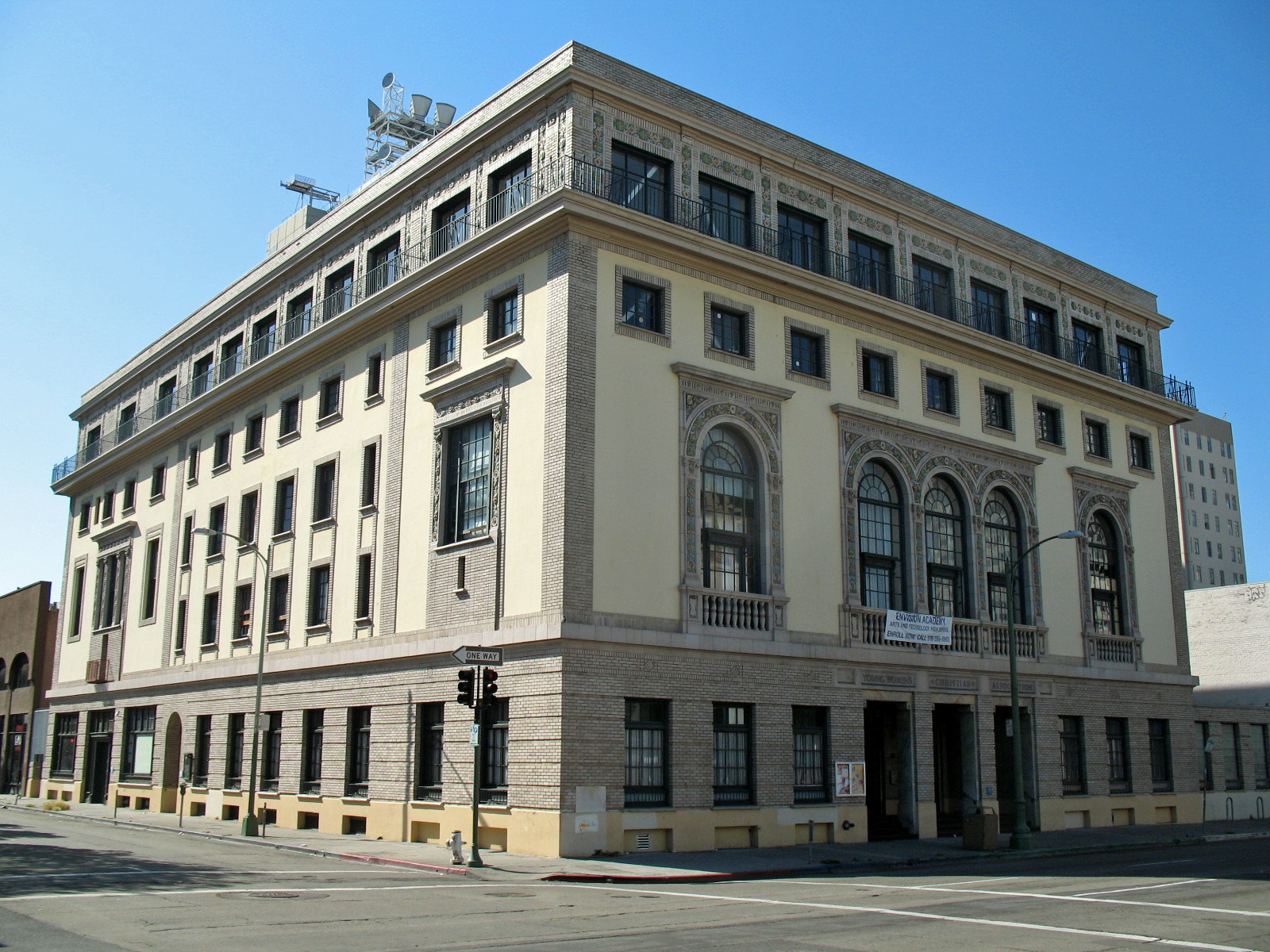
Oakland YWCA, now the Envision Academy of Arts & Technology

Julia Morgan's affiliation with the YWCA began when Phoebe Apperson Hearst recommended her for the organization's Asilomar summer conference center, a project she began in 1913. The Asilomar Conference Grounds, no longer a YWCA property but state-run, still exists in Pacific Grove. Morgan also designed YWCAs in California, Utah, Arizona, and Hawaii.

Five of the Southern California YWCA buildings were designed by Morgan. The 1918 Harbor Area YWCA (San Pedro) in a Craftsman building is still standing, as is the 1926 Hollywood Studio Club YWCA. Morgan's Riverside YWCA from 1929 still stands, but is now the Riverside Art Museum. The "gorgeous" Pasadena YWCA was acquired by the City in 2010 for restoration and public use after several decades of decay. Morgan's 1925 Long Beach Italian Renaissance YWCA has been demolished.

Morgan also designed YWCA buildings in Northern California, including those in Oakland and in San Francisco's Chinatown. The YWCA building in San Francisco reflects her understanding of traditional Chinese architecture. The building was restored in 2001 by the Chinese Historical Society of America (CHSA), and now houses the Chinese Historical Society of America Museum and Learning Center.

=== Mills College ===
Morgan made many architectural contributions to Mills College, a women's college in the East Bay foothills of Oakland. Like her work for the YWCA, they were done in the hopes of advancing opportunities for women.

Mills president Susan Tolman Mills became interested in Morgan in 1904 because she wished to further the career of a female architect and because Morgan, who was early in her career, charged less than her male counterparts. Morgan designed six buildings for the Mills campus, including El Campanil, believed to be the first bell tower on a United States college campus. (El Campanil should not be confused with The Campanile, a nickname for Sather Tower, the bell tower of nearby UC Berkeley.) Morgan helped draft parts of the UC Berkeley campus under John Galen Howard, but the Sather Tower was not her design. Despite being chosen by Mills to design El Campanil and her academic credentials, coworkers such as Bernard Ransome, son of Ernest Ransome, did not trust in Morgan's abilities as a true concrete expert. Ransome's undermining of Morgan's ability led to less trust in her work and praise veiled in gendered rhetoric at the time. For example, a speaker at the dedication ceremony praised El Campanil for being "reared by the genius of a woman's brain."

Morgan's reputation grew when the tower was unscathed by the 1906 San Francisco earthquake. The bells in the tower "were cast for the World's Columbian Exposition (Chicago-1893), and given to Mills by a trustee". This success led to Morgan becoming the unofficial principal architect for Mills College for the next two decades.

She also designed the Margaret Carnegie Library (1906), named after Andrew Carnegie's daughter, and the Ming Quong Home for Chinese Girls, built in 1924 and purchased for Mills in 1936. It was eventually renamed Alderwood Hall, before becoming the Julia Morgan School for Girls in 2004 (independent of the College). Morgan designed the Mills College Student Union in 1916. Morgan's Kapiolani Cottage has served as an infirmary, faculty housing, and administration offices. Morgan also designed the original gymnasium and pool, since replaced by the Tea Shop and Suzanne Adams Plaza.

=== Heritage on the Marina ===
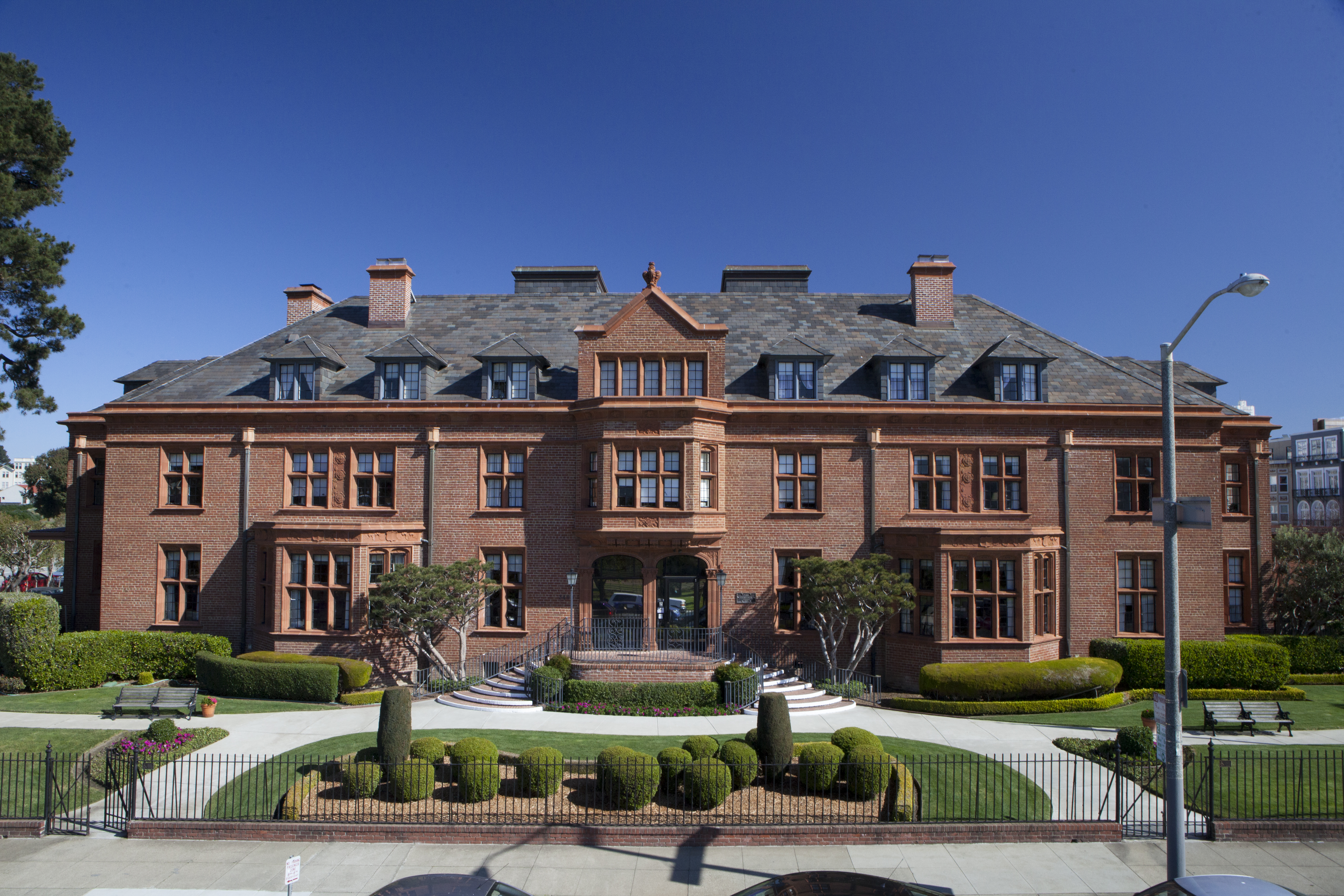
Exterior of Heritage on the Marina, San Francisco, main building

From 1922 to 1925, Morgan was enlisted to design a nursing home to house elderly women in San Francisco. Today the building is home to Heritage on the Marina. The Julia Morgan Building, located at 3400 Laguna Street, is owned and operated by the San Francisco Ladies Protection and Relief Society, one of California’s first philanthropic organizations, established in 1853.

=== Other projects ===
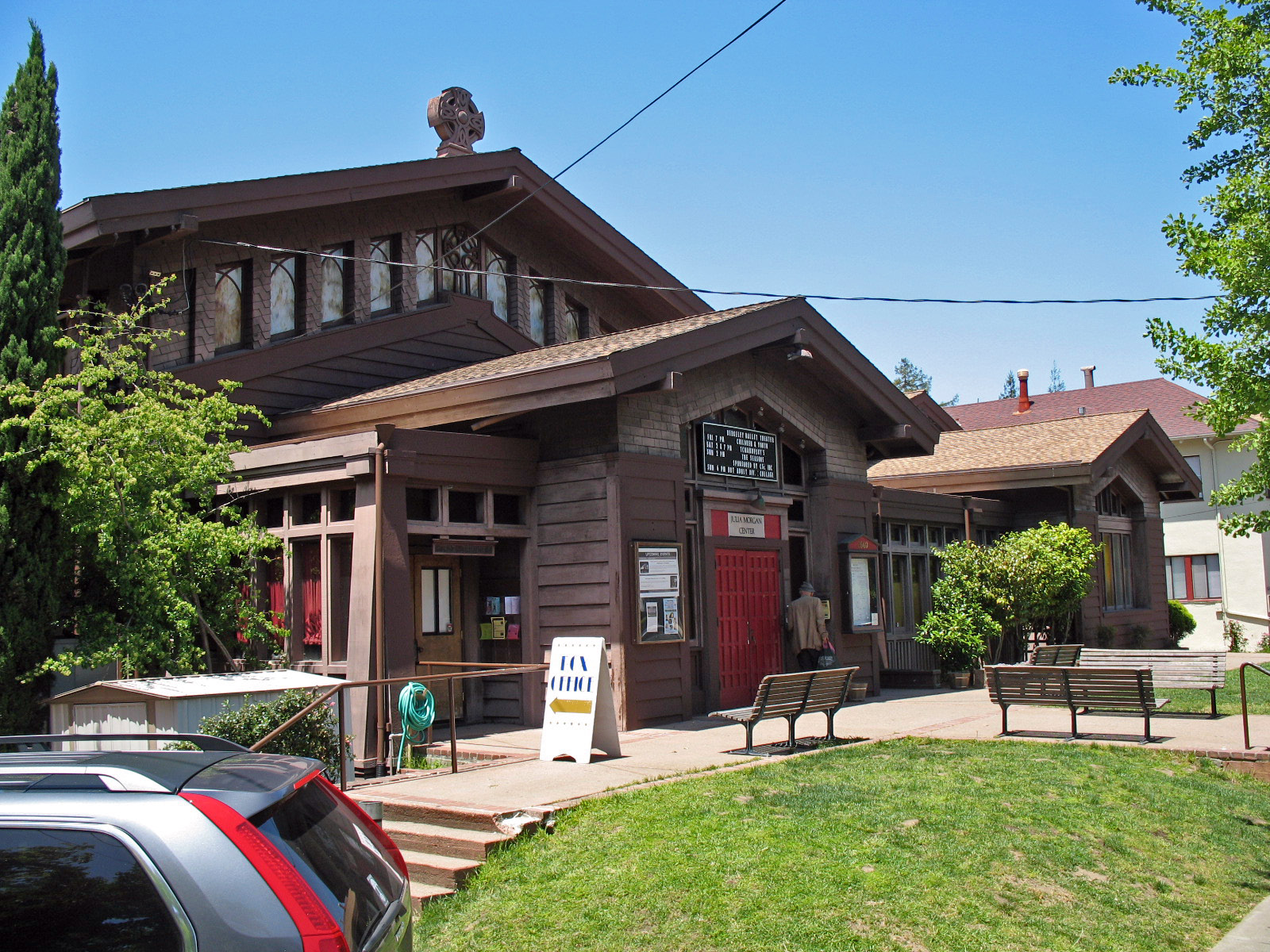
The former St. John's Presbyterian Church, Berkeley, California

Among Morgan's earliest works was the North Star House in Grass Valley, California, commissioned in 1904–05 by mining engineer Arthur De Wint Foote and his wife, the author and illustrator Mary Hallock Foote.

She considered St. John's Presbyterian Church, in Berkeley, California, her finest Craftsman-style building. It is now the Berkeley Playhouse.

Other projects include the Chapel of the Chimes in Oakland; the nearby brick multi-use building at 4021 Piedmont Avenue; the sanctuary of Ocean Avenue Presbyterian Church at 32 Ocean Avenue, San Francisco (where Mission Bay Community Church also meets); and the large Berkeley City Club adjacent to the University of California campus. Morgan designed the World War I YWCA Hostess House in Palo Alto, built in 1918 and later to become the site of the MacArthur Park Restaurant

Some of Morgan's residential projects, most of them located in the San Francisco Bay Area, are ultimate bungalows. The style is often associated with the work of Greene and Greene and some of Morgan's other contemporaries and teachers. The buildings represent the Arts and Crafts Movement and the American Craftsman style of architecture. Several houses are on San Francisco's Russian Hill. One of Morgan’s first residential projects was to remodel and complete Phoebe Hearst’s Hacienda del Pozo de Verona in Pleasanton, in Mediterranean and California Mission style. In 1908, Morgan designed the residence of James Henry Pierce at 1650 The Alameda in San Jose, which features rare California timber.

Morgan designed two houses in Monterey County, California. One, designed in 1915, is the "Little Cottage of River Winds" at 26184 Carmelo Street at Carmel Point, outside the Carmel-by-the-Sea city limits. The other is the "Dr. Emma W. Pope House" at 2981 Franciscan Way, on a hillside overlooking the Carmel Mission. It was built in 1940, in the Minimal Traditional architectural style for Dr. Emma Whitman Pope, who was a friend from Morgan's undergraduate years at UC Berkeley.

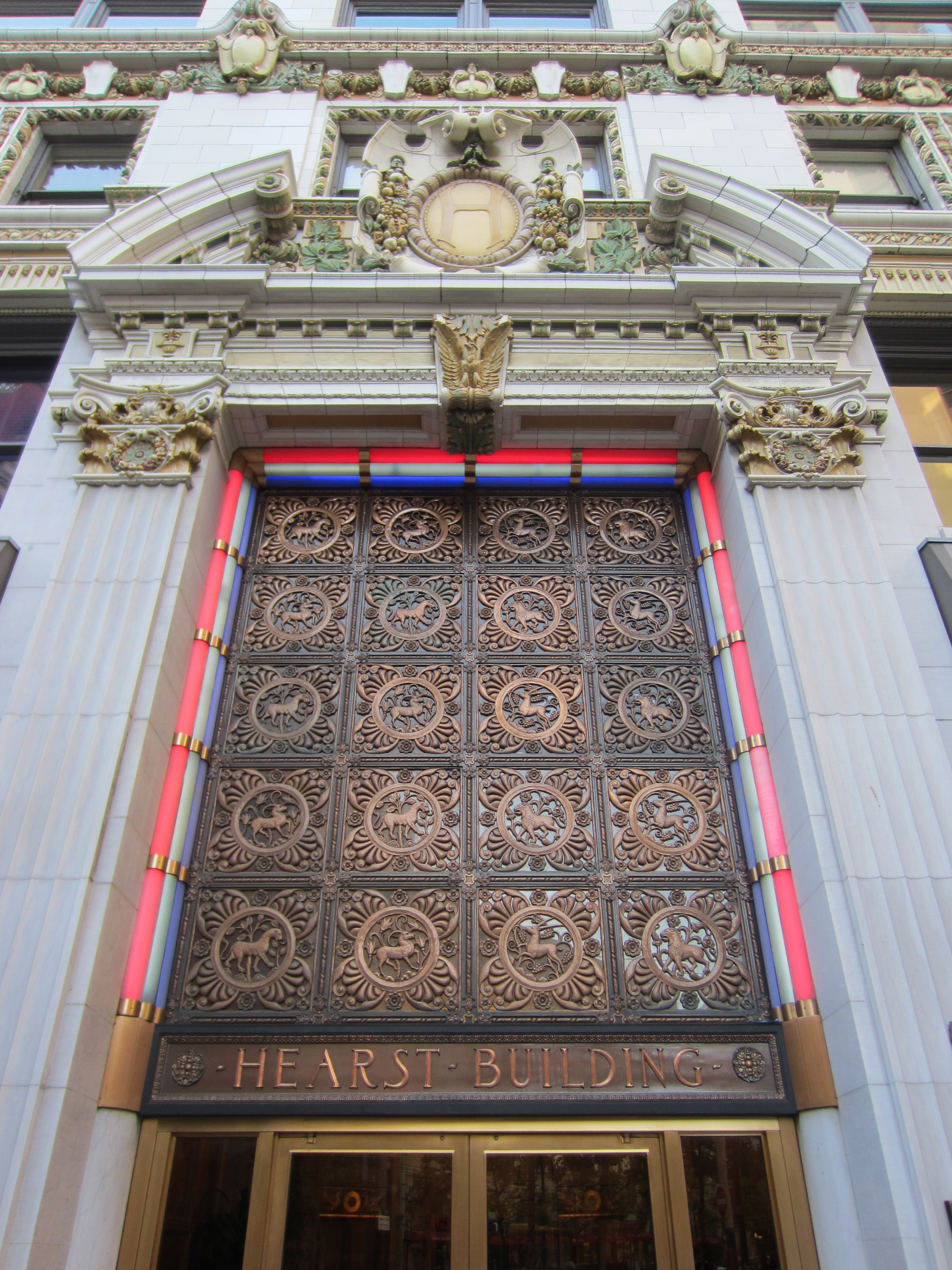
Hearst Building, Market & 3rd, San Francisco, 1937 redesign by Morgan

== Personal life ==
Although Morgan was highly respected as an architect, not much is known about her personal life. She was never married and had no known romantic relationships. She kept a low profile and lived modestly, in spite of her wealthy clientele. Colleagues and acquaintances were surprised by her modest sense of fashion; a coworker even went as far as saying that Morgan dressed like a "nobody." Morgan gave few interviews and did not write about herself. Early interviews used gendered rhetoric to speak about her accomplishments and early newspaper articles followed her progress at the École des Beaux Arts. After that she mostly avoided interviews and only agreed to articles that focused on her work to advance her reputation. She worked tirelessly on minimal sleep and food.

Morgan was very independent. During her move to Paris she had a fund given to her by her parents for all of her first-year expenses. Even when her funds ran out, she never asked her family for any extra money, but instead learned to live on a tight budget. This experience gave her a concrete understanding of how to handle money efficiently, which helped make her a successful businesswoman after she opened her own practice, and helped her to focus on keeping her projects within her clients' budgets.

One of the few public awards she accepted was the University of California, Berkeley, honorary Doctor of Laws degree, its highest award, conferred upon her on May 15, 1929, with the following personal tribute: "distinguished alumna of the University of California, artist and engineer; designer of simple dwellings and of stately homes, of great buildings nobly planned to further the centralized activities of her fellow citizens; architect in whose works harmony and admirable proportions bring pleasure to the eye and peace to the mind."

Intrigued with the gaps in Julia Morgan's life story, Belinda Taylor wrote Becoming Julia Morgan, a 2012 play in which Taylor imagines a plausible life story for Morgan.

== Death and legacy ==
My buildings will be my legacy... they will speak for me long after I'm gone.

— Julia Morgan

Julia Morgan died on February 2, 1957, in San Francisco, California, at age 85. She was buried at Mountain View Cemetery in the hills of Oakland.

In 1995, the ballroom at the Merchants Exchange Building in San Francisco, where she had her office from 1907 to 1950, was named the Julia Morgan Ballroom.

In 1999, a Mediterranean Revival residence in Sacramento, California, designed and built by Morgan in 1918 for Charles Goethe, was renamed the Julia Morgan House. It had been added to the National Register of Historic Places in 1982.

In 2006, a children's picture book titled Julia Morgan Built a Castle was published and is available in many public libraries.

On May 28, 2008, California Governor Arnold Schwarzenegger and First Lady Maria Shriver announced that Julia Morgan would be inducted into the California Hall of Fame, located at The California Museum for History, Women and the Arts in Sacramento. The induction ceremony took place on December 15 and Morgan's great-niece accepted the honor on her behalf.

Julia Morgan was the 2014 recipient (posthumous) of the AIA Gold Medal, the highest award of the American Institute of Architects (AIA). She was the first female architect to receive this honor.

== Sketches ==
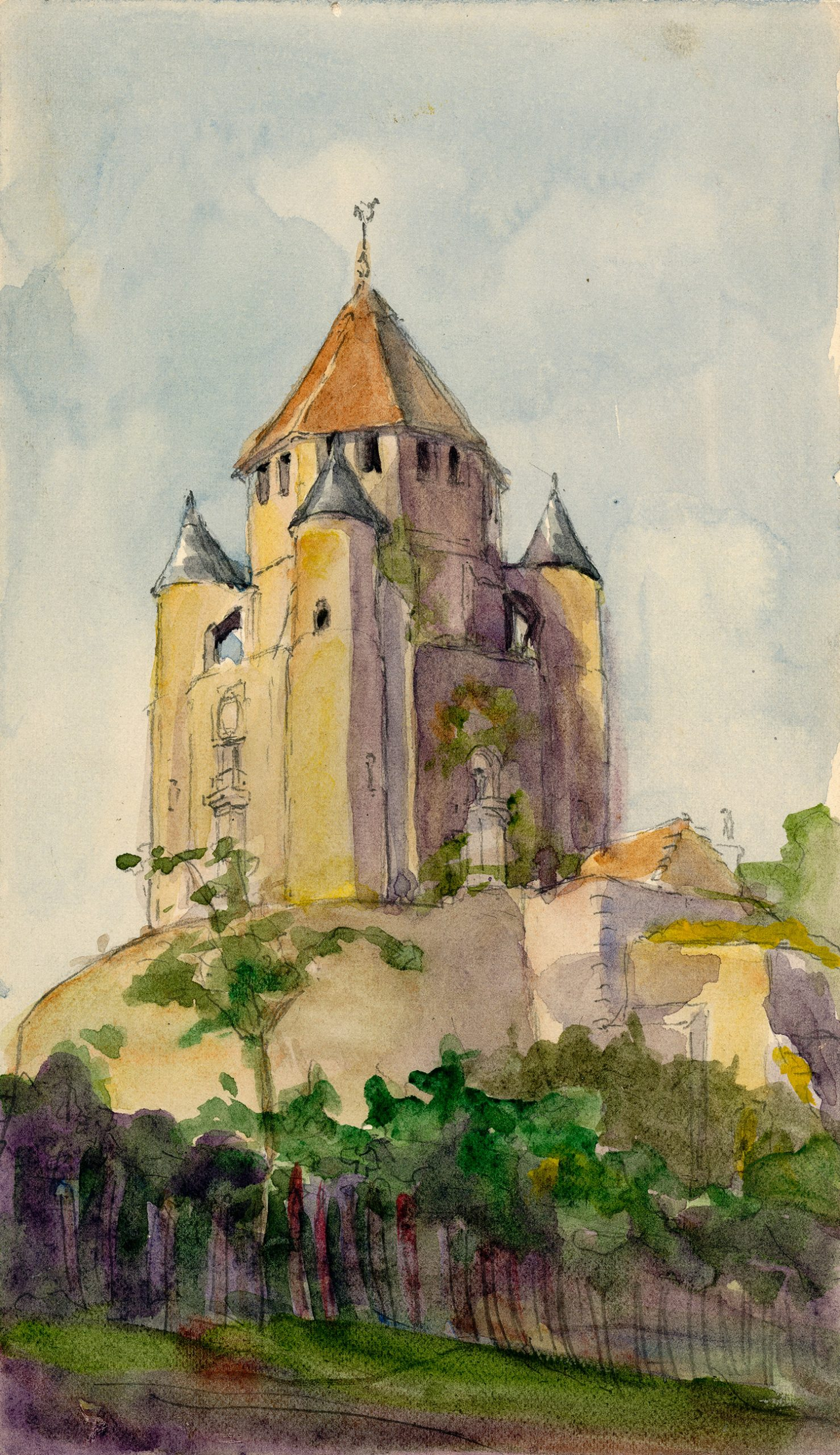
Watercolor of the Tour Cesar, Provins, France, circa 1898 By Julia Morgan

== Gallery ==
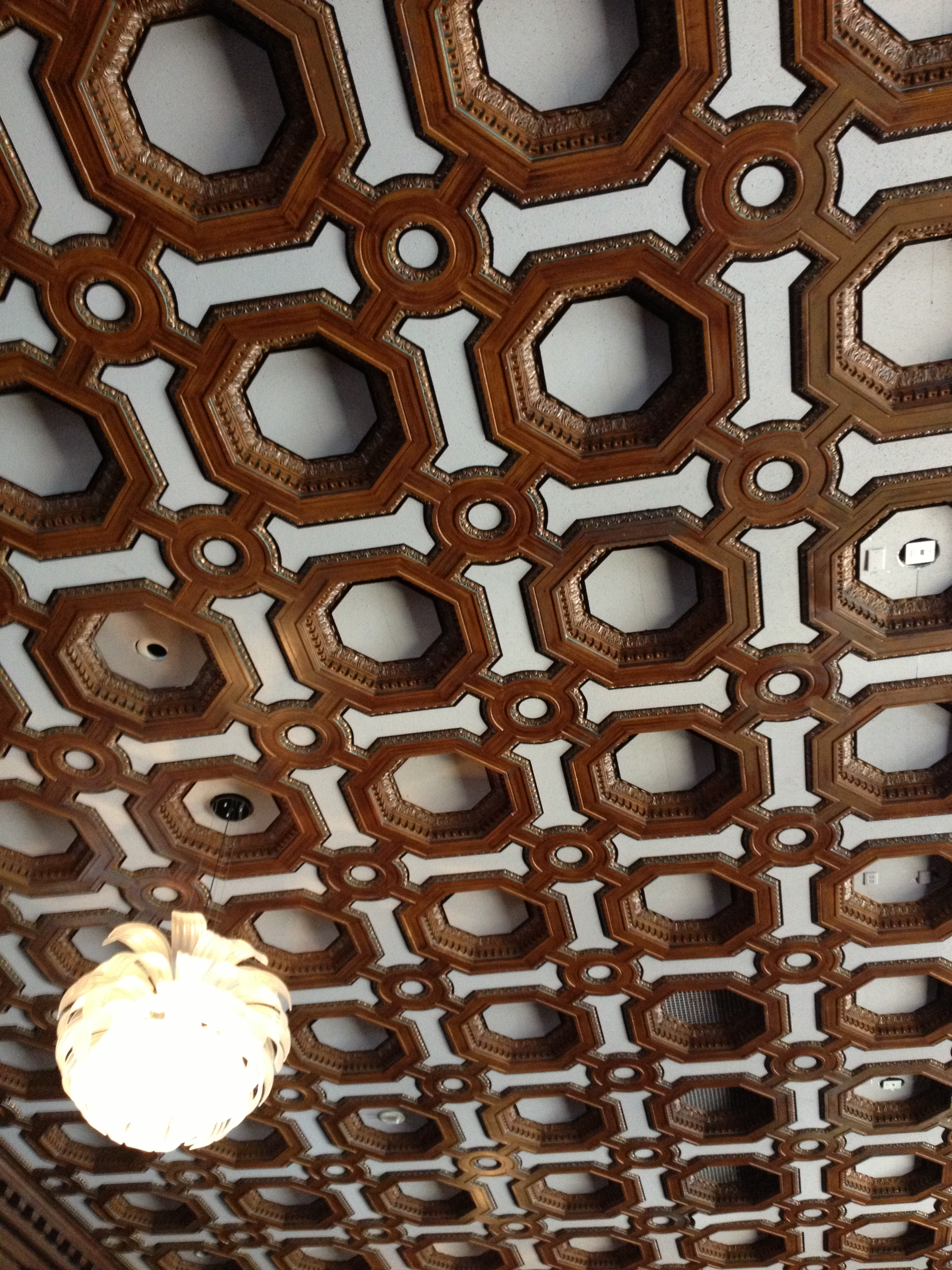
Ceiling of the Julia Morgan Ballroom, Merchants Exchange Building, San Francisco

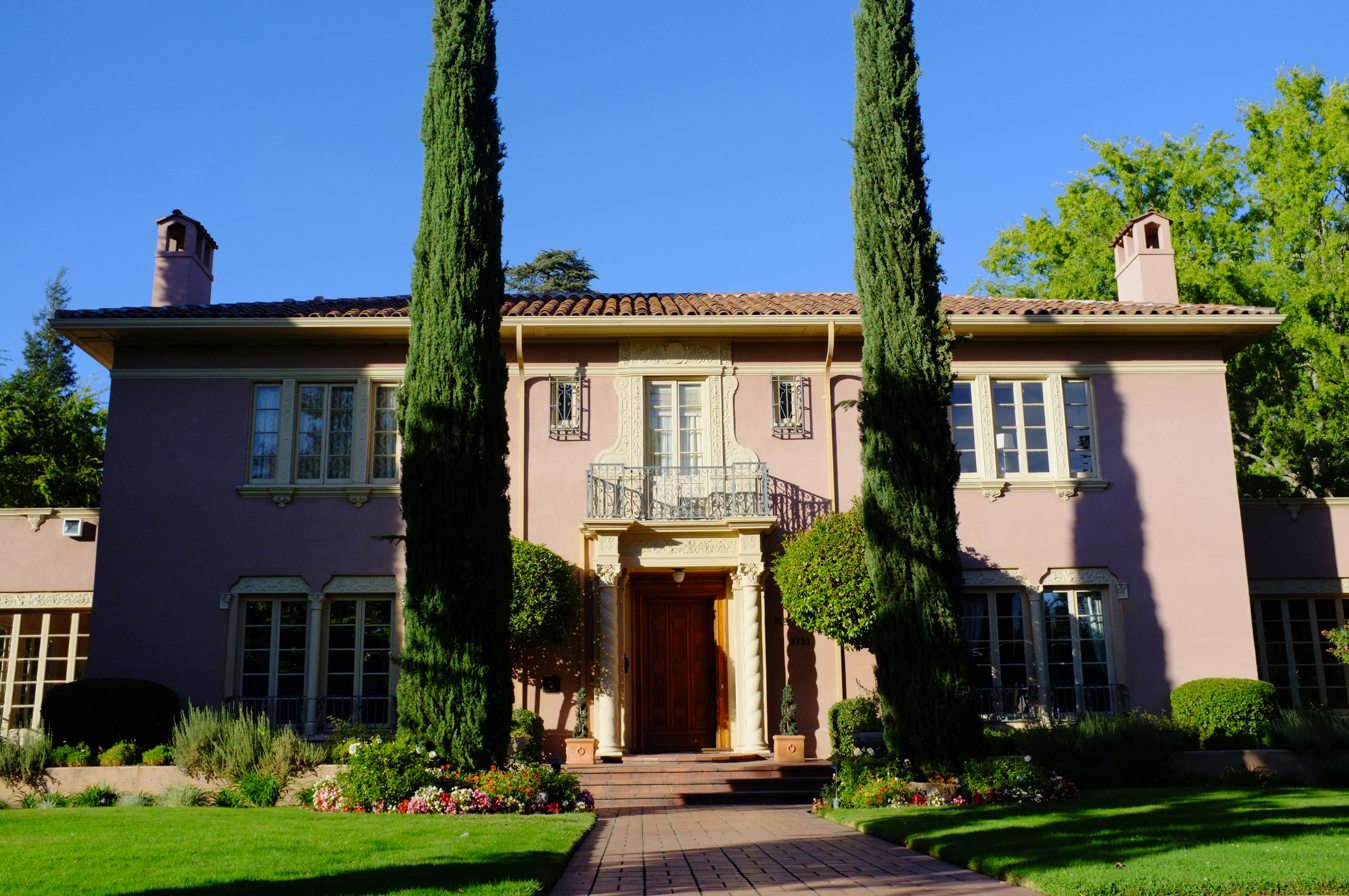
Julia Morgan House, Sacramento, California

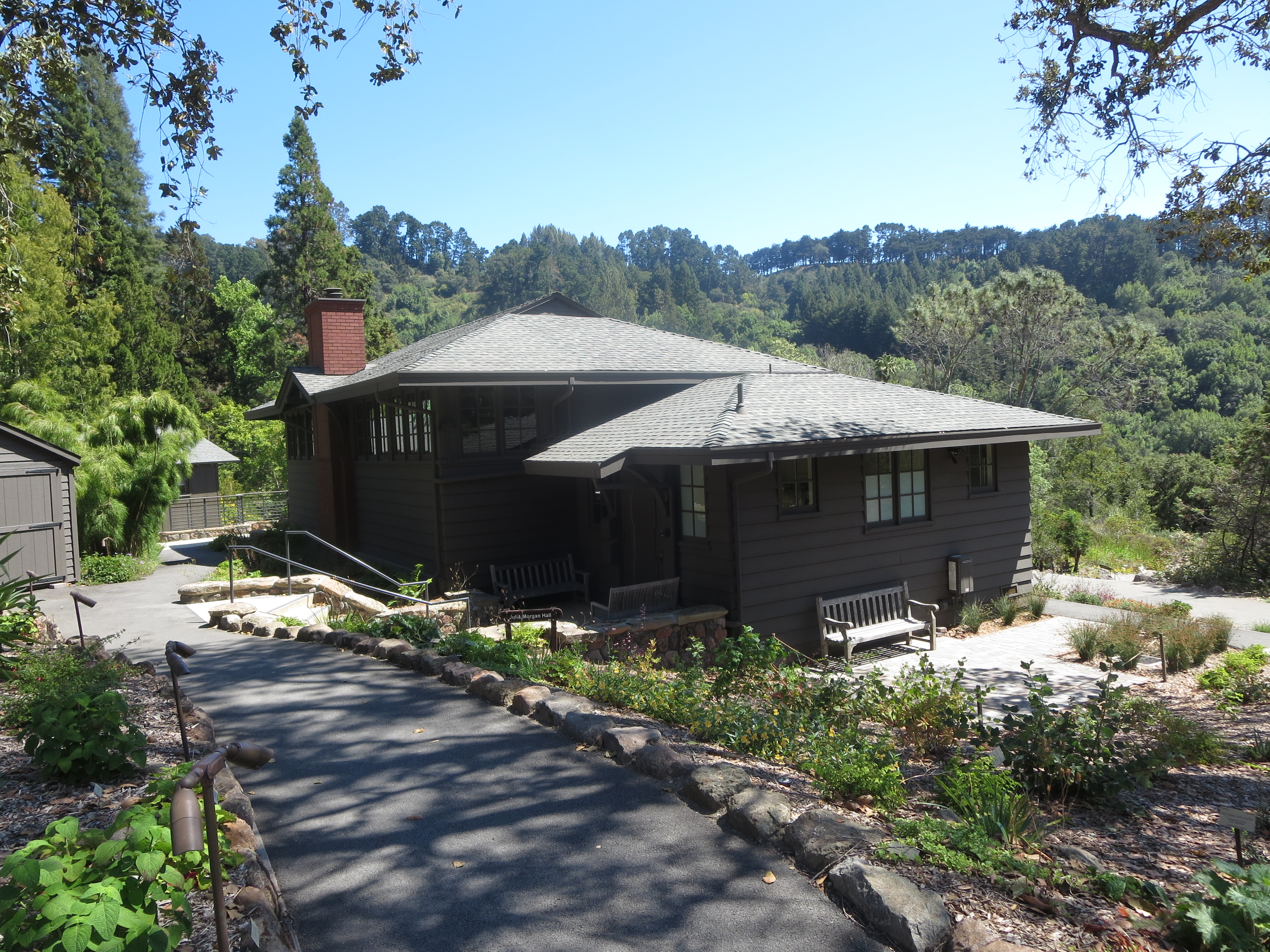
Julia Morgan Hall, University of California Botanical Garden, Berkeley

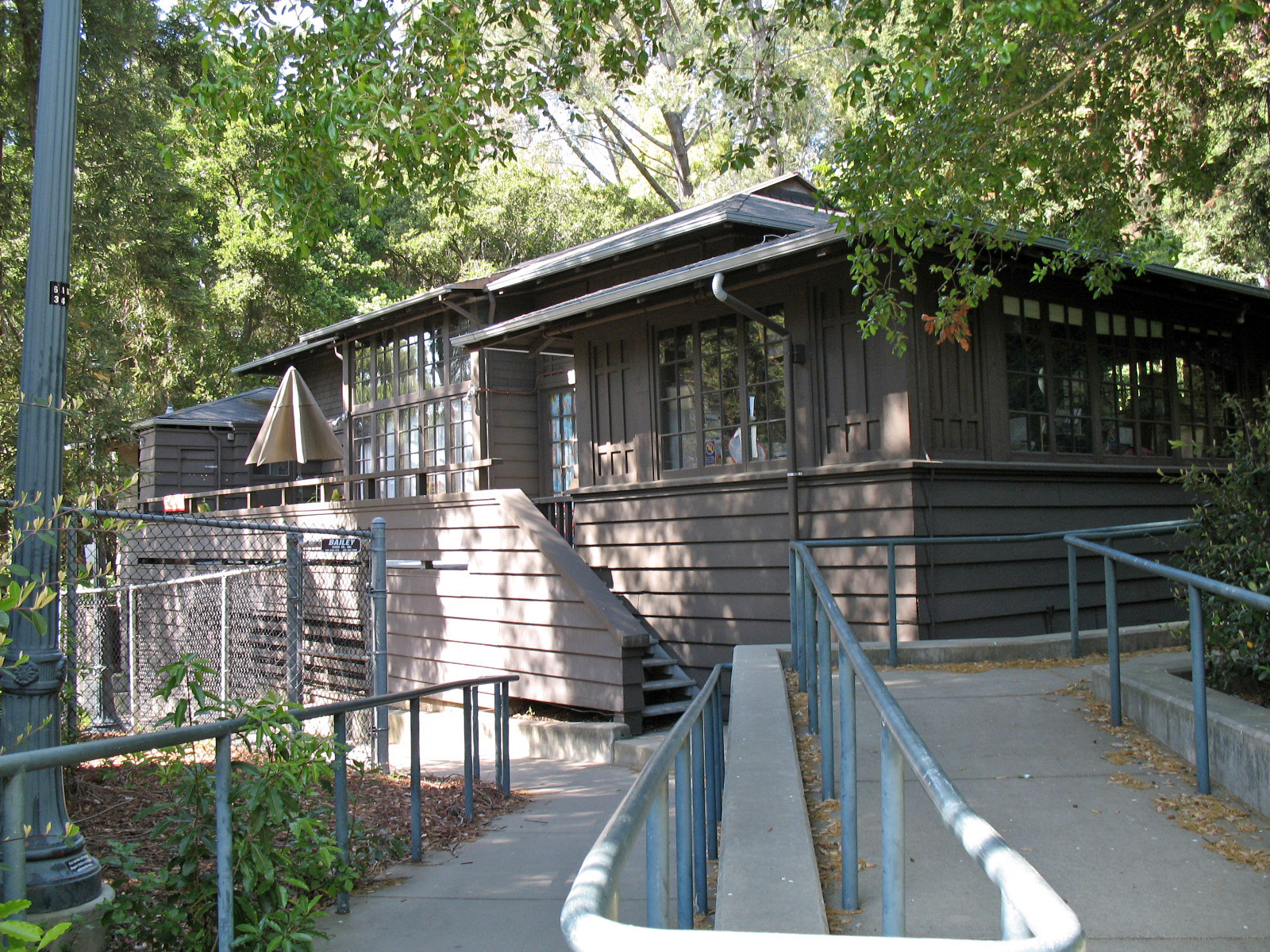
Girton Hall, Berkeley

== See also ==
- Women in architecture
- California Hall of Fame
