= Sylvie Fortier =

Canadian synchronized swimmer

Personal information
- Born: July 31, 1958 (age 67) Quebec City, Quebec, Canada
- Years active: 1968–1977

Sport
- Sport: Synchronized swimming
- Club: Synchro Elite du Quebec
Medal record
Synchronized swimming
Representing Canada
World Aquatics Championships
Silver medal – second place	1975 Cali	Solo
Silver medal – second place	1975 Cali	Team
Pan American Games
Silver medal – second place	1971 Cali	Team
Silver medal – second place	1975 Mexico City	Solo

Sylvie Fortier (born July 31, 1958) is a Canadian former synchronized swimmer. She won medals in Canadian provincial and national competitions, at the World Aquatics Championships, the Pan American Games and the Pan Pacific Games. Fortier was named the 1976 world champion in synchronized swimming for her achievements that year and was a torch bearer for the opening ceremony of the Montreal Summer Olympics. She retired in 1977 aged just 18. Fortier is an inductee of Canada's Sports Hall of Fame and the Aquatics Hall of Fame.

== Personal background and early career ==
On July 31, 1958, Fortier was born in Quebec City, Quebec. She took up swimming with the successful Synchro Élite du Québec club in 1968, and she and her teammates were coached by Suzanne Eon.

== Career ==
As a member of the seven-swimmer Canadian squad, Fortier won the silver medal in the synchronized swimming team competition at the 1971 Pan American Games. Her team claimed the gold medal in provincial competition, and won two gold medals in the figures and solo disciplines at the national championships in 1973. In May 1974, Fortier won the gold medal in each of the open and closed solo (with her partner Linda Bedard) competitions of that year's Canadian Senior Synchronized Swimming Championships. She traveled to Ottawa to compete in the 1974 World Invitational Solo Synchronized Swimming Championships as part of the Pan Pacific Games held at the Nepean Sportsplex that September. Fortier took the silver medal in both the figure and team events.

She continued to attain success in 1975. At the Central Canada Regional Synchronized Swimming Championship held at the Brewer Centennial Pool in April of that year, Fortier won gold medals in each of her events. She went on to clinch the gold medal in the solo competition at the Senior Canadian Synchronized Swimming Championships later that year. At the 1975 World Aquatics Championships in Cali, Fortier finished second for the solo event silver medal in the synchronized swimming discipline. She also took the silver medal in the team event at the same competition. Fortier went on to take another solo silver medal in the synchronized swimming competition at the 1975 Pan American Games in Mexico City.

In 1976, she would continue her run of achievements. Fortier teamed up with Bedard and held off Nancy Good and Helen Vanderburg of the Calgary Aquabelles to win the gold medal in the closed and open events of the Canadian Senior National Synchronized Swimming Championships for the third year in a row that May. She also added victories in the provincial events. Fortier was one of 190 eligible athletes deemed suitable to receive federal aid after a process of nomination and evaluation by Sport Canada. Fortier served as a torch bearer for the 1976 Summer Olympics opening ceremony in Montreal. At the 1976 Scandinavian Open Synchronized Swimming Championships in Nässjö that August, she won both the solo and figures events for a duo of gold medals. Fortier traveled to Japan the following month and won the solo discipline against American outdoor champion Robin Curren at the Pan Pacific Games. She was named synchronized swimming's world champion following her achievements in 1976.

Fortier announced her retirement from active competition at age 18 in February 1977. She said in an interview that she was happy with what she had achieved throughout her career and wanted to pursue other activities.

== Accolades ==
At the Sports Federations of Canada awards banquet in January 1976, Fortier was named the top junior athlete "for her prowess in synchronized swimming." She was inducted into Canada's Sports Hall of Fame in the athletes category in 1977. The following year, she was inducted into the Aquatics Hall of Fame. The Sylvie Fortier Award was named after the synchronized swimmer and was first presented in 1984. The accolade is presented by Canada Artistic Swimming to the province "for the best membership growth percentage in the sport of Artistic Swimming."
