= Synchronized swimming at the 1975 Pan American Games =

- No. of events: 3

Synchronized swimming at the 1975 Pan American Games was held from 12 to 26 October1975 in Mexico City, Mexico. There were three medal events.

== Medal table ==
Rank	Nation	Gold	Silver	Bronze	Total
1	United States (USA)	3	0	0	3
2	Canada (CAN)	0	3	0	3
3	Cuba (CUB)	0	0	2	2
4	Mexico (MEX)	0	0	1	1
Totals (4 entries)		3	3	3	9

== Medalists ==
Event	Gold	Silver	Bronze
Solo	Gail Johnson; United States	Sylvie Fortier; Canada	Lourdes de la Guardia; Cuba
Duet	United States (USA); Robin Curren; Amanda Norrish	Canada (CAN); Carol Stewart; Laura Wilkin	Cuba (CUB); Alicia Foyo; Sandra Martínez
Team	United States (USA); Sue Baross; Michele Barone; Gail Johnson; Mary Ellen Longo; Amanda Norrish; Linda Shelley; Pam Tryon	Canada (CAN)	Mexico (MEX)
