= Gail Johnson =

American synchronized swimmer

Personal information
- Nationality: American
- Born: 1954 (age 71–72)

Sport
- Sport: Synchronized swimming
Medal record
Representing United States
World Championships
Gold medal – first place	1973 Belgrade	Duet
Gold medal – first place	1973 Belgrade	Team
Gold medal – first place	1975 Cali	Solo
Gold medal – first place	1975 Cali	Team
Pan American Games
Gold medal – first place	1975 Mexico City	Solo
Gold medal – first place	1975 Mexico City	Team

Gail Johnson (later Buzonas; born 1954) is an American synchronized swimming competitor who won four gold medals at the world championships in 1973 and 1975. After retiring from competition she had a long career as a national synchronized swimming coach. In 1983, she was inducted into the International Swimming Hall of Fame.

== See also ==
- List of members of the International Swimming Hall of Fame
