= Sue Baross Nesbitt =

American synchronized swimmer and coach

Personal information
- Born: 1954 (age 71–72) Riverside, California, United States

Sport
- Sport: Synchronised swimming
Medal record
Representing United States
World Championships
Gold medal – first place	1973 Belgrade	Team
Gold medal – first place	1975 Cali	Team
Pan American Games
Gold medal – first place	1975 Mexico City	Team

Sue Baross Nesbitt, (born 1954) is an American synchronized swimming champion and international coach. She is currently the head coach with the Riverside Aquettes in Riverside, California.

== Swimming career ==
Sue Baross was a member of the Santa Clara Aquamaids when they won the first world team title in 1973 and swam with them while they were Senior National Team Champions in both indoor and outdoor from 1973 through 1977.

In 1973, she was a member of the American team that won first place at the World Championships in Belgrade, Yugoslavia.

1974 was a busy year as she and Gail Johnson were Outdoor Senior National Duet Champions, as well as taking first at the I Pan Pacific in Honolulu and the All Japan Invitational. The Santa Clara Aquamaids, also took first at the Pan Pacific and the All Japan Invitational that year.

She was Outdoor Junior National Solo Champion in 1975 and also swam with Team USA when they came in first both at the 1975 World Aquatics Championships in Cali, Colombia, and the Pan American Games in Mexico City that same year. She was the U.S. senior national solo champion for Outdoor in 1976, going on to take both indoor and outdoor in 1977 while also taking the duet title with Linda Shelley, again for both indoor and outdoor. She went on to take the gold medal as a soloist at the Mexico City Pan Pacific Games of 1977 during which her team took first overall once more. At the 1977 Swiss Open in Bern, Switzerland, she won for solo and with Linda Shelley for duet while their team took first yet again.

In all 4 years as a United States National Team Member, she received 14 International titles and 18 National titles, including 2 World championships.

In 1977, she was a finalist for the James E. Sullivan Award for Amateur Athlete of the Year, while also receiving recognition as a member of the Women's Sports Foundation Hall of Fame and a member of the Citizens Savings Hall of Fame, the latter of which again inducted her the following year.

== Riverside Aquettes ==
Along with sister Molly Baross, Sue Baross Nesbitt began synchronized swimming as a child with the Riverside Aquettes in Riverside, CA. When she first began swimming, the Riverside Aquettes practiced at the downtown YWCA building, now the Riverside Art Museum, which had been designed by Julia Morgan. When the building was sold, and the club lost their practice pool, her father organized with other parents to keep the group going.

During her teen years, she swam with Riverside Polytechnic High School while they took three league championships.

Sue Baross moved to Northern California after completing high school in order to gain better training under the guidance of coach Kay Vilen. There was some controversy at the time as Vilen's ability to attract the best swimmers from elsewhere quickly made the Santa Clara Aquamaids into the winningest club throughout the 1970s.

== Coaching career ==
As a coach, Sue Nesbitt worked with the Canadian National Synchronized Swim Team throughout the 1980s. She also coached the 1984 Australian Olympic team, which competed in the Los Angeles games in the first year that Synchronized Swimming was included. She received recognition as Coach of the Year in Ontario, Canada, in 1983 and again in Nova Scotia, Canada, in 1989.

In 1999 and again in 2002, Sue Nesbitt received recognition as Age Group Developmental coach of the Year for her work with the Riverside Aquettes. In 2012, she was inducted into the Riverside Sports Hall of Fame. While head coach at the Riverside Aquettes, the team won the 2006 national junior championship. As a strong proponent of healthy living, she encourages young swimmers to learn good nutrition, admonishing poor habits while avoiding body shaming.

Sue has also been able to work with a variety of musicians and popular bands to create music videos or shows. She has worked with Aerosmith, Red Hot Chili Peppers, to name a few.

In 2005 she coached the USA Senior Team at the World Championships. In 2006 she coached the Junior National team to the Junior World Championships. In 2010, she coached the U.S. Junior National Team alongside Kim Wurzel-Lo Porto, member of the 2000 U.S. Olympic Team, and has worked as a consultant with the U.S. National Team since 1996.

In 2018, Sue decided she wanted to get back in the water again as a swimmer. She was looking for a different coaching style, that needed research. She wanted to know what it felt like to be coached again. She started swimming competitively again. This changed her coaching philosophy and style for the better. She has been successful in this second chance at competition, she won the solo and duet events at the 2017 World Masters Championships and defended her solo title at the next 2019 World Masters Championships. She is hoping to continue to compete as long as she is able to as Synchronized swimming has show to help to slow the aging process.

== Family ==
Her daughters Stephanie Nesbitt and Barb Nesbitt are also champion synchronized swimmers.

== Television and film appearances ==
Sue Nesbitt has appeared as herself in the television series Switched! in an episode featuring Brooke Abel and in the 2008 documentary Sync or Swim, which follows swimmers as they compete for a spot on the 2004 U.S. Olympic team.
