= Brooke Abel =

American synchronized swimmer

Personal information
- Full name: Brooke Abel
- National team: United States
- Born: February 15, 1988 (age 38) Northridge, California
- Height: 5 ft 4 in (1.63 m)
- Weight: 115 lb (52 kg)

Sport
- Sport: Swimming
- Strokes: Synchronized swimming
- Club: Riverside Aquettes

Brooke Abel (born February 15, 1988) is an American synchronized swimmer who competed in the women's team event at the 2008 Summer Olympics.

Brooke began swimming with the Riverside AQuettes as a child and trained under Sue Baross Nesbitt. In 2003, Brooke Abel, Meryl Grandia, and Caitlin Stewart were Junior National Trio Champions. She went on to swim with the American team at the IX Junior World Championships in Moscow, Russia, in 2004, where they placed 4th.

Brooke Abel also appeared on an episode of the television series Switched in 2003.
