= Synchronised swimming at the 1975 World Aquatics Championships =

These are the results from the synchronised swimming competition at the 1975 World Aquatics Championships.

== Medal table ==
Rank	Nation	Gold	Silver	Bronze	Total
1	United States (USA)	3	0	0	3
2	Canada (CAN)	0	3	0	3
3	Japan (JPN)	0	0	3	3
Totals (3 entries)		3	3	3	9

== Medal summary ==
Event	Gold	Silver	Bronze
Solo routine	Gail Johnson (USA); 133.083	Sylvie Fortier (CAN); 130.866	Yasuko Unezaki (JPN); 126.616
Duet routine	Robin Curren (USA); Amanda Norrish (USA); 129.4335	Carol Stewart (CAN); Laura Wilkin (CAN); 127.7330	Masako Fujiwara (JPN); Yasuko Fujiwara (JPN); 126.0995
Team routine	United States (USA); 128.812	Canada (CAN); 125.129	Japan (JPN); 123.691
