= Charles Goethe =

American eugenicist, entrepreneur, land developer, philanthropist, conservationist

- Born: March 28, 1875; Sacramento, California, U.S.
- Died: July 10, 1966 (aged 91); Sacramento, California, U.S.
- Occupation: Eugenicist
- Known for: founder of Eugenics Society of Northern California and the California State University, Sacramento
- Spouse: Mary Glide

Charles Matthias Goethe (March 28, 1875 – July 10, 1966) was an American eugenicist, entrepreneur, land developer, philanthropist, conservationist, founder of the Eugenics Society of Northern California, and a native and lifelong resident of Sacramento, California.

== Early life ==
Charles M. Goethe was born on March 28, 1875, in Sacramento, California. He pronounced his last name as GAY-tee. Goethe's grandparents had immigrated to California from Germany in the 1870s. Charles’ father was interested in agriculture and wild life. Both men also pursued careers in real estate as Charles made most of his money as a real estate broker. Charles had passed the bar exam but did not pursue a career in law.

As a child, Charles was interested in agriculture, biology, and the human body. In his diary, he kept a record of his diet and exercise, specifically noting days in which his regimen was not sufficient. Goethe's additional childhood interest in various plants and animals evolved as he pressed and catalogued his findings. His ideas concerning nature tied into his later views on eugenics, as he connected the evolution of nature to heredity. Goethe explained in his memoir Seeking to Serve that his original interest in eugenics began as a child.

== Nature guide movement ==
Goethe (German pronunciation: [ˈɡøːtə] and occasionally incorrectly as "Gaytee" ) wrote admiringly of California’s Forty-Niners, the State’s giant redwood trees, and loved the outdoors. Goethe worked with organizations including the Sierra Club and the Audubon Society. He and his wife have been called "The father and mother of the Nature Guide Movement,' initiating interpretive programs with the U.S. National Park Service. The National Park Service made Goethe the “Honorary Chief Naturalist” for his work in this field. This was motivated by their experience with nature programs in Europe and desire to educate visitors in the U.S. National Parks. His motto was "Learn to Read the Trail-side as a Book." Goethe encouraged the general public to educate themselves about the evolution of nature as well, personally spending time dedicated to learning about different plants and animals. He later introduced the Boy Scouts to Sacramento, due to his interest in furthering biological education for children. As an adult, Goethe was a conservationist who worked to implement park rangers into national parks.

== Founder of Sacramento State College ==
Goethe founded California State University, Sacramento (Sacramento State College at the time), which in turn treated Goethe with the reverence of a founding father, appointed him chairman of the university's advisory board, dedicated the Goethe Arboretum to him in 1961, and organized an elaborate gala and 'national recognition day' to mark his 90th birthday in 1965, when he received letters of appreciation – solicited by his friends at CSUS – from the president of the Nature Conservancy, then-Governor Edmund G. Brown, and then-President Lyndon B. Johnson. As a result, in 1963, Goethe changed his will to make CSUS his primary beneficiary, bequeathing his residence, eugenics library, papers, and $640,000 to the university.

When Goethe died, CSUS received the largest share of his $24 million estate.

== Eugenics controversy ==
Charles Goethe worked near Arizona, focusing on health conditions in the 1920s. Following his work in Arizona, Goethe desired to understand “the extent of the mestizo peril to the American ‘seed stock.'" Essentially, Goethe was determined to establish the threat of Mexicans to the American population, in a eugenic sense. As a result, Goethe created the Immigration Study Commission. With the efforts of his organization, Goethe aimed to ban Mexican entry into the United States of America. In addition, Goethe portrayed Mexicans as carriers of different diseases and germs. While he believed that certain Mexicans could appear as free of disease, they could in fact be silent carriers due to their health practices. His ideas contributed to 1920s perceptions that the American melting pot had begun to integrate germs from certain races, specifically the Mexican race.

Goethe was a strong proponent of positive eugenics. His mentor was eugenicist Madison Grant, with whom he shared strong anti-immigrant beliefs. Like Grant, Goethe promoted his anti-immigrant and racist ideas through pamphlets and other tracts, and he lobbied with politicians and other bureaucrats. Goethe created tiny pamphlets that he distributed to explain his beliefs concerning specific ethnic groups. In these booklets, he explained the importance of family planning and eugenic practices to ensure the superiority of certain races. He invested nearly 1 million dollars to produce and distribute these pamphlets to influence public perceptions. In addition to investing in these booklets, Goethe also invested in research for plant and biological genetics.

Goethe also recommended compulsory sterilization of the 'socially unfit', opposed immigration, and praised German scientists who used a comprehensive sterilization program to 'purify' the Aryan race before the outbreak of World War II. Goethe also funded anti-Asian campaigns, praised the Nazis before and after World War II, and practiced discrimination in his business dealings, refusing to sell real estate to Mexicans and Asians.

Goethe believed a variety of social successes (wealth, leadership, intellectual discoveries) and social problems (poverty, illegitimacy, crime and mental illness) could be traced to inherited biological attributes associated with 'racial temperament'.

Working with the Human Betterment Foundation in Pasadena, California, Goethe lobbied the State to restrict immigration from Mexico and carry out involuntary sterilizations of mostly poor women, defined as 'feeble-minded' or 'socially inadequate' by medical authorities between 1909 and the 1960s.

Goethe was also involved in the publication of multiple journals in which he expressed his views on eugenics. Goethe was involved with the journal Survey Graphic, serving as a member of the council. The journal had published information about typhus quarantines in Mexico in both 1916 and 1917. In addition to Survey Graphic, Goethe was also featured in the journal Eugenics and explained his beliefs that Mexicans were the 'dirt of society'. In the journal from the American Eugenics Society, he explained that Mexicans were as low as Negros, and did not understand basic health rules, but also resisted healthy practices. In his articles, Goethe also explained that Mexicans and South Europeans were responsible for stealing jobs from Americans and introducing germs to the people.

Upon return from a trip to Germany 1934, which at the time was sterilizing over 5,000 citizens per month, Goethe reportedly told a fellow eugenicist, "You will be interested to know that your work has played a powerful part in shaping the opinions of the group of intellectuals who are behind Hitler in this epoch-making program. Everywhere I sensed that their opinions have been tremendously stimulated by American thought...I want you, my dear friend, to carry this thought with you for the rest of your life, that you have really jolted into action a great government of 60 million people." The Nazi eugenics movement eventually escalated to become The Holocaust, which claimed the lives of well over 10 million 'undesirables', including 6 million Jews.

In Sacramento, during Goethe's life, the advocacy of eugenics, the social philosophy of attempting to 'improve' the human population by artificial selection, was considered a progressive issue. Though it was opposed by many scientists who thought the understanding of human heredity was too shallow to create solid policy, and by religious leaders who opposed birth control of any form, in the years after the Holocaust it was not considered to be as radical as it is today. Around 20,000 patients in California State psychiatric hospital system were sterilized with minimal or non-existent consent given between 1909 and 1950, when the law went into general disuse before its repeal in the 1960s. A favorable report by Human Betterment Foundation workers E.S. Gosney and Paul B. Popenoe, touting the results of the sterilizations in California, was published in the late 1920s, which in turn was often cited by the Nazi government as evidence wide-reaching sterilization programs were feasible and humane. When Nazi administrators went on trial for war crimes in Nuremberg after World War II, they justified their mass sterilizations by pointing at the United States as their inspiration.

CSUS attempted to name a new science building after him in 1965, but that effort was rebuffed by students and teachers. In 2005, the university changed the name of its arboretum and botanic garden from the Charles M. Goethe Arboretum to the University Arboretum without fanfare because of renewed attention to Goethe's virulently racist views, praise of Nazi Germany, and advocacy for eugenics.

On June 21, 2007, the school board of the Sacramento City Unified School District voted to rename the "Charles M. Goethe Middle School" to the "Rosa Parks Middle School".

On January 29, 2008, the Sacramento County Board of Supervisors stripped his name from one of Sacramento County's busiest parks. On April 25, 2008, the Sacramento Bee reported that, with a nod from Internet voters and the county parks commission, the park will be renamed River Bend Park.

== Personal life ==
Charles Goethe married Mary Glide in 1903. Glide came from a wealthy family and Goethe attempted to court Mary nine times before she accepted his offer. According to Goethe, his wife Mary had refused his proposals since she feared that he was solely interested in her wealth. In addition, she rejected his attempts due to the fact that she was struggling with infertility. The Goethes owned multiple ranches and invested money in the stock market, becoming a wealthy family. At the time of her death in 1946, Mary's estate was worth $1.5 million. Her husband, Charles Goethe, had an estate worth $24 million when he died on July 10, 1966. Charles Goethe did not have any children, presumably due to Mary's infertility.

== Books ==
- Manuelito of the Red Zerape by C. M. Goethe

== See also ==
- Goethe House
- Eugenics in the United States
