= Julia Morgan House =

Mansion in Sacramento, California, US

- Goethe House
- U.S. National Register of Historic Places
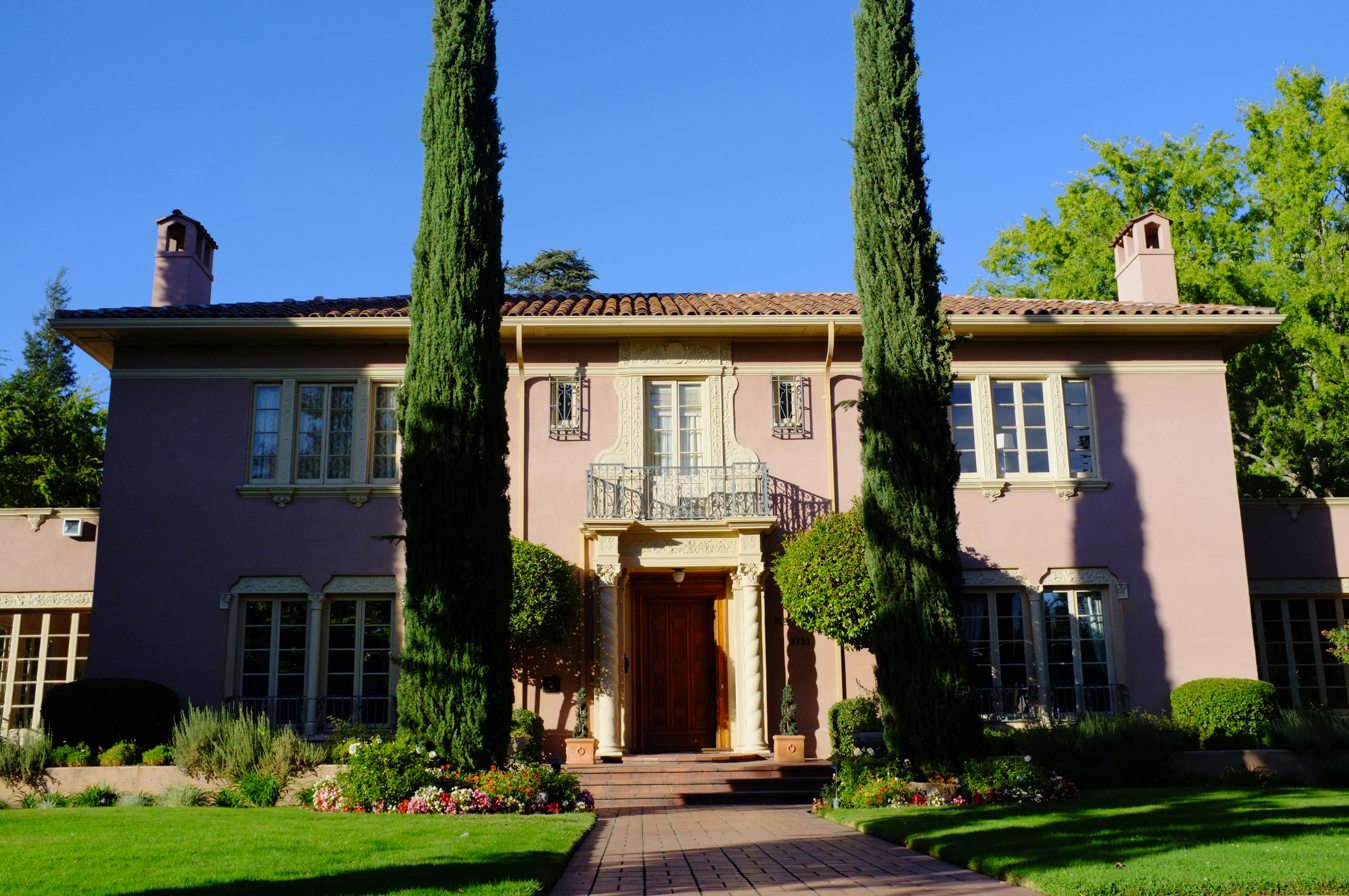

- Location within Sacramento, California Location within California Location within the United States
- Location: 3731 T St., Sacramento, California
- Coordinates: 38°33′33.40″N 121°27′37.62″W
- Area: 1 acre (0.40 ha)
- Built: 1924
- Architect: Julia Morgan
- Architectural style: Mediterranean Revival; late 19th- and 20th-century Revivals
- NRHP reference No.: 82002230
- Added to NRHP: February 19, 1982

The Julia Morgan House, also known as Goethe House, is a Mediterranean Revival mansion, located in the Elmhurst neighborhood of Sacramento, California, constructed by Julia Morgan, the first woman licensed to practice architecture in California. The home, now listed on the National Register of Historic Places, was gifted to Sacramento State University by Charles Goethe after his death in 1966.

== History ==
In 1918, Charles Goethe hired Julia Morgan to draw plans for the house. When Goethe died in 1966 he bequeathed the house along with his library, papers, and a large monetary donation to California State University, Sacramento. Since then, University Enterprises, Inc. has maintained it.

=== Recent history ===
In 1982 the house was added to the National Register of Historic Places due to its historic nature. Part of said historic nature is the fact that it is the only example of Morgan's domestic architecture in the Sacramento area. In 1999, the home was remodeled and its name was formally changed to the Julia Morgan House. In 2014, the house was remodeled to include business meeting and conference facilities. The house is currently used by the university to hold events by faculty or campus staff or can be rented for corporate and business meetings.

== See also ==
- List of works by Julia Morgan
- National Register of Historic Places listings in Sacramento County, California
