= Simon Koshland =

Kingdom of Bavaria-born American businessman and wool merchant

- Born: 1825; Ichenhausen, Kingdom of Bavaria
- Died: 1896 (aged 71)
- Resting place: Home of Peace Cemetery (Colma, California)
- Occupation: businessman
- Known for: co-founder of Koshland Brothers
- Spouse: Rosina Frauenthal
- Children: 9
- Family: Daniel E. Koshland Sr. (grandson); Daniel E. Koshland Jr. (great-grandson); Douglas Koshland (great-great grandson); John D. Goldman (great-great grandson); Douglas E. Goldman (great-great grandson); Abraham Haas (son-in-law)

Simon Koshland (1825–1896) was a Bavarian-born American businessman, and wool merchant. He is the patriarch of the Koshland and Haas family of San Francisco.

== Biography ==
Simon Koshland was born in Ichenhausen, Kingdom of Bavaria in 1825. In 1850, he immigrated to Sacramento via Panama with his older brother where they opened a general merchandise store. In 1862, he moved to San Francisco after his store was burned down in a flood where he and his brother opened a wool house named Koshland Brothers. The company eventually morphed into Koshland & Sons and became the leading wool house in America.

Koshland retired in the 1890s; his sons and sons-in-law continued the family business.

== Personal life ==
Koshland married Rosina Franenthal of Philadelphia; they had 8 children: Isidore, Joseph, Marcus, Henrietta, Caroline, Frances, Montefiore, Abraham, and Jesse. His daughter Frances married Abraham Haas, and his son Marcus had a son, Daniel E. Koshland Sr., who married Eleanor Haas, the daughter of Abraham Haas.

He was a member of Ohabai Shalome Congregation; and later Temple Emanu-El. He died in 1896, and is buried at Home of Peace Cemetery in Colma, California.

== Descendants ==
Some of Koshland's descendants include:

- Simon Koshland (1825–1896) m. Rosina Frauenthal (1829–1911)
  - Isidore Koshland (1852–1870)
  - Joseph Koshland (1855–1940)
  - Marcus Simon Koshland (1858–1925) m. Corrine M. Schweitzer (1867–1953)
    - Daniel E. Koshland Sr. (1892–1979) m. Eleanor Haas (1900–1959)
      - Daniel E. Koshland Jr. (1920–2007) m. Marian Elliott (1921–1997)
        - Ellen Koshland
        - Phyllis "Phylp" Koshland
        - James Koshland
        - Gail Koshland
        - Douglas Koshland (1953–) m. Mary Porter
      - Frances "Sissy" Koshland (1921–2019) m. Theodore H. Geballe (1920–2021)
        - Gordon Theodore Geballe
        - Alison Frances Geballe
        - Adam Phillip Geballe (1951–)
        - Monica Ruth Geballe
        - Jennifer Corinne Geballe
        - Ernest Henry Geballe
      - Phyllis Koshland Friedman (1923–2019) m. Howard A. Friedman (1919–1988)
  - Henrietta "Nettie" Koshland Sinsheimer (1860–1926)
  - Caroline "Carrie" Koshland Greenebaum (1863–1946)
  - Frances “Fannie” Koshland (1865–1949) m. Abraham Haas (1847–1921)
    - Charles Haas (c.1888–)
    - Walter A. Haas Sr. (1889–1979) m. Elise Stern (1893–1990)
      - Walter A. Haas Jr. (1916–1995) m. Evelyn Danzig (1917–2010)
        - Robert D. Haas (1942–)
        - Betsy Haas Eisenhardt m. Roy Eisenhardt (1939–)
        - Walter J. Haas
      - Peter E. Haas (1918–2005) m. Josephine Baum (1914–2014)
        - Peter E. Haas Jr. (1947–) m. Joanne Christensen; m. Ginnie Haas
          - Jennifer C. Haas
          - Daniel Haas
          - Bradley Haas
        - Margaret E. Haas Jones
        - Michael Stern Haas (1953–2003)
      - Rhoda Haas Goldman (1924–1996) m. Richard Goldman (1920–2010)
        - John D. Goldman (1949–) m. Marcia Koshland
          - Aaron Goldman (1980–)
          - Jessica Goldman Foung (1983–) m. Alejandro Foung
        - Douglas E. Goldman (1952–) m. Lisa Goldman
          - Jennifer Goldman
          - Jason Goldman
          - Matthew Goldman
        - Susan R. Gelman m. Michael Gelman
        - Richard W. Goldman (1947–1989) m. Susan Sachs
          - Daniel Sachs Goldman (1976–)
          - William "Bill" Sachs Goldman (1979–2017)
    - Ruth Haas Lilienthal (1891–1975) m. Philip Nettre Lilienthal Jr. (1889–1961)
    - Eleanor Haas Koshland (1900–1959) m. Daniel E. Koshland Sr. (1892–1979)
  - Montefiore T. Koshland (1867–1889)
  - Abraham Koshland (1869–1944) m. Estelle Wangenheim (1878–1960)
  - Jesse Koshland (1871–1966) m. Edith R. Guggenhime (1887–1977)
