= John D. Goldman =

American businessman and philanthropist

- Born: August 18, 1949 (age 76)
- Education: Swarthmore College (BA); Stanford University (MBA)
- Occupations: Philanthropist; Businessman
- Children: 2
- Parent(s): Rhoda Haas Goldman; Richard Goldman
- Family: Walter A. Haas (grandfather); Abraham Haas (great-grandfather); Simon Koshland (great great-grandfather); Douglas E. Goldman (brother); Susie Goldman Gelman (sister); Peter E. Haas (uncle); Walter A. Haas Jr. (uncle); Peter E. Haas Jr. (cousin)

John D. Goldman (born August 18, 1949) is an American businessman and philanthropist in San Francisco, California. He is a member of the Haas family through his mother.

== Biography ==
Goldman was born to a Jewish family on August 18, 1949, in San Francisco, the son of Rhoda (née Haas) and Richard Goldman. He is the 2nd eldest of four children: Richard Goldman (deceased 1989), Douglas E. Goldman, and Susan R. Gelman. His grandfather was Walter A. Haas, the former president and chairman of Levi Strauss & Co; his great-grandfather was Abraham Haas, the founder of Hellman-Haas Grocery (which became Smart & Final); and his great great-grandfather was Simon Koshland was then one of the largest wool merchants in the United States. He was raised in the Presidio Heights neighborhood of San Francisco. In 1967, he graduated from Lick-Wilmerding High School. He graduated with a B.A. from Swarthmore College and with a M.B.A. from Stanford University in 1975. After school, he served in the Office of the Legislative Analyst for California. In 1978, he accepted a position as the state's assistant secretary of transportation under governor Jerry Brown. In 1981, he purchased a chain of children's clothing stores named Jamboree but the business failed. In 1986, he joined the Richard N. Goldman and Company (later Goldman Insurance Services) which was founded by his father. In 1991, he became president and in 2002, the family sold the business. After his mother died in 1998, he served as a trustee of the Richard and Rhoda Goldman Fund.

== Philanthropy ==
In 2000, he was named chair of the Jewish Community Federation of San Francisco where he has served since 1987 (including as campaign chairman in 1991 and chairman of the Israel and overseas committee since 1998). Both his grandfather (1958–1959) and father (1980–1982) had served before him. In the 1990s, he served as president of the San Francisco-based Jewish Family and Children's Services. In 1990, he won Dinkelspiel Award for outstanding service by a young community leader. In 2001, he was appointed president of the San Francisco Symphony where he was succeeded by Sakurako Fisher (wife of William S. Fisher) in 2012. Goldman and his wife have established three separate charitable funds, the John and Marcia Goldman Foundation (with a focus on needy and disadvantaged youth in San Mateo and Santa Clara counties), the Serrano Foundation (a public fund), and the Jewish Community Endowment Fund (limited to Jewish agencies).

Goldman also serves on the Board of Managers of Swarthmore College, the Board of Governors of the Insurance Industry Charitable Fund (IICF), the Stanford University Athletic Board. He serves as a trustee of several of his family's foundations: the Walter and Elise Haas Fund, the Richard and Rhoda Goldman Fund, and the Goldman Environmental Foundation. He also serves on the board of the Wildlife Conservation Society; as a member of the President's Council of the Coyote Point Center for Environmental Education; on the board of Project Open Hand; and board member of the Trust for Public Land. He previously served as President of the Board of Jewish Family and Children's Services and is a former board member of the Institute on Aging of Mount Zion Health Systems. He has also served with United Jewish Appeal and AIPAC.

== Personal life ==
On May 29, 1977, he married Marcia Koshland who is also Jewish. They have two children: Aaron Goldman (born 1980) and Jessica Goldman Foung (born 1983). His wife is an autism educator and serves as director of education with the Pacific Autism Center For Education in San Jose. The couple are members of Congregation Emanu-El in San Francisco.
