= Home of Peace Cemetery (Colma, California) =

Jewish cemetery in San Mateo County, California

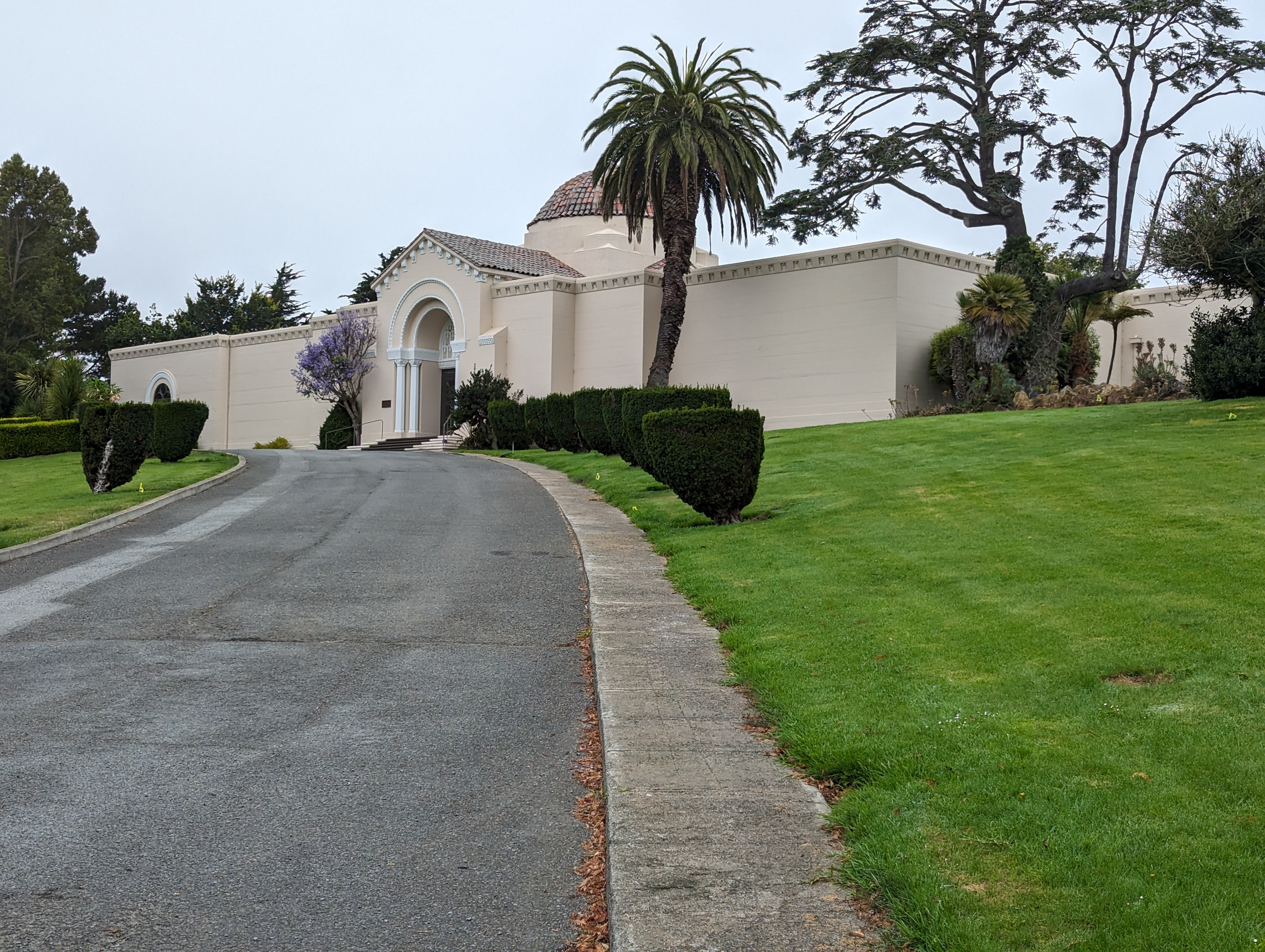
- Emanu-El Mausoleum at Home of Peace (completed 1935)

Details
- Established: 1889
- Location: Colma, California
- Country: United States
- Coordinates: 37.678113°N 122.453050°W
- Type: Jewish
- Owned by: Congregation Emanu-El
- Website: jcemsf.org/home-of-peace-cemetery/
- Find a Grave: Home of Peace Cemetery

Home of Peace Cemetery, also known as Navai Shalome, is a Jewish cemetery established in 1889, and is located at 1299 El Camino Real in Colma, California. The cemetery contains the Emanu-El Mausoleum, owned by and serving the Congregation Emanu-El of San Francisco. It is one of four Jewish cemeteries near the city of San Francisco and it shares an adjacent space next to the Hills of Eternity Memorial Park (also a Jewish cemetery, and also founded in 1889).

== History ==
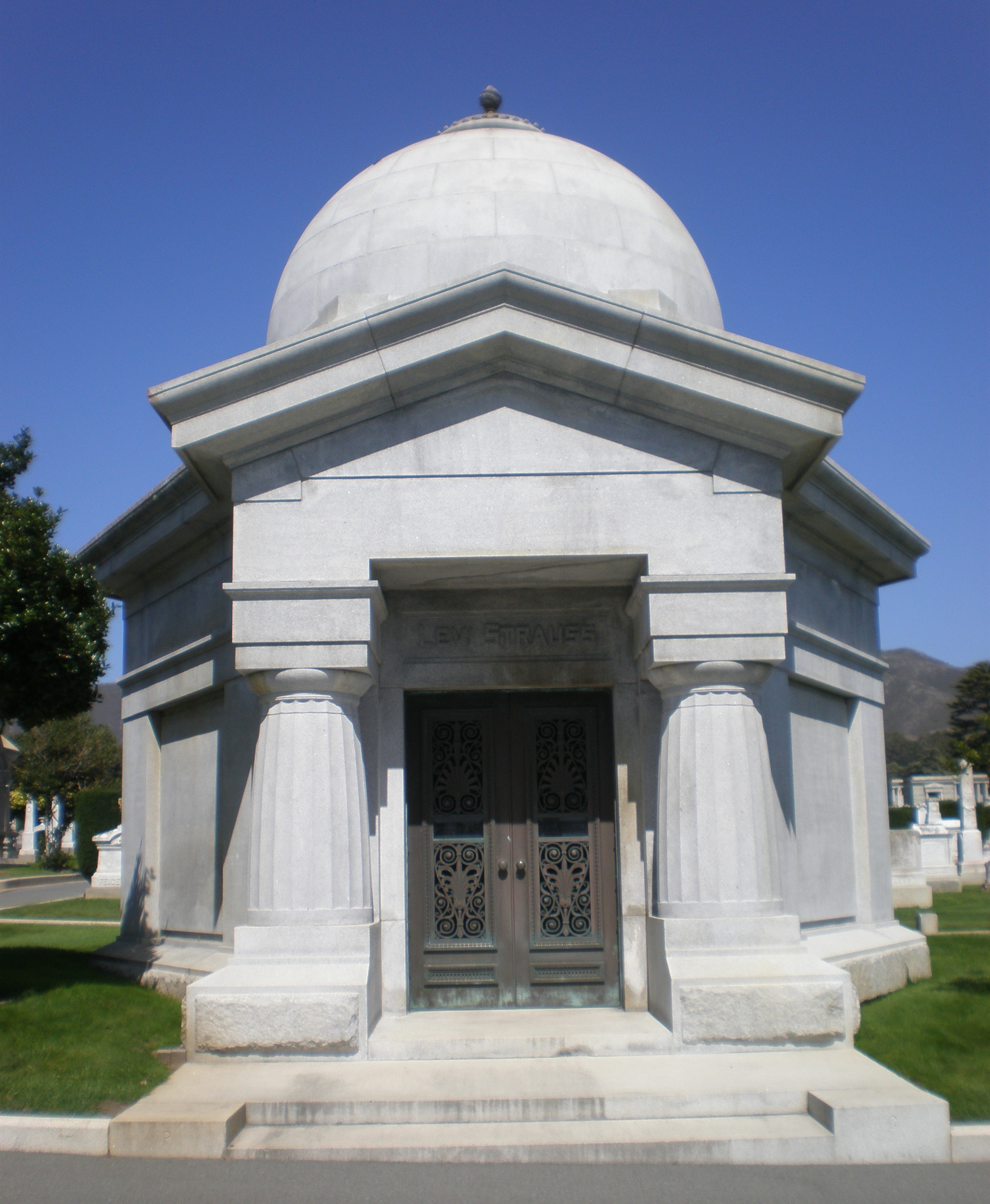
Levi Strauss mausoleum at the Home of Peace Cemetery

Emanu-El Hart (or the "Old Jewish Cemetery") was built in 1847 at Gough Street and Vallejo Street in San Francisco; by 1860 the remains were relocated to an area that is now Mission Dolores Park and this served as a cemetery for the Congregation Emanu-El and the Congregation Sherith Israel. When the city of San Francisco started to see dramatic growth in population; it was decided to move the cemetery outside of the city to Colma and they established Home of Peace Cemetery and Hills of Eternity Memorial Park with each cemetery serving a different congregation.

== Notable burials ==
- Aaron Fleishhacker (1820–1898), Kingdom of Bavaria-born American businessman; founded paper box manufacturer, A. Fleishhacker & Co.
- Herbert Fleishhacker (1872–1957), businessman, civic leader and philanthropist.
- Abraham Haas (1847–1921), Kingdom of Bavaria-born American businessman, co-founder of Hellman, Haas & Co.
- Alfred Hertz (1872–1942), Prussian-born conductor.
- Florence Prag Kahn (1866–1948), teacher, politician, and the first Jewish woman to serve in the United States Congress.
- Julius Kahn (1861–1924), Grand Duchy of Baden-born American politician, United States Congressman.
- Simon Koshland (1825–1896), Kingdom of Bavaria-born American businessman, and wool merchant.
- Charles Lane (1905–2007), actor, appearing in many Frank Capra films.
- Philip N. Lilienthal (1849–1908), banker and philanthropist; initially interred at the family vault at Home of Peace Cemetery and later moved to Salem Fields Cemetery, in Brooklyn, New York.
- Martin A. Meyer (1879–1923), rabbi
- Joseph Owades (1919–2005), biochemist and brewer of light and industrially produced beer.
- Ignatz Steinhart (1840–1917), banker, entrepreneur, philanthropist; namesake of the former Steinhart Aquarium in San Francisco.
- Levi Strauss (1829–1902), German Confederation-born American businessman; founder of Levi Strauss & Co. and the first blue jeans.
- Adolph Sutro (1830–1898), Prussian-born American engineer, politician and philanthropist; served as the 24th mayor of San Francisco from 1895 until 1897.
- Walter Wanger (1894–1968), film producer.
- James David Zellerbach (1892–1963), businessman, United States diplomat and ambassador.

== See also ==
- List of cemeteries in California
- Bereavement in Judaism
