= Dinkelspiel =

Dinkelspiel is a surname. Notable people with the surname include:

- Frances Dinkelspiel (born 1959), American journalist and author
- Lazarus Dinkelspiel (1824–1900), American businessman
- Moses Dinkelspiel (1855–1916), American politician
- Ulf Dinkelspiel (1939–2017), Swedish politician and financier
