= Susie Gelman =

Israel Policy Forum

Susan Ruth Gelman
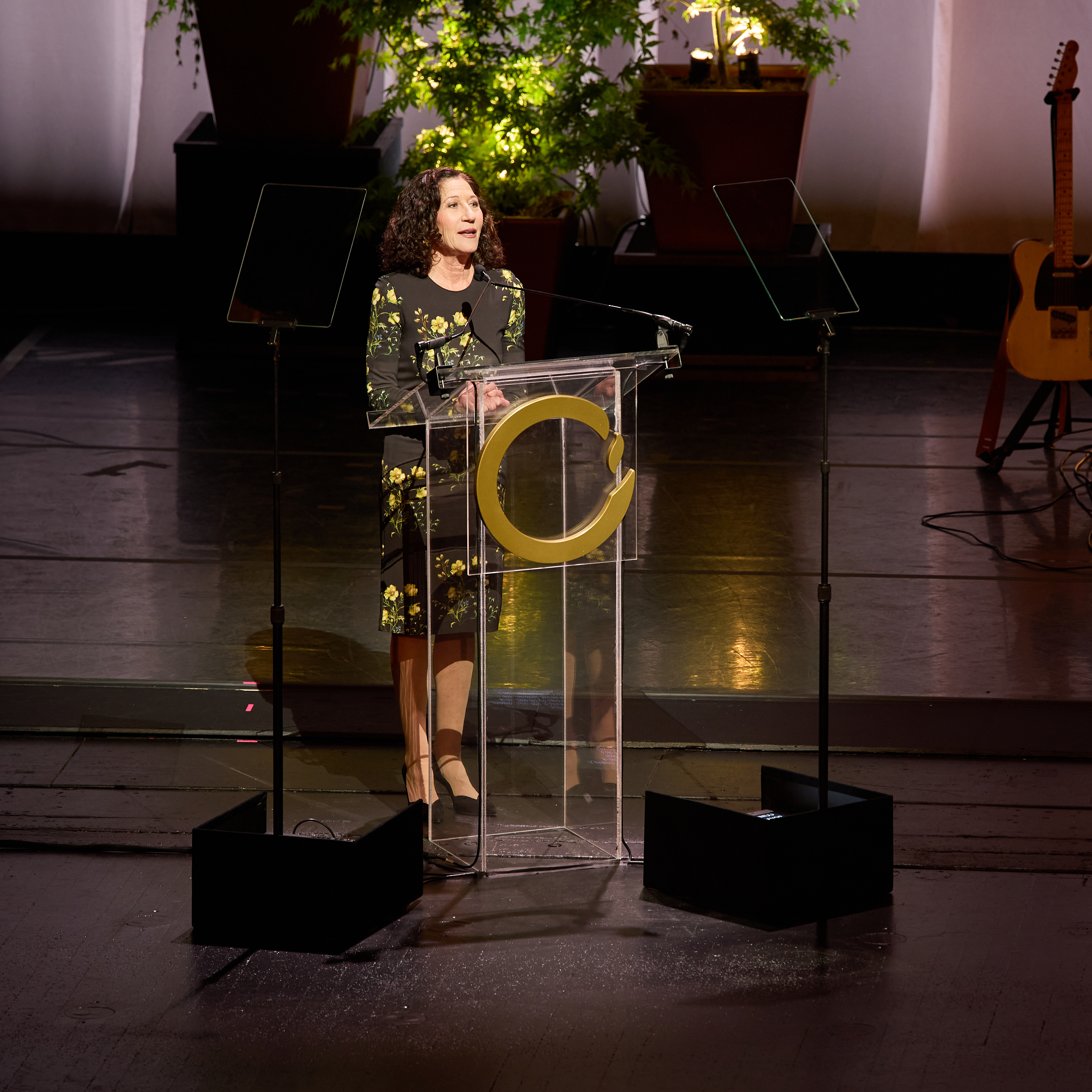
- Gelman at the 2024 Goldman Environmental Prize award ceremony
- Born: Susan Goldman; San Francisco, California, US
- Education: Harvard University (BA); Georgetown University (JD)
- Occupation: Chairwoman of the Israel Policy Forum
- Parent(s): Rhoda Haas Goldman; Richard Goldman
- Family: John D. Goldman (brother); Douglas E. Goldman (brother); Walter A. Haas (grandfather); Abraham Haas (great-grandfather); David Stern (great-grandfather)

Susie Gelman is an American activist and philanthropist who is the chairwoman of the Israel Policy Forum.

== Biography ==
Gelman was born Susan Goldman the daughter of Rhoda (née Haas) and Richard Goldman. She has three brothers: John D. Goldman, Douglas E. Goldman, and Richard W. Goldman (deceased). Her grandfather was Walter A. Haas, president and owner of Levi Strauss & Co. She is a graduate of Harvard University and the Georgetown University Law Center. She served for three terms as president of the Jewish Federation of Greater Washington and is a lifetime member of its board of directors. Gelman co-chaired the Israel Religious Expressions Platform of the Jewish Federations of North America which promotes freedom of choice of marriage in Israel. She has also served as the inaugural chair and ongoing board member of the Birthright Israel Foundation; on the Taglit-Birthright Israel Planning Committee; co-chair of United Jewish Communities (now Jewish Federations of North America) Israel; and co-chaired the Jewish Federations of North America’s General Assembly in Jerusalem in 2003 and 2013. In 2016, she was named chairman of the board for the Israel Policy Forum, a New York, NY based American Jewish organization that works for a negotiated two-state solution to the Israeli–Palestinian conflict though advocacy, education and policy research. Gelman is a member of the Board of Governors of The Hebrew University; was awarded an honorary fellowship at Brandeis University; served for 12 years on the Georgetown Day School Board of Trustees, including two years as president of the board; serves as president of the board of the Goldman Environmental Foundation; and served on the Board of Managers of Adas Israel Congregation. In 2012, the Richard and Rhoda Goldman Fund closed down and distributed its $280 million in assets to the three siblings. Susie and her husband channel their charitable activities through the Morningstar Foundation.

She believes that Israeli annexation of the West Bank is possible and would have terrible consequences for Israel threatening its legitimacy as a Jewish and democratic state.

== Personal life ==
She is married to Michael Gelman. Together they have three children, a son and two daughters. In May, 2024 it was revealed that her daughter Rachel Gelman, through her Bafrayung Fund, is a major sponsor of pro-Palestinian activist groups involved in campus demonstrations and adjacent actions.

Michael Gelman was founding partner of the accounting firm Gelman, Rosenberg & Freedman. She met her husband while they were in UJA's (now JFNA) Young Leadership program and were engaged at Kibbutz Ayelet Hashachar during a Federation mission to Israel.
