= Daniel E. Koshland =

Daniel E. Koshland may refer to:

- Daniel E. Koshland Jr. (1920–2007), American scientist
- Daniel E. Koshland Sr. (1892–1979), American businessman
