= Peter E. Haas =

American businessman

- Born: December 20, 1918; San Francisco, California, US
- Died: December 3, 2005 (aged 86)
- Other names: Pete Haas
- Education: University of California, Berkeley (BA); Harvard University (MBA)
- Occupation: Businessman
- Known for: President and CEO, Levi Strauss & Co
- Spouse(s): Josephine Baum (divorced) Miriam "Mimi" Lurie (m. 1981)
- Children: with Baum: --Peter E. Haas Jr. --Margaret E. Haas --Michael Stern Haas (deceased) step-children: --Ari Lurie --Daniel Lurie
- Parent(s): Elise Stern; Walter A. Haas
- Family: Rhoda Haas Goldman (sister); Walter A. Haas Jr. (brother); Simon Koshland (great-grandfather)

Peter E. Haas Sr. (December 20, 1918 – December 3, 2005) was an American billionaire businessman who was the executive vice president (1958–1970), president (1970–1981) and CEO (1976–1981), and chairman (1981–1989) of Levi Strauss & Co.

== Biography ==
Haas was born to a Jewish family in San Francisco, one of three children of Walter A. Haas and Elise Stern. Haas was the great-grandnephew of Levi Strauss, the founder of denim manufacturer Levi Strauss & Co. and great-grandson of David Stern. He attended the Deerfield Academy preparatory school in Massachusetts. In 1940, he graduated from University of California, Berkeley with a bachelor's degree in economics. After school, he went to work for an advertising agency in San Francisco. He was rejected by the military because of poor eyesight. In 1943, he graduated cum laude as a Baker Scholar from the Harvard Graduate School of Business Administration and then worked as a welder until the end of World War II. After the war, he went to work for the family company, Levi Strauss & Co, with his older brother, Walter A. Haas Jr. Under his tenure, the Levi Strauss Company became one of the first American clothing companies to racially integrate its workforce in the South prior to the U.S. civil rights movement. Haas was president and member of the board of directors from 1970 to 1981. In 1976, he became president and chief executive officer, and from 1981 until 1989, he was chairman of the board. From 1989 until his death, he was chairman of the company's executive committee.

From 1966 to 1975 and from 1994 to 1997, he was a trustee for the UC Berkeley Foundation. Due to the fact that his son Michael was developmentally disabled, Haas was a strong supporter of San Francisco Aid for Retarded Children. Haas was president of the Jewish Welfare Federation (later known as the Jewish Community Federation), which his grandfather, Abraham Haas, had helped to organize, from 1976 to 1978.

== Personal life ==
Haas was married twice. He had three children with his first wife, Kaw City, Oklahoma native Josephine Baum: Peter E. Haas Jr., Margaret E. Haas (adopted), and Michael Stern Haas (predeceased). His son Peter worked for the Levi Strauss Company in various capacities and was married to Joanne Christensen. Haas also has two stepsons with his second wife, Miriam "Mimi" Lurie: Ari Lurie and Daniel Lurie. Haas died in 2005. A memorial service was held at Temple Emanu-El in San Francisco. He passed his interest in Levi Strauss to his wife and children.

== Awards and honors ==
- 1996 – Golden Plate Award of the American Academy of Achievement
- 1996 – Berkeley Medal, the school's top honor, and also named the "Alumnus of the Year"
- 2001 – The Haas School of Business named Haas "Business Leader of the Year" and honored him with a special Lifetime Achievement Award
