= Mimi Haas =

American businesswoman and philanthropist

Miriam L. "Mimi" Haas
- Born: Miriam Ruchwarger; 1946 (age 79–80); New Jersey, U.S.
- Education: George Washington University (BA)
- Occupation: Businesswoman
- Board member of: Levi Strauss & Co.
- Spouses: Brian Lurie (m. 1968) Peter E. Haas (m. 1981; died 2005)
- Children: 2, including Daniel Lurie
- Relatives: Peter E. Haas Jr. (stepson)

Miriam "Mimi" Lurie Haas (born 1946) is an American billionaire businesswoman. She is the widow of Peter E. Haas, who was the great-grandnephew of Levi Strauss, the founder of denim manufacturer Levi Strauss & Co.

== Early life ==
She was born Miriam Ruchwarger in 1946 in New Jersey, the daughter of Nancy (née Zdenka) and Avram Ruchwarger, Jewish refugees from Yugoslavia. She was raised in Annapolis, Maryland and then in the Washington D.C. suburbs where her father was a psychiatrist. She attended Oxon Hill High School, in Oxon Hill, a suburb of Washington, D.C., and graduated in the class of 1964. She earned a degree in political science from George Washington University.

== Career ==
Haas is president of the Miriam and Peter Haas Fund, since August 1981.

In July 2004, Haas was elected as a director of Levi Strauss & Co, succeeding her husband, who stood down as chairman emeritus.

Haas is vice chair of the board of trustees and chair of the committee on painting and sculpture of the Museum of Modern Art, and vice chair of the San Francisco Museum of Modern Art.

In 2019, Haas owned nearly 17% of Levi Strauss & Co, making her a billionaire, following the February 2019 plan for the company to be publicly traded on the New York Stock Exchange. As of 2024, she owned 11%. In 2021, Forbes estimated her net worth to be around $1.4 billion.

== Personal life ==
On June 12, 1968, she married Brian Lurie, who she had met in Israel when on an American Friends of the Hebrew University program. Rabbi Brian Lurie was president of the Jewish Community Federation of San Francisco for many years. He is a past board president and serves on the board of directors of the New Israel Fund. They had two sons, Ari Lurie and Daniel Lurie, mayor of San Francisco and former CEO of Tipping Point Community.

She was married to Peter E. Haas (his second marriage) from 1981 until his death in 2005.

She lives in San Francisco.

In 2010, she bought one of the apartments owned by Charles R. Schwab at 834 Fifth Avenue, New York, for $12.5 million.

Around 2024, she donated $1 million to a committee supporting the candidacy of her son Daniel Lurie for mayor of San Francisco. A report by The San Francisco Standard concluded that this was possibly "the largest contribution to a committee in support or opposition of a candidate in San Francisco history."
