= Dan Goldman =

American politician and attorney (born 1976)

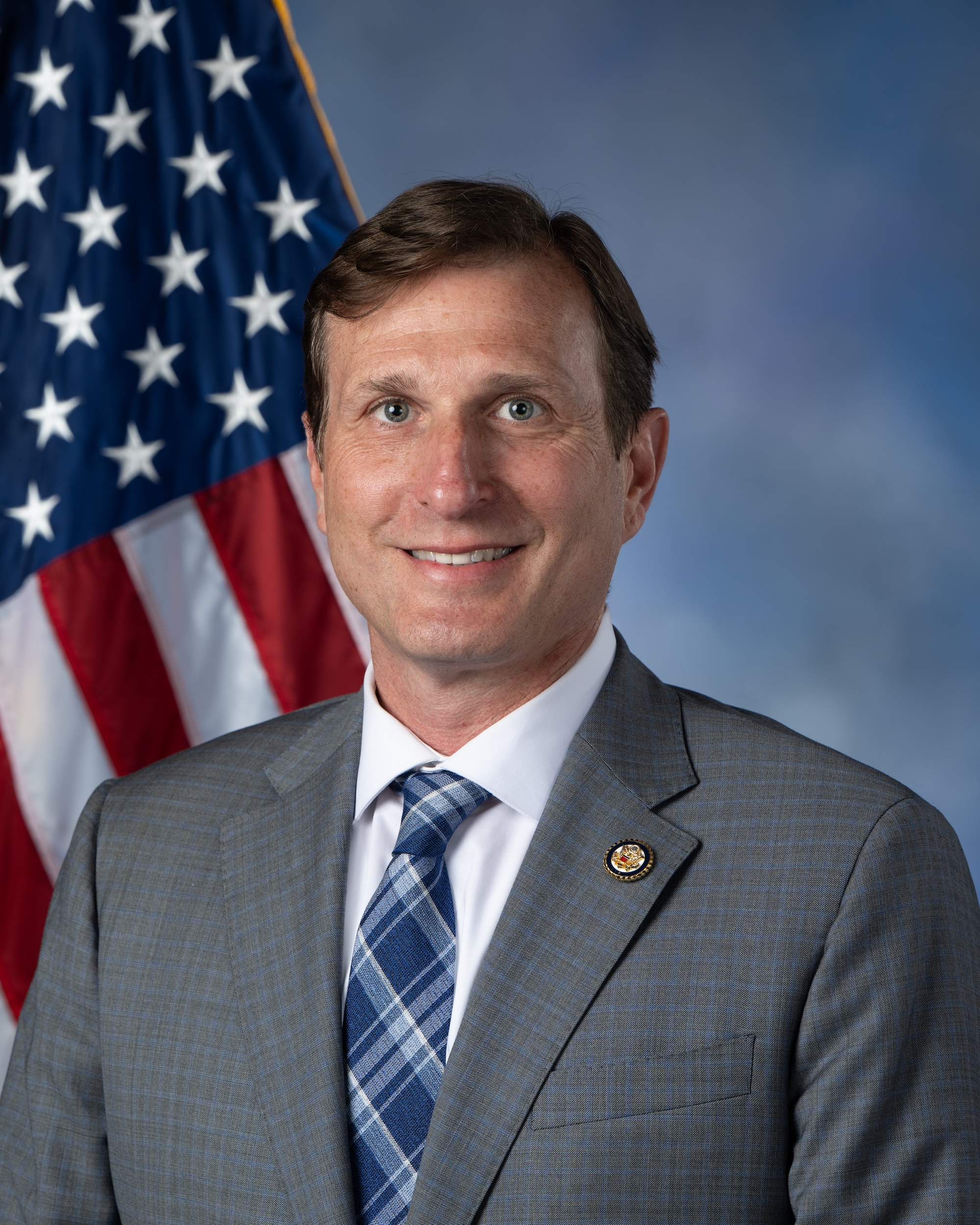
- Official portrait, 2025

Member of the U.S. House of Representatives from New York's 10th district
- Incumbent
- Assumed office January 3, 2023
- Preceded by: Jerry Nadler (redistricted)

Personal details
- Born: Daniel Sachs Goldman; February 26, 1976 (age 50) Washington, D.C., U.S.
- Party: Democratic
- Spouse(s): Anne Montminy (m. 2002; div. 2008) Corinne Levy (m. 2013)
- Children: 5
- Relatives: Rhoda Haas Goldman (grandmother); Richard Goldman (grandfather); Walter A. Haas (great-grandfather)
- Education: Yale University (BA); Stanford University (JD)
- Website: House website Campaign website
- Goldman's voice Goldman on a House resolution to expel Rep. George Santos. Recorded November 1, 2023

Daniel Sachs Goldman (born February 26, 1976) is an American politician and lawyer serving as the U.S. representative for New York's 10th congressional district since 2023. He is a member of the Democratic Party.

Goldman was first elected to Congress in 2022. In 2019, he served as lead majority counsel in the first impeachment inquiry against Donald Trump, and lead counsel to House Managers in Trump's impeachment trial. He was reelected in 2024. In 2026, Goldman lost re-nomination in the Democratic primary to former New York City Comptroller Brad Lander.

== Early life and family ==
Goldman was born in Washington, D.C., to Susan (née Sachs) and Richard W. Goldman. His father was a federal prosecutor in Washington, D.C., who died when Goldman was a child. His paternal grandparents were Rhoda Haas Goldman and Richard Goldman; his great-grandfather was Walter A. Haas, president of Levi Strauss & Co. His great-great-grandfather was Abraham Haas, the founder of the Smart & Final chain of food stores.

Goldman grew up in a Conservative Jewish family with his sister Alice and younger brother Bill, who died at age 38 in a plane crash in Sonoma, California. Daniel is an heir to the Levi Strauss & Co. fortune and is the first cousin once removed of San Francisco mayor Daniel Lurie, another member of the Levi Strauss family.

Goldman attended Sidwell Friends School in Washington D.C, where his mother previously served as chair of the board. He graduated with a Bachelor of Arts degree in history from Yale University in 1998 and a Juris Doctor degree with distinction from Stanford Law School in 2005. Before law school, he was a researcher and writer for NBC Sports.

== Early career ==
=== Federal prosecutor and legal analyst ===
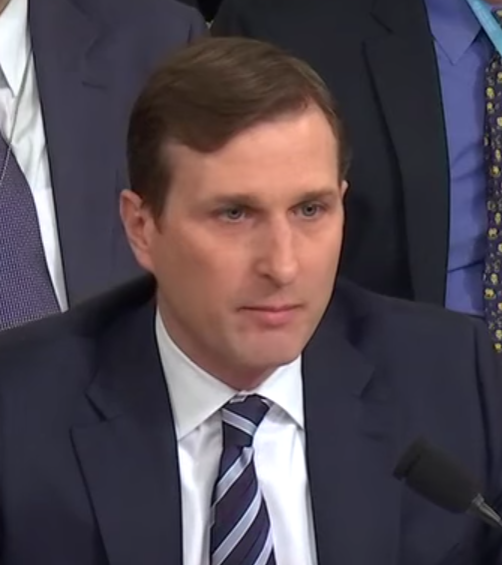
Goldman testifying before the House Judiciary Committee in 2019 regarding articles of impeachment against Donald Trump

After graduating from law school, Goldman clerked for Charles Breyer of the U.S. District Court for the Northern District of California and Robert D. Sack of the U.S. Court of Appeals for the Second Circuit. From 2007 to 2017, Goldman was an assistant United States attorney in the Southern District of New York under Preet Bharara. He prosecuted Russian organized crime, Genovese crime family mobsters, including Fotios Geas, who murdered Whitey Bulger while in prison, and a variety of white-collar crime and securities fraud. In 2017, Goldman was the lead prosecutor of Billy Walters, a sports bettor who was convicted for insider trading. After leaving the Southern District, Goldman became a legal analyst for NBC News and MSNBC and a fellow at the Brennan Center for Justice in New York.

Goldman was hired as Senior Advisor and Director of Investigations for the House Intelligence Committee in February 2019 and later became the lead counsel for the first impeachment inquiry against Donald Trump. He questioned witnesses on behalf of the majority during the House Intelligence Committee's public hearings. On December 9, 2019, he provided testimony at the public hearing of the House Judiciary Committee.

On November 16, 2021, Goldman announced his candidacy for the Democratic nomination for attorney general of New York in the 2022 election. When incumbent Letitia James ended her campaign for governor in December and opted to run for reelection, Goldman withdrew and endorsed James.

== U.S. House of Representatives ==
=== Election ===
==== 2022 ====
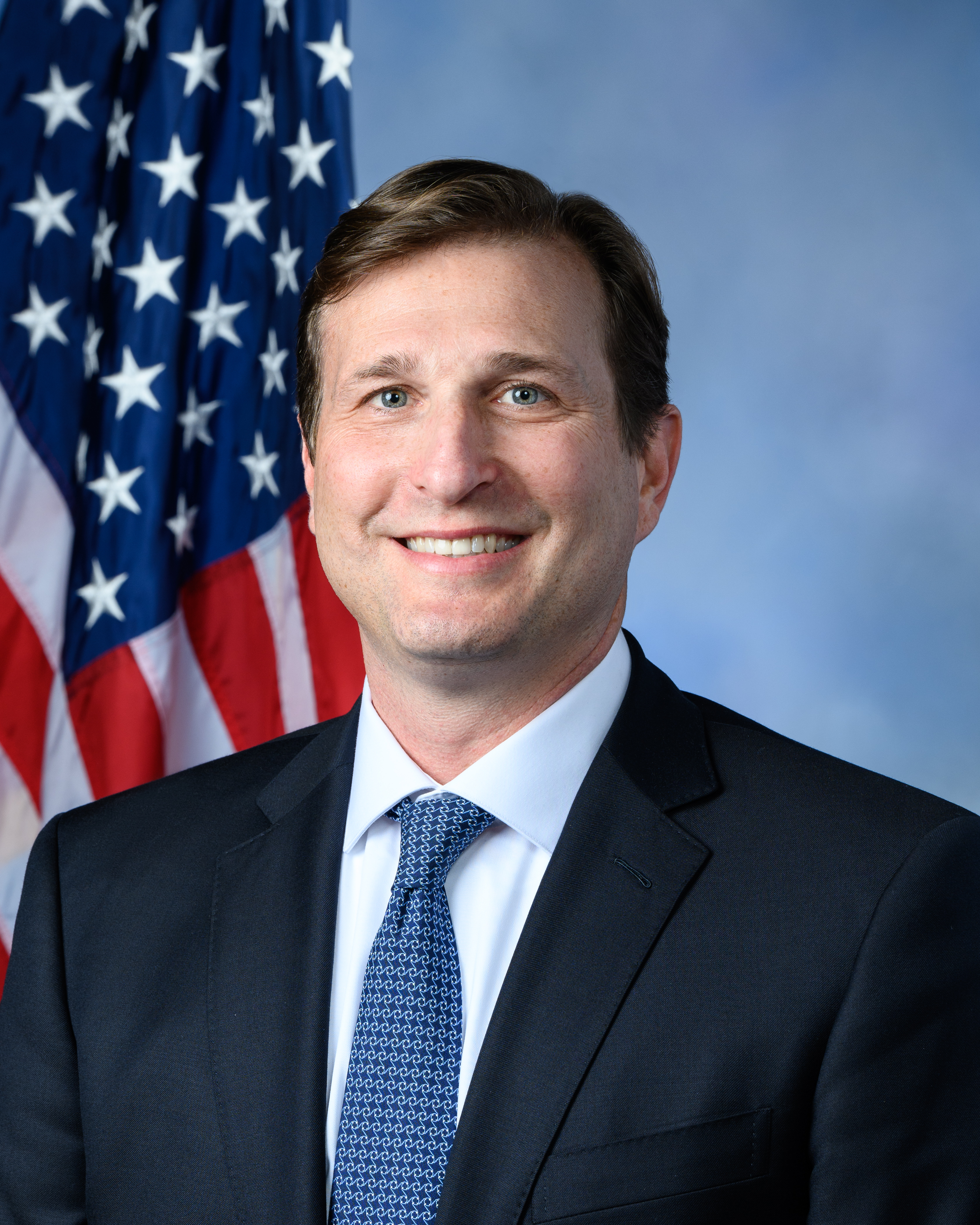
Goldman during the 118th Congress

2022 Democratic primary results (Interactive map version)

On June 1, 2022, Goldman announced his candidacy for United States Congress in New York's 10th district. A July 14 poll by Data for Progress indicated Goldman had 12% of support, behind Councilwoman Carlina Rivera's 17% and Assemblywoman Yuh-Line Niou's 14% in the crowded Democratic primary, which also included incumbent congressman Mondaire Jones and former congresswoman Elizabeth Holtzman. An internal poll conducted between July 22 and 26 showed Goldman leading the race with 18% of support, followed by Niou with 16% and Rivera with 14%. Goldman has been endorsed by New York state assemblymember Robert Carroll and Brian A. Cunningham, former U.S. representative Steve Israel, former lieutenant governor of New York Richard Ravitch and The New York Times. He received a backhanded endorsement from Donald Trump, who called him "very compassionate and compromising to those within the Republican Party", which Goldman's campaign rejected as a "pathetic attempt at fooling Democrats".

Goldman raised more than $1.2 million from more than 2,100 individual contributions in the month after he declared his candidacy. He received the maximum allowable campaign contributions from billionaire real estate developers Douglas Durst and Stephen M. Ross. Ross was also a major fundraiser and supporter of Trump. As of August 17, 2022, Goldman had contributed more than $4 million to his own campaign, leading rivals to accuse him of attempting to "purchase this congressional seat". His campaign hired a Republican campaign consultant who supported Trump in the 2020 presidential election and called Representative Maxine Waters "retarded" over her support for Trump's impeachment to perform voter outreach to Orthodox Jewish voters in Borough Park, Brooklyn. Goldman's campaign immediately fired the consultant and clarified that they were "unaware of these grossly offensive remarks" when City & State contacted them for comment.

Goldman's financial disclosures at the time indicated he had a line of credit from Goldman Sachs worth up to $50 million in addition to investments in weapons manufacturer Sturm, Ruger & Co., defense contractors Lockheed Martin and Northrop Grumman, oil companies Chevron, ExxonMobil and Halliburton, and Rupert Murdoch's Fox Corporation and News Corp. Goldman's campaign said he would put his assets into a blind trust if elected and that he was no longer invested in Sturm, Ruger & Co. He narrowly won the Democratic nomination in the crowded primary, receiving 16,686 votes (25.8%). He won the general election against Republican nominee Benine Hamdan with 83.9% of the vote.

==== 2024 ====
2024 Democratic primary results Goldman: 30–40%; 40–50%; 50–60%; 60–70%; 70–80%; 80–90%; 90–100%; Hutchison: 30–40%; 40–50%; 50–60%; 60–70%; 80–90%; No votes

Goldman ran for reelection in 2024. He won renomination in the Democratic primary with 66.1% of the vote against Evan Hutchison and Bruno Grandsard.

He was reelected in the general election against Republican Alex Dodenhoff with 82.3% of the vote.

==== 2026 ====
2026 Democratic primary results Lander: 50–60%; 60–70%; 70–80%; 80–90%; 90–100%; 100%; Goldman: 50–60%; 60–70%; 70–80%; 80–90%; 90–100%; 100%

After Zohran Mamdani won the 2025 Democratic primary for mayor, a poll suggested that Goldman might be vulnerable to a challenge from the left. Brooklyn City Council Member Alexa Avilés explored a run and was endorsed by the NYC Democratic Socialists of America. Former Assemblywoman Yuh-Line Niou also explored a run and attended an endorsement forum with the New York Working Families Party (WFP) along with Avilés, Goldman, and Comptroller Brad Lander. On December 10, 2025, Lander announced his candidacy. In the aftermath of Lander's announcement, Niou and Avilés both announced that they would not run and endorsed Lander, clearing the field for him.

In January 2026, New York Supreme Court Justice Jeffery Pearlman ruled that New York's 11th Congressional District, the sole New York City congressional district held by a Republican, which covers Staten Island and parts of South Brooklyn, violated the state's Voting Rights Act (VRA), and ordered it redrawn. Nicole Malliotakis, the Republican representative from 11th district, challenged the ruling and appealed to New York State's Appellate Court, Court of Appeals, and the United States Supreme Court.

It was widely believed that a redrawn 11th district would connect Staten Island with Lower Manhattan, which would have placed Goldman in a more moderate-friendly district and pitted him against Malliotakis in a general election. Subsequently, a redrawn 10th district would have shifted to represent more of South Brooklyn as well as parts of Manhattan's Chinatown, where Lander would likely have won the primary and general elections. Because of the uncertainty surrounding the congressional maps, Lander had engaged in what he called a "holds-barred" approach to Goldman, as he maintained that, as much as he disliked Goldman, he disliked Malliotakis more and would support Goldman over her if the redraw took place.

In February 2026, the State's Appellate court unanimously upheld Pearlman's ruling and ordered the maps redrawn. Since its ruling was unanimous, Malliotakis's appeal was ineligible to automatically be heard in the State's top court, the Court of Appeals. But in March 2026, the United States Supreme Court ruled 6–3 in Malliotakis's favor, effectively halting the redrawing of the eleventh district, saving Malliotakis from a contentious general election, and sealing Goldman and Lander as opponents in the 2026 primary for the tenth district.

On June 23, Lander defeated Goldman in a landslide in the Democratic primary for the 10th district. Goldman retained the support of House leadership, governor Kathy Hochul, and labor, but Lander was endorsed by New York City Mayor Zohran Mamdani, U.S. Senators Bernie Sanders and Elizabeth Warren, and many local elected officials. Lander criticized Goldman's position on the Gaza war and his refusal to call it a genocide, as well as his relationship with AIPAC, the pro-Israel lobbying organization that also backs conservative Republicans.

=== Tenure ===
On January 10, 2023, Goldman and Representative Ritchie Torres delivered an ethics complaint to the office of Representative George Santos, who was embattled by revelations that he lied about most of his résumé and background. Among the bills Goldman introduced in his first year in Congress: the Early Voting Act, the African Burial Ground International Memorial Museum and Educational Center Act, the Strengthening Medicaid for Serious Mental Illness Act, the Immigration Court Efficiency and Children's Court Act of 2023, the Disarming Cartels Act, the Codifying SAVE Plan Act, and the GRADUATE Act.

Goldman is a member of the Vote Blue Coalition, a progressive group and federal PAC created to support Democrats in New York, New Jersey, and Pennsylvania through voter outreach and mobilization efforts. In 2025, he was among several New York Democrats who did not endorse Zohran Mamdani for mayor.

=== Committee assignments (119th Congress) ===
- Committee on Judiciary
  - Subcommittee on Crime and Federal Government Surveillance
  - Subcommittee on The Constitution and Limited Government
- Committee on Homeland Security
  - Subcommittee on Counterterrorism, Law Enforcement, and Intelligence

=== Caucus memberships ===
- Congressional Progressive Caucus
- New Democrat Coalition
- Dads Caucus
- Voting Rights Caucus
- Congressional Equality Caucus
- Future Forum
- Pro Choice Caucus
- Congressional Asian Pacific American Caucus
- Labor Caucus
- Renters Caucus
- Quiet Skies Caucus
- Congressional Ukraine Caucus
- Baltic Caucus
- Public Broadcasting Caucus
- Sustainable Energy and Environment Coalition

== Political positions ==
=== Abortion ===
Goldman has said he believes abortion is a health-care decision that "should be made between an individual and their doctor". He drew significant backlash and criticism when he revealed support for abortion restrictions, and said he would not object to a state law barring abortion after a fetus is considered viable. He said in the same interview that his personal views on abortion are secondary to the right of a woman to choose.

In June 2023, Goldman and Congresswoman Judy Chu led more than 50 lawmakers in pressing Walmart, Costco, Kroger, and other major American pharmacies to sell the abortion pill, mifepristone. In July, Goldman called the Supreme Court decision Dobbs v. Jackson Women's Health Organization, which overturned Roe v. Wade, "one of the very worst opinions that the Supreme Court has ever issued on both a legal and factual basis".

=== Democracy ===
Goldman accused the President Donald Trump of "inflammatory rhetoric", and stated that Trump is "destructive to democracy" and "has to be eliminated". After backlash from conservatives, Goldman said "eliminate" was a wrong term: "Yesterday on TV, I mistakenly used the wrong word to express the importance for America that Donald Trump doesn't become President again".

=== Economic issues ===
Goldman supports increasing the national minimum wage, universal child care, and paid family leave. He supports promoting business development, and requiring corporations to pay their fair share to "increase opportunity for all Americans". He also supports the PRO Act.

Goldman was one of the 46 Democrats who voted against final passage of the Fiscal Responsibility Act of 2023 in the House.

=== Environment ===
Goldman said in his 2022 campaign that he supports the principles and goals of a Green New Deal to transition to clean energy and has called climate change an "existential threat". He supports public–private partnerships to incentivize private companies to invest in renewable energy.

=== Foreign policy ===
Goldman said that Russia's invasion of Ukraine threatens Ukraine's sovereignty, international order, and democracy globally. He is in favor of U.S. aid to Ukraine and sanctions on Russia.

In 2023, Goldman voted against H.Con.Res. 21, which directed President Joe Biden to remove U.S. troops from Syria within 180 days.

Goldman supports democracy in Taiwan, but opposed Speaker Nancy Pelosi's August 2022 visit to Taiwan and concurred with the Biden administration's assessment of the risks, citing intelligence and diplomatic concerns.

==== Israeli–Palestinian conflict ====
Goldman has been called a "progressive except for Palestine", a label he has rejected. In 2026, he said, "I think I have a very progressive approach to Israel, and to my support for the U.S.-Israel relationship." Goldman has said he supports a two-state solution to the Israeli–Palestinian conflict. He has been endorsed by the pro-Israel lobby groups AIPAC and J Street. He opposes the Boycott, Divestment and Sanctions movement, calling it a "thinly-veiled demonstration of antisemitism".

Goldman voted to support Israel after the October 7 attacks. That month, he shared a post by Arsen Ostrovsky that falsely claimed a photo of a dead Gazan child actually depicted a doll. In November 2023, Goldman voted to censure Representative Rashida Tlaib for her use of the phrase "from the river to the sea". In 2024, he signed an open letter expressing "disgust" at South Africa's case at the International Court of Justice charging Israel with intent to commit genocide in Gaza. He has refused to call Israel's actions in Gaza a genocide, and does not support the Block the Bombs Act.

In 2025, Goldman did not endorse Democratic nominee for Mayor of New York Zohran Mamdani or any of his opponents. Goldman said Mamdani never "fully got there" in regard to denouncing antisemitism.

In 2026, Goldman lost the Democratic primary for his Congressional seat to Brad Lander, with his positions on Palestine and Israel a key theme in the election campaign.

=== Healthcare ===
During his 2022 campaign, Goldman said that he believes healthcare is a fundamental right and supported a public option in addition to private health insurance, while opposing Medicare for All. Later in 2023, he co-sponsored the Medicare for All Act in Congress.

=== Housing ===
Goldman supports "public–private partnerships" to combat New York City's lack of affordable housing. He supports construction by private real estate developers, fully funding NYCHA, and allocating federal dollars for private firms to update and manage properties NYCHA owns.

=== Judiciary ===
Goldman opposes expanding the Supreme Court of the United States. During a candidate forum, in August 2022, he was asked by then representative for New York's 17th congressional district Mondaire Jones why, after saying that the American democracy is in a "five-alarm fire", he opposes the expansion of the Supreme Court, and Goldman responded that "packing the court" would be "antidemocratic." Later the same month, he expressed, in an interview with New York Magazine, his support for implementing term limits on Supreme Court justices.

=== LGBTQ rights ===
Goldman supports passing the Equality Act to prohibit discrimination on the basis of sex, sexual orientation, and gender identity. In response to a questionnaire from the Jim Owles Liberal Democratic Club, he said he had never, until 2022, marched in an LGBTQ Pride parade because his work as a federal prosecutor prevented him from doing so. The response drew criticism as well as accusations of using the LGBTQ community as a "political football," after it was revealed that it contradicted the guidelines and restrictions issued by the Department of Justice, which states employees may "attend political rallies and meetings", while, moreover, the Department of Justice has with its own employee-run "DOJ Pride".

=== Security ===
In April 2025, in response to funding for the Mexico–United States border wall, Goldman said: "Would it be better if we had a border wall to keep the border safe? Probably. But is it really the most effective use of $46 billion? Of course not."

Goldman opposed a 2024 amendment to Section 702 of the Foreign Intelligence Surveillance Act that would explicitly require a warrant for state agencies to search foreign communications of citizens and permanent residents.

== Electoral history ==
=== 2022 ===
2022 New York's 10th congressional district Democratic primary
Party	Candidate	Votes	%
Democratic	Dan Goldman	16,686	25.8
Democratic	Yuh-Line Niou	15,380	23.7
Democratic	Mondaire Jones (Note: Due to redistricting, Mondaire Jones decided to move to NY-10, which is not connected by territory to his home district of NY-17.)	11,777	18.2
Democratic	Carlina Rivera	10,985	17.0
Democratic	Jo Anne Simon	3,991	6.2
Democratic	Elizabeth Holtzman	2,845	4.4
Democratic	Jimmy Li	777	1.2
Democratic	Yan Xiong	686	1.1
Democratic	Maud Maron	578	0.9
Democratic	Bill de Blasio (withdrawn)	477	0.7
Democratic	Brian Robinson	322	0.5
Democratic	Peter Gleason	147	0.2
Democratic	Quanda Francis	121	0.2
Total votes		64,772	100.0

2022 New York's 10th congressional district general election
Party	Candidate	Votes	%
Democratic	Dan Goldman	160,582	83.4
Republican	Benine Hamdan	26,711	13.8
Conservative	Benine Hamdan	2,347	1.2
Total	Benine Hamdan	29,058	15.1
Medical Freedom Party	Steve Speer	1,447	0.7
Write-in		1,260	0.6
Total votes		192,347	100.0

=== 2024 ===
2024 New York's 10th congressional district Democratic primary
Party	Candidate	Votes	%
Democratic	Dan Goldman (incumbent)	22,708	66.1
Democratic	Evan Hutchison	8,073	23.5
Democratic	Bruno Grandsard	3,599	10.5
Total votes		34,380	100.0

2024 New York's 10th congressional district general election
Party	Candidate	Votes	%
Democratic	Dan Goldman (incumbent)	206,206	81.0
Republican	Alexander Dodenhoff	37,555	14.8
Conservative	Paul Briscoe	6,747	2.7
Write-in		4,048	1.6
Total votes		254,556	100.0

=== 2026 ===
2026 New York's 10th congressional district Democratic primary
Party	Candidate	Votes	%
Democratic	Brad Lander	58,047	66.0
Democratic	Dan Goldman (incumbent)	29,781	33.8
Democratic	Write-in	165	0.2
Total votes		87,993	100.0

== Personal life ==
Goldman has married twice. In 2002, he married Olympic diver and lawyer Anne Montminy; she is from Montreal. They divorced in 2008, after having two children. In 2013, he married Corinne Goldman (née Levy); they have three children. Goldman and Corrine met at an AIPAC event in 2012.

Goldman is among the wealthiest members of Congress, with an estimated personal net worth of up to $253 million according to financial disclosure forms.

== See also ==
- List of Jewish members of the United States Congress
- Timeline of investigations into Trump and Russia (2019–2020)
- Steve Castor

== Notes ==
U.S. House of Representatives
Preceded by Jerry Nadler	Member of the U.S. House of Representatives from New York's 10th congressional district 2023–present	Incumbent
U.S. order of precedence (ceremonial)
Preceded by Marie Gluesenkamp Perez	United States representatives by seniority 312th	Succeeded by Harriet Hageman
