= Bush Street Temple =

Former synagogue now retirement home, in San Francisco, California, US

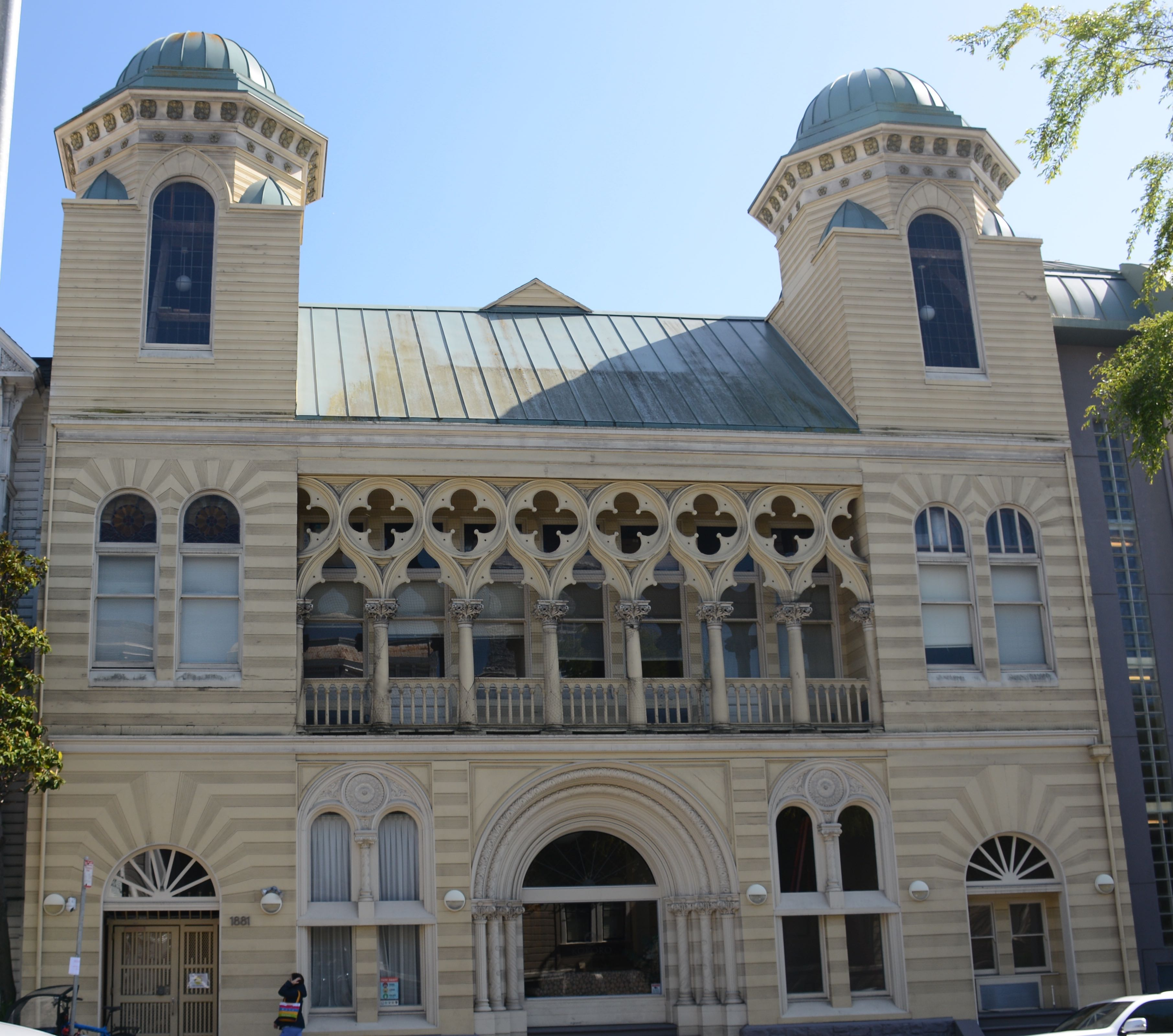
- The former synagogue building, in 2019

- Location of the former synagogue in central San Francisco

Religion
- Affiliation: Orthodox Judaism (1864–1934); Buddhism (1935–1972)
- Ecclesiastical or organizational status: Synagogue (1895–1934); Buddhist temple (1935–1972); Aged care residential (since 2003)
- Ownership: Japanese American Religious Federation
- Status: Closed (as a synagogue); Repurposed

Location
- Location: 1881 Bush Street, San Francisco, California
- Country: United States
- Interactive map of Bush Street Temple
- Coordinates: 37°47′15″N 122°25′41″W

Architecture
- Architect: Moses J. Lyon
- Type: Synagogue architecture
- Style: Moorish Revival; Venetian Gothic Revival
- Established: 1864 (as a congregation)
- Completed: 1895
- Materials: Redwood
- Bush Street Temple (Soto Mission)
- San Francisco Designated Landmark No. 81
- SFDL No.: 81
- Designated SFDL: April 18, 1976

The Bush Street Temple is a former Orthodox Jewish congregation and synagogue, and former Buddhist temple, located at 1881 Bush Street in San Francisco, California, in the United States. The building has also been used as a Baptist church, and, since 2003, was repurposed as an aged care residential facility. At various stages between 1936 and 1994, the building was occasionally used by the San Francisco Go Club. The building, completed in 1895, was listed as a San Francisco Designated Landmark on April 18, 1976.

== Building ==
The building was designed by designed by Moses J. Lyon in a Moorish Revival and Venetian Gothic Revival styles, completed in 1895. The arches across the front are copied from the Doge's Palace. The former synagogue building was extensively renovated in 2003, at which time it was joined to a new adjacent structure.

The building is constructed almost entirely of redwood. Originally, much of the interior was painted in trompe-l'œil to resemble marble. In its original configuration it featured a pair of elaborate towers, since lost.

== History ==
=== Congregation Ohabai Shalome ===
Congregation Ohabai Shalome (transliterated from Hebrew as "Lovers of Peace") was established in 1864 by a group of disaffected members of Congregation Emanu-El in San Francisco, who objected to the modification of the ritual in the older synagogue. The new congregation was popularly known as the Bush Street Synagogue. In the face of declining membership, the congregation sold the building in November 1934 to the Soto Zen Mission of the Sokoji Buddhist Church.

=== San Francisco Go Club ===
The San Francisco Go Club had become the first overseas branch of Japan's Nihon Ki-in in 1936 and in 1937 moved into the left wing of the building. The club remained, even after the building was otherwise abandoned, until forced out by redevelopment about 1994.

=== Sokoji Soto Zen Mission ===
During World War II, the owners and Japanese-American congregants of the Soto Zen Mission of the Sokoji Buddhist Church were interned in concentration camps, as part of the wartime Japanese American internment. During this time, while its Japanese-American owners continued to make mortgage payments on the building, 1881 Bush Street became the home of the Macedonia Missionary Baptist Church, a church whose congregants were primarily African-Americans from the American South. After the war, the Zen Mission took back ownership of the building.

In 1959 Shunryu Suzuki Roshi arrived at Sokoji to minister to the congregation. He initiated the regular practice of zazen, which was unusual at the time and soon began to attract western students. The San Francisco Zen Center was incorporated separately, comprising the western disciples of Suzuki Roshi, who continued to share the space throughout the 1960s with the Sokoji congregation. During this time the building was one of the central locations of the transmission of Zen Buddhism to the United States. In 1969 the Zen Center, in need of larger facilities, moved to Page Street. The Sokoji community also moved three years later in 1972, and the building thereafter stood empty and fell into disrepair, coming under the ownership of the San Francisco Redevelopment Agency.

== Abandonment and redevelopment ==
In the late 1980s, there were unsuccessful attempts to turn the building into a Jewish Cultural Center. In 1996 the ownership of the building was transferred to the Japanese American Religious Federation and it ultimately was given to Kokoro Assisted Living, a home for senior citizens, most of whom are from the Japanese-American community. Kokoro opened in 2003.

== See also ==
- Buddhism in the United States
- List of San Francisco Designated Landmarks
