= Peter E. Haas Jr. =

American businessman and philanthropist

- Born: 1947 (age 78–79)
- Education: Stanford University (BA)
- Occupation: businessman
- Known for: President and CEO of the Levi Strauss & Co
- Spouse(s): Joanne Christensen (until her death); Ginnie Haas
- Children: 3
- Parent(s): Josephine Baum Haas; Peter E. Haas
- Family: Rhoda Haas Goldman (aunt); Walter A. Haas Jr. (uncle); Walter A. Haas (grandfather); Abraham Haas (great-grandfather); Douglas E. Goldman (cousin); Robert D. Haas (cousin); Walter J. Haas (cousin)

Peter E. Haas Jr. (born 1947) is an American businessman and philanthropist.

== Biography ==
Haas was born in San Francisco, the son of Josephine (née Baum) and Peter E. Haas. His father was Jewish and his mother was a gentile from Kaw City, Oklahoma. He has two siblings: Margaret Haas Jones and Michael Stern Haas (predeceased). He graduated from Stanford University in 1969.

In 1972, he was appointed as a manager at the Levi Strauss Company. Thereafter, he worked in various capacities at the Levi Strauss Company. In 1980, he was named as vice president and general manager of the Menswear Division. In 1982, he was appointed Director of Materials Management for Levi Strauss USA. In 1996, he along with his father and cousin, Robert D. Haas, led a $2.5 billion leveraged buyout of Levi Strauss to ensure that it would remain in the control of the Haas family. All employees and family members would decide if they wanted to hold their shares or sell. After the transaction, 95.2% of shares were held by Haas family members with 43% held by Haas, his father, and Robert D. Haas; and 12.4% by Rhoda Haas Goldman.

Haas was either a director or trustee at the Levi Strauss Foundation, the Red Tab Foundation, the Joanne and Peter Haas Jr. Fund, the Walter and Elise Haas Fund, the Novato Youth Center Honorary Board, Trustee Emeritus of the San Francisco Foundation (1996–2005), and Vice President of the Peter E. Haas Jr. Family Fund.

== Personal life ==
Haas was married to Joanne Christensen until her death. They had three children: Jennifer C. Haas, Daniel Haas, and Bradley Haas. He is remarried to Ginnie Haas, and stepfather to her two daughters. Haas also has two stepbrothers from his father's second marriage to Miriam "Mimi" Lurie: Ari Lurie and Daniel Lurie. Upon his father's death in 2005, his father's interest in Levi Strauss (worth $1.9 billion in 1999) was passed to Haas, his stepmother Mimi Haas, and his sister.
