= Adam Geballe =

American microbiologist

Adam Philip Geballe
- Born: 1951 (age 74–75)
- Parent(s): Frances Koshland Geballe; Theodore H. Geballe

Adam P. Geballe is an American microbiologist and an Elected Fellow of the American Association for the Advancement of Science. Currently, he is a Professor at University of Washington, an investigator at Fred Hutchinson Cancer Research Center, and a physician at Seattle Cancer Care Alliance.

== Biography ==
Geballe is the son of Frances "Sissy" (née Koshland) and Theodore H. Geballe. His father is a physicist and his mother is the daughter of Daniel E. Koshland Sr. of the Haas family, owners of Levi Strauss & Co. He has five siblings: Gordon Theodore Geballe, Alison Frances Geballe, Monica Thompson, Jennifer Geballe Norman, and Ernest Henry Geballe. He earned his B.A. at Stanford University and his M.D. at Duke University.

== Research ==
Adam Geballe's research has primarily focused on the mechanisms used by human cytomegalovirus to evade the host immune response. In particular, his group has identified and characterized the process by which the viral proteins pTRS1 and pIRS1 interfere with the host sensing of RNA mediated by the sensor PKR. Additionally, his group researches poxvirus evasion of host immune responses, as well as various aspects of how viruses interact with host translational machinery. His most cited paper is Upstream open reading frames as regulators of mRNA translation,

== Publications ==
- A Single Amino Acid Dictates Protein Kinase R Susceptibility to Unrelated Viral Antagonists. Carpentier KS, Esparo NM, Child SJ, Geballe AP PLOS Pathogens. 2016 Oct; 12 10: e1005966
- The AIM2-like Receptors Are Dispensable for the Interferon Response to Intracellular DNA. Gray EE, Winship D, Snyder JM, Child SJ, Geballe AP, Stetson DB Immunity. 2016 08; 45 2: 255-66
- Evolution-guided functional analyses reveal diverse antiviral specificities encoded by IFIT1 genes in mammals. Daugherty MD, Schaller AM, Geballe AP, Malik HS eLife. 2016 May; 5
- An Evolutionary View of the Arms Race between Protein Kinase R and Large DNA Viruses. Carpentier KS, Geballe AP Journal of Virology. 2016 Jan; 90 7: 3280-3
- Essential role of protein kinase R antagonism by TRS1 in human cytomegalovirus replication. Braggin JE, Child SJ, Geballe AP Virology. 2016 Feb; 489 : 75-85
