= Richard Goldman =

American billionaire philanthropist

- Born: April 16, 1920
- Died: November 29, 2010 (aged 90)
- Education: University of California, Berkeley
- Occupations: Businessman; Philanthropist
- Known for: Richard and Rhoda Goldman Fund
- Spouse: Rhoda Haas (m. 1946; died 1996)
- Children: John D. Goldman; Douglas E. Goldman; Susan R. Gelman; Richard Goldman (deceased)
- Family: Daniel S. Goldman (grandson)

Richard N. Goldman (April 16, 1920 – November 29, 2010) was an American billionaire philanthropist who was the co-founder of the Goldman Environmental Prize in 1990 with his wife, Rhoda Haas Goldman, an heir to the Levi Strauss fortune. He founded the insurance company Goldman Insurance and Risk Management, and with his wife he established the Richard and Rhoda Goldman Fund in 1951.

== Business career ==
Goldman Insurance and Risk Management was acquired by the Willis Group in 2001.

== Philanthropy ==
Richard and Rhoda Goldman established the Goldman Environmental Prize in San Francisco, California, in 1990. Goldman's foundation, which is sometimes nicknamed the "Green Nobel," awarded six prizes annually worth US$150,000 to environmental activists representing six regions of the world. Approximately $13.2 million has been awarded to activists from more than 70 countries since the Goldmans established the award, as of 2010. The 1991 Goldman Environment Prize winner Wangari Maathai from Kenya and founder of the Green Belt Movement, was awarded the Nobel Peace Prize in 2004.

In addition to his work with the Goldman Environmental Prize, Goldman supported beautification projects in San Francisco, and co-founded the Richard and Rhoda Goldman Fund. Through his foundation, which is worth more than one billion dollars, Goldman funded projects throughout the San Francisco Bay Area, including the Jewish Community Center of San Francisco and the Rhoda Goldman Plaza. Among his California projects were investments in solar power, and protection of redwood forests and sealife. In 2004, he was awarded the Chairman's Medal in the 11th Annual Heinz Award.

The Goldman School of Public Policy at the University of California, Berkeley is named after the Goldmans.

== Personal life ==
Richard Goldman was the son of lawyer Richard Samuel Goldman and his wife Alice Wertheim Goldman. He died at his home in San Francisco on November 29, 2010, at the age of 90. He was survived by his daughter, Susan, and two sons, John and Doug. He was predeceased by his wife, philanthropist Rhoda Haas Goldman, who died in 1996 and their son, Richard, who died in 1989. His grandson is Congressman Dan Goldman. A memorial service was held at Congregation Emanu-El in San Francisco. He is of Jewish descent.
