= Goldman School of Public Policy =

Public policy school at the University of California, Berkeley

- Former name: Graduate School of Public Policy
- Motto: How a better future gets made
- Type: Public professional school
- Established: 1969
- Parent institution: University of California, Berkeley
- Location: 2607 Hearst Avenue, Berkeley, California, 94720-7320, United States; 37°52′31.9″N 122°15′28.34″W
- Website: gspp.berkeley.edu

The Richard and Rhoda Goldman School of Public Policy, or the Goldman School of Public Policy (GSPP), is a public policy school and one of fourteen schools and colleges at the University of California, Berkeley. Originally named the Graduate School of Public Policy, it was founded in 1969 as one of the first public policy institutions in the United States.

== History ==
The Graduate School was renamed after the Richard and Rhoda Goldman Fund donated $10 million in 1997. As of August 2016, the dean is Henry E. Brady. The first dean was political scientist Aaron Wildavsky.

The building was originally designed by Ernest Coxhead in 1893 as the Beta Theta Pi fraternity house. It is located on the historic north side of the Berkeley campus. The building underwent seismic strengthening and received a Preservation Award from the Berkeley Architectural Heritage Association (BAHA).

The main component of the school's graduate curriculum is the two-year Master of Public Policy (MPP) program. The curriculum includes core courses that provide a foundation in subjects ranging from political elements of the decision-making process and legal analysis to such specific analytic tools and concepts as microeconomic theory and statistical modeling. The curriculum also includes five electives, taken either at GSPP or elsewhere at Berkeley.

Students work at a summer policy internship between their first and second years and complete an analysis, in groups and individually, during the spring semester of each year. Locally- and nationally-known policy professionals, provide perspective and guidance to students.

GSPP offers a Master of Public Policy degree, a Master of Public Affairs degree for mid-career professionals, and Master of Development Practice (MDP) degree and a Ph.D. in Public Policy for those interested in furthering research in public policy methods. Though it does not award bachelor's degrees, it offers a minor program for undergraduates.

== Notable faculty ==
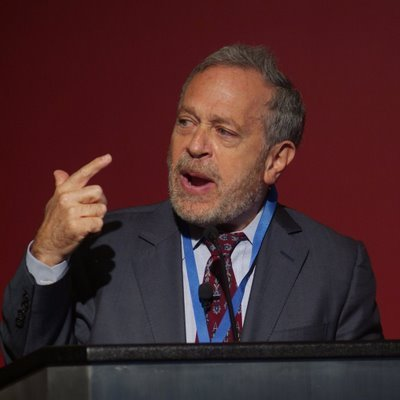
Robert Reich, Professor of Public Policy and former U.S. secretary of labor.

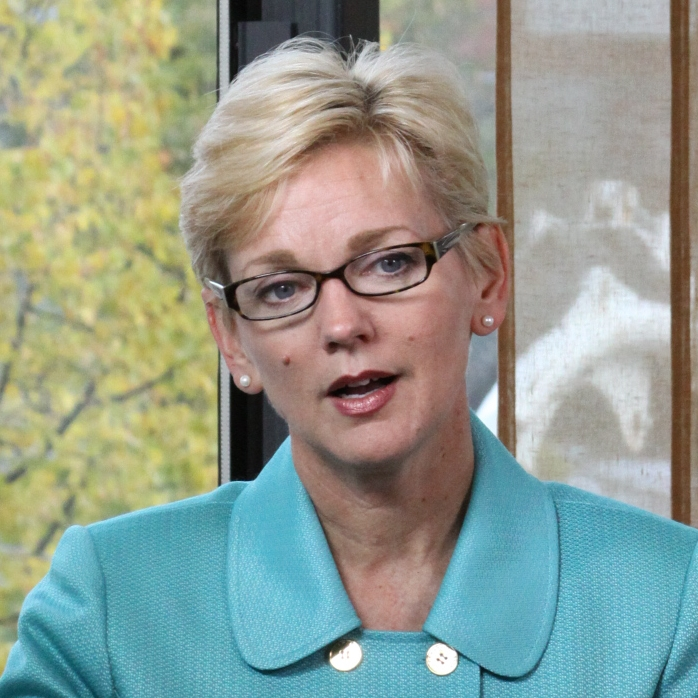
Jennifer Granholm, Distinguished Practitioner of Law and Public Policy and former attorney general and governor of Michigan.

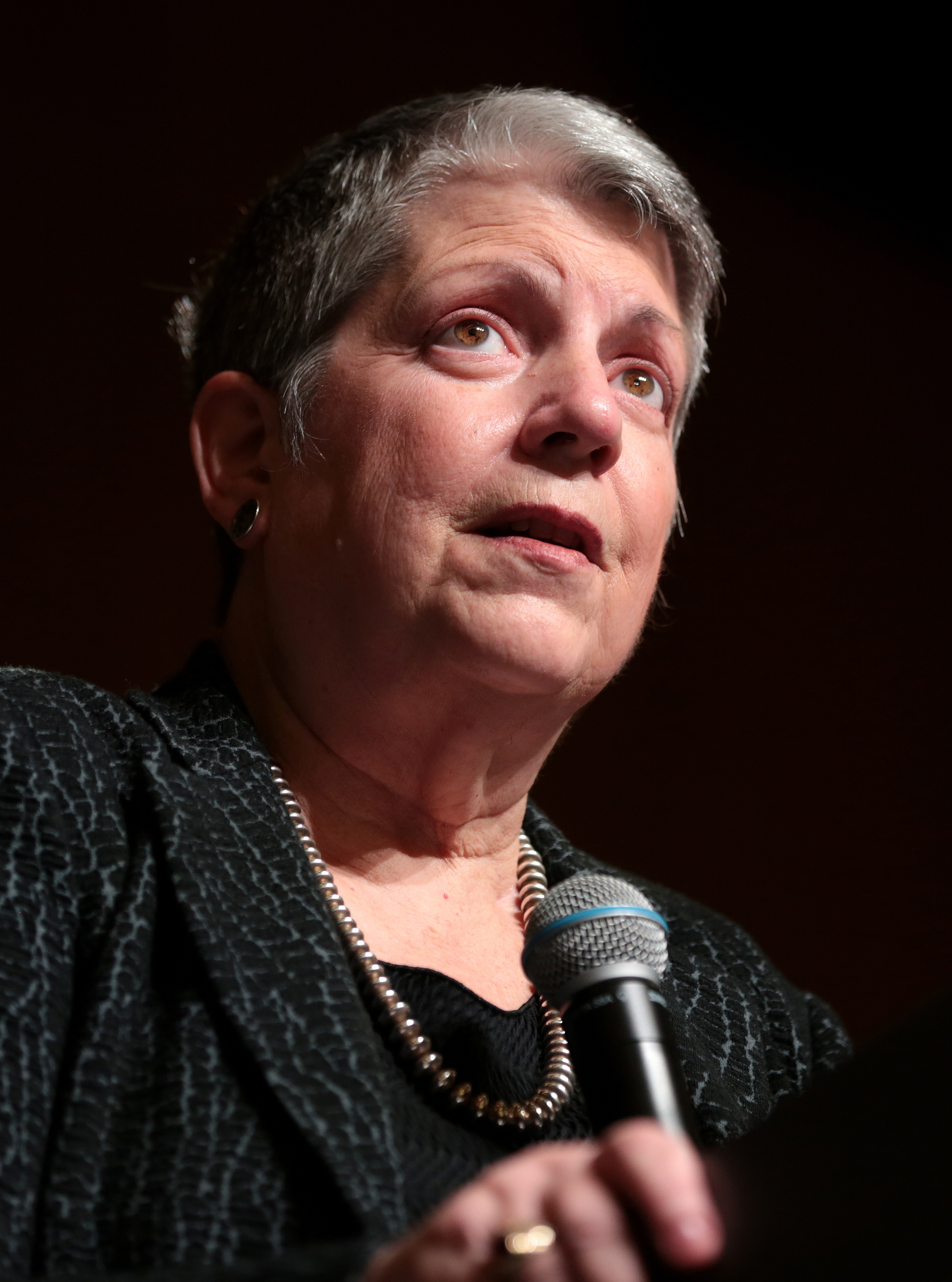
Janet Napolitano, Professor of Public Policy and former president of the University of California; 21st governor of Arizona and 3rd U.S. secretary of homeland security.

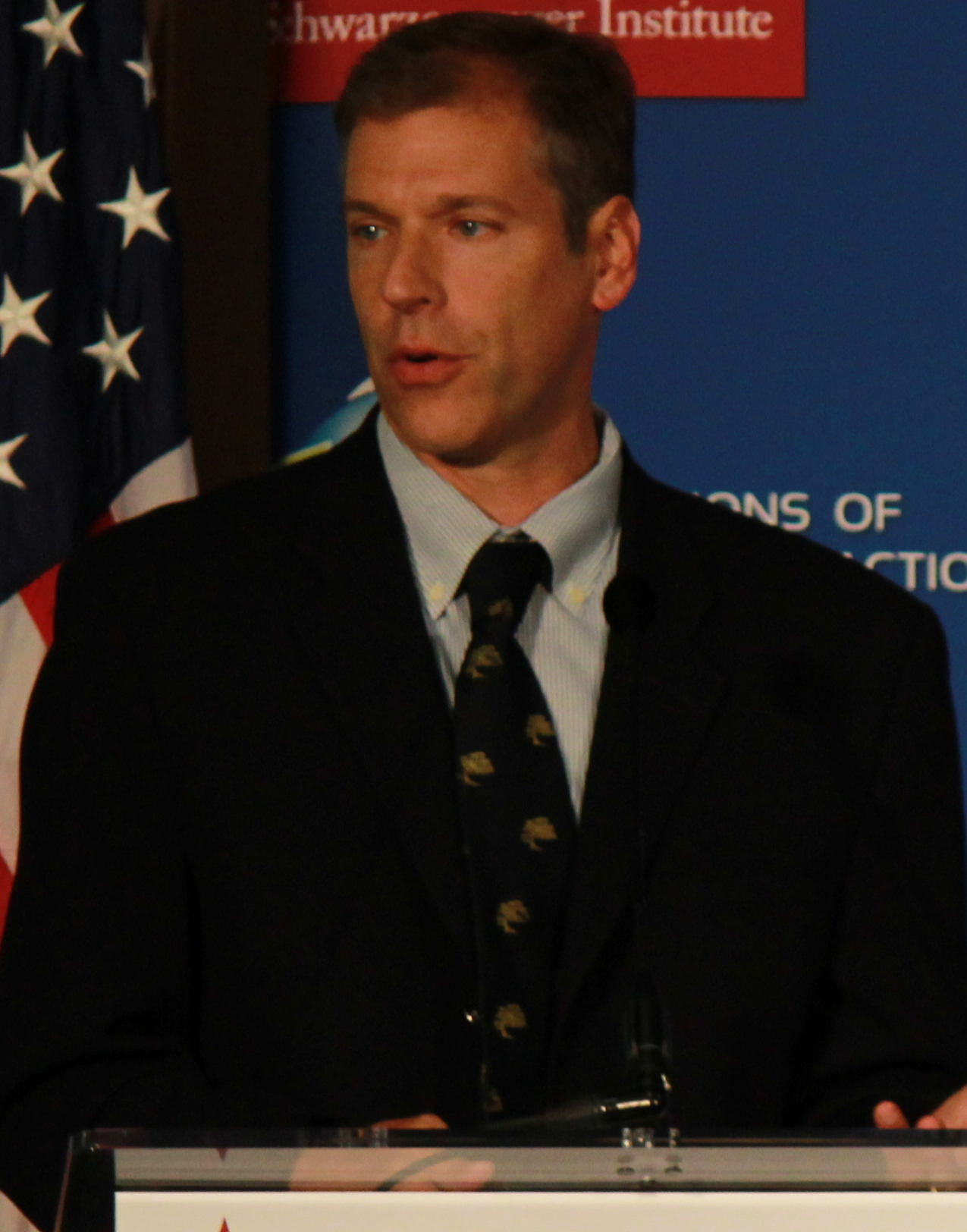
Daniel Kammen, member of the Intergovernmental Panel on Climate Change.

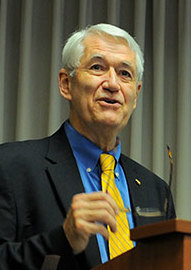
Robert J. Birgeneau, Professor of Public Policy, former Berkeley chancellor and University of Toronto president.

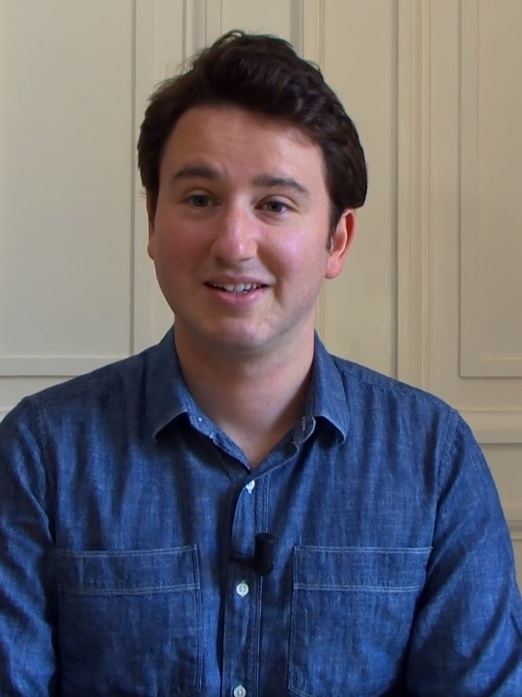
Gabriel Zucman, Associate Professor of Public Policy and Economics and director of the James M. and Cathleen D. Stone Center on Wealth and Income Inequality

== See also ==
- Goldman Environmental Prize
- Cloyne Court Hotel
