= Theodore H. Geballe =

American physicist (1920–2021)

- Born: Theodore Henry Geballe; January 20, 1920; San Francisco, California, U.S.
- Died: October 23, 2021 (aged 101); Woodside, California, U.S.
- Other name: Ted Geballe
- Education: University of California, Berkeley
- Known for: Thermodynamics of semiconductors, High temperature superconductivity.
- Awards: Oliver E. Buckley Condensed Matter Prize (1970)
- Scientific career
- Fields: Condensed matter physics Materials science
- Workplaces: Stanford University; Bell Labs
- Thesis: The thermodynamic and magnetic properties of single crystal cupric sulfate pentahydrate below 4K. (1950)
- Doctoral advisor: William Giauque

Theodore Henry Geballe (January 20, 1920 – October 23, 2021) was an American physicist who was a professor of applied physics at Stanford University. He was known for his work on the synthesis of novel materials of interest to several areas of physics and many interdisciplinary sciences.

== Biography ==
Theodore Geballe was born and brought up in a Jewish family in San Francisco, California, the son of Alice (Glaser) and Oscar Geballe. His grandfather left the Province of Posen in Prussia to move to the United States in about 1870. He attended the Galileo High School in San Francisco, graduating in 1937. Geballe then travelled across San Francisco Bay to attend college at the University of California, Berkeley. While still an undergraduate student at Berkeley, Geballe worked in William Giauque's lab to accurately measure the specific heat of gold.

In 1941, Geballe was called to active duty as an Army Ordnance Officer during the World War II. Geballe served in Australia, New Guinea and the Philippines and was responsible for maintaining guns.

After the war, Geballe returned to Berkeley as a graduate student of Giauque, receiving his PhD in chemistry in 1949 - the same year that Giauque won the Nobel Prize in Chemistry. In 1952, he moved to Bell Labs in Murray Hill, New Jersey. While at Bell labs, he worked on studying transport properties in semiconductors at very low temperatures, and also on studying properties of unconventional superconductors. In 1967, Geballe joined Stanford University as a professor in the newly founded department of applied physics as well as the department of materials science and engineering. Geballe was involved in research in the then-upcoming field of multilayered heterostructure materials.

Geballe served as the head of the department of applied physics at Stanford from 1975 to 1977, and was the director of the Center for Materials Research from 1978 to 1988.

In January 2020, Geballe's 100th birthday was marked by a celebratory conference.

== Awards and honors ==
Geballe, along with Bernd Matthias won the 1970 Oliver E. Buckley Condensed Matter Prize awarded by the American Physical Society "for experiments that challenged theoretical understanding and opened up the technology of high-field superconductors." Geballe also won the 1991 Von Hippel Award by the Materials Research Society, and was made a member of the National Academy of Sciences in 1973.

In 1989, he received the Bernd T. Matthias Prize.

In 2000, the new Laboratory for Advanced Materials at Stanford was named "The Theodore H. Geballe Laboratory for Advanced Materials" in his honor.

== Personal life ==
Geballe was married to Frances Koshland (1921–2019), daughter of Daniel E. Koshland Sr. and granddaughter of Abraham Haas. They have six children: Gordon Theodore Geballe, Alison Frances Geballe, Adam Phillip Geballe, Monica Ruth Geballe, Jennifer Corinne Geballe and Ernest Henry Geballe. He has 16 grandchildren and 10 great grandchildren.

He died at his home in Woodside, California, on October 23, 2021, at the age of 101.
