= Walter A. Haas =

American businessman

Walter A. Haas Sr.
- Born: May 11, 1889; San Francisco, California, US
- Died: December 7, 1979 (aged 90); San Francisco, California, US
- Education: University of California, Berkeley
- Known for: President of Levi Strauss & Co.
- Spouse: Elise Stern (m. 1914)
- Children: Walter A. Haas Jr. Peter E. Haas; Rhoda Haas Goldman
- Parent(s): Fanny Koshland; Abraham Haas
- Family: John D. Goldman (grandson); Douglas E. Goldman (grandson); Susie Gelman (granddaughter); Peter E. Haas Jr. (grandson); Bob Haas (grandson); Simon Koshland (grandfather)

Walter A. Haas Sr. (May 11, 1889 – December 7, 1979) was an American billionaire businessman who was the president and CEO (1928–1955) and chairman (1955–1970) of Levi Strauss & Co.

== Early life and education ==
Haas was born to a Jewish family, one of four children of Abraham Haas and Fanny Koshland. His father was an immigrant from Bavaria who was a founder of Hellman, Haas & Co. (later Haas, Baruch & Co., which ultimately merged with Smart & Final). His mother was a daughter of Simon Koshland, one of the most successful wool merchants in San Francisco. His siblings were Charles Haas (1888-?), Ruth Haas Lilienthal (1891-1975, m. Philip N. Lilienthal Jr.), and Eleanor Haas Koshland (1900-1959, m. Daniel E. Koshland Sr.).

In 1910, Haas graduated from the University of California, Berkeley, where he was a member of the Order of the Golden Bear.

Haas served in the U.S. Army Field Artillery during World War I.

== Levi Strauss career ==
Upon his return to the United States in 1919, he worked at the Levi Strauss & Company, then a small dry goods wholesaler and maker of work clothing, owned by the family of his wife. In 1928, he became president and was in that position until 1955; thereafter, he was chairman until 1970 and remained active in company affairs until his death in 1979. Haas' tenure and dedication at Levi Strauss – along with that of his business partner and brother-in-law Daniel E. Koshland Sr. – is widely credited with "saving" the company, leading it through the Great Depression, racial integration at its factories, the global popularization of the Levi brand, and the creation of the Levi Strauss Foundation.

== Politics and philanthropy ==
A Republican, he was an alternate delegate to the 1952 Republican National Convention. He was president of the San Francisco Jewish Welfare Federation.

== Personal life ==
In 1914, Walter Haas married Elise Stern, the daughter of Sigmund Stern, who was a son of David Stern, who was the husband of Fanny Stern (née Strauss), the sister of Levi Strauss (Strauss died unmarried and without children and deeded his company to his nephews, the four surviving sons of David Stern: Jacob, Sigmund, Louis and Abraham). Walter and Elise Haas had three children: Walter A. Haas Jr., Peter E. Haas Sr., and Rhoda Haas Goldman.

In 1989, the University of California, Berkeley Regents voted to rename the business school the Haas School of Business in his honor, after a large gift from the Haas family.
