= San Francisco Foundation =

American philanthropy organization

San Francisco Foundation is a San Francisco Bay Area philanthropy organization. It is one of the largest community foundations in the United States. Its mission is to mobilize resources and act as a catalyst for change to build strong communities, foster civic leadership, and promote philanthropy in the San Francisco Bay Area. While it has always supported a wide range of causes to improve life in the San Francisco Bay Area, the foundation has long emphasized social justice, racial equity, and affordable housing. Its current CEO is Fred Blackwell Jr.

== History ==
On January 16, 1948, the San Francisco Foundation officially launched with a luncheon at the Sir Francis Drake Hotel just off of San Francisco's Union Square. The foundation was created by Marjorie de Young Elkus of the Columbia Foundation, Leslie Ganyard of the Rosenberg Foundation, and Daniel E. Koshland Sr. of Levi Strauss & Co, who served as the foundation's first chairman. The foundation was established to provide the community with "a contemporary agency sensitive to current social needs, and one which will help build a future which will magnify the opportunities of generations yet to be born," according to the foundation's inaugural press release.

== Grantmaking, programs, and funds ==
San Francisco Foundation partners with donors to provide grants to thousands of nonprofit organizations each year. As of the end of fiscal year 2025, the foundation's total assets under management were $1.9 billion, with a total of $216 million in grants to nonprofit organization.

== Collaboratives ==
San Francisco Foundation works with various partners in several affiliated organizations that advance the foundation's agenda: the Partnership for the Bay's Future, ReWork the Bay, and HOPE SF.

== Awards and scholarships ==
San Francisco Foundation issues awards and scholarships to youth and artists to promote leadership, support disadvantaged community members, and foster artistic growth: the Koshland Young Leader Awards, SFF/Nomadic Press Literary Award, Murphy Award and the Cadogan Scholarships, and the Rella Lossy Award.
