= Lazarus Dinkelspiel =

19th century American businessman

- Born: 1824; Michelfeld, Kingdom of Württemberg
- Died: 1900 (age 76); San Francisco, California
- Occupation: Businessman
- Known for: Founder of L. Dinkelspiel & Co.
- Spouse: Pauline Hess
- Children: 8

Lazarus Dinkelspiel (1824–1900) was an American businessman who founded L. Dinkelspiel & Co.

== Biography ==
Dinkelspiel was born in 1824 to a Jewish family in Michelfeld, Kingdom of Württemberg. In 1833, his family immigrated to the United States first to New York and then New Hampshire. In 1845, he moved to California and was successful selling goods to the gold miners. In 1853, he moved to San Francisco where he opened a wholesale dry goods business with Ulrich Simon, a fellow German Jewish immigrant; the business was named Simon & Dinkelspiel. In 1861, they added Jonas Adler as a partner and the company became Simon, Dinkelspiel, & Adler in New York City and Simon, Dinkenspiel & Co in San Francisco. In 1867, Dinkelspiel bought his partners out and the company was then known as L. Dinkelspiel & Co. His company became one of the largest dry goods businesses in the Western states. In 1893, he retired.

Dinkelspiel served as vice-president of Congregation Emanu-El in San Francisco, was member of the International Order of B'nai B'rith, and the International Order of Odd Fellows.

== Personal life ==
In 1861, he married Pauline Hess (died 1907); they had eight children: Henry Dinkelspiel, Samuel Dinkelspiel, Joseph Dinkelspiel, Leon Dinkelspiel, Melville Dinkelspiel, Edgar Dinkelspiel, Theresa Dinkelspiel Kalisher (married to Edward Kalisher), and Frieda Dinkelspiel Silverman. Dinkelspiel died in 1900.
