= Rhoda Haas Goldman =

American billionaire philanthropist (1924–1996)

- Born: Rhoda Frances Haas; September 20, 1924; San Francisco, California, US
- Died: February 17, 1996 (aged 72)
- Education: University of California, Berkeley
- Known for: Richard and Rhoda Goldman Fund
- Spouse: Richard Goldman (m. 1946)
- Children: John D. Goldman; Douglas E. Goldman; Susan R. Gelman; Richard W. Goldman (deceased)
- Parent(s): Elise Stern; Walter A. Haas
- Family: David Stern (great-grandfather); Daniel S. Goldman (grandson); Simon Koshland (great-grandfather)

Rhoda Haas Goldman (September 20, 1924 – February 17, 1996) was an American billionaire in San Francisco, California. She was a member of the board of directors of Levi Strauss & Co. from 1985 until her death in 1996.

== Biography ==
Rhoda Goldman was the only daughter born to Walter A. Haas and Elise Stern (an heiress to the Levi Strauss fortune), and great-granddaughter of David Stern. In 1996, her family made $1.3 billion in accepting the leveraged buyout of the Levi Strauss company, which she opposed. She died of a heart attack during the execution of the transaction.

She was a graduate of the University of California, Berkeley and, in 1946, she married fellow Berkeley alumnus Richard N. Goldman. In 1951, the couple founded the Richard and Rhoda Goldman Fund, a foundation that has donated over $680 million to various organizations.

The Goldman School of Public Policy at Berkeley is named after the Goldmans.

She was president of the San Francisco Symphony, chairwoman of San Francisco's Memorial to the Six Million Victims of the Holocaust, director of the Mount Zion Health System, president of the Mount Zion Hospital and Medical Center, and president of Congregation Emanu-El, the city's largest Reform Jewish synagogue.

She was a major supporter of environmental causes and San Francisco arts organizations and a co-founder with her husband of the Goldman Environment Prize in 1990.

== Personal life ==
Rhoda and Richard Goldman married in 1946. They had four children: John D. Goldman, Douglas E. Goldman, Susan R. Gelman, and Richard W. Goldman (deceased). Her grandson, son of Richard, is attorney and New York Congressman Daniel S. Goldman. Funeral services were held at Congregation Emanu-El in San Francisco.
