= Douglas E. Goldman =

American businessman and philanthropist

- Born: 1952 (age 73–74); San Francisco, California, US
- Education: University of California, Berkeley (BA); Tel Aviv University Faculty of Medicine (MD)
- Occupations: Physician; Businessman; Philanthropist
- Spouse: Lisa Goldman
- Children: 3
- Parent(s): Rhoda Haas Goldman; Richard Goldman
- Family: Susie Goldman Gelman (sister); John D. Goldman (brother); Richard Goldman (brother); Peter E. Haas (uncle); Walter A. Haas, Jr. (uncle); Peter E. Haas Jr. (cousin)

Douglas E. Goldman (born 1952) is an American businessman, philanthropist, and member of the Haas family.

== Biography ==
Goldman was born to a Jewish family, the son of Richard and Rhoda (née Haas) Goldman. He has a sister and two brothers: Susie Goldman Gelman, John D. Goldman, and Richard Goldman (deceased). His grandparents were Elise and Walter Haas Sr. Goldman earned B.A. in psychology from University of California, Berkeley and then graduated from medical school at Tel Aviv University. After school he worked as an emergency room physician at Mount Zion Hospital in San Francisco. He developed the software to establish a genetic repository for Jews at the Museum of the Diaspora in Israel; it later became the Douglas E. Goldman Jewish Genealogy Center. He later founded the software firm Certain Inc., which develops event-management software which assists companies in planning, promoting, and managing events.

== Philanthropy ==
In 1992, Goldman and his wife established the Lisa and Douglas Goldman Fund which supports organizations that promote democracy and civil liberties, education and literacy, and the environment. He previously served on the board of the Richard and Rhoda Goldman Fund (which has donated $700 million to more than 2,500 grantees since 1961) founded by his parents. The fund was dissolved in December 2015 and its $280 million in assets was transferred to separate foundations belonging to the couple’s three children. He also serves on the board of the Walter and Elise Haas Fund (founded by his grandparents) and the Stern Grove Festival Association (named after his great-grandmother Rosalie Meyer Stern). He is president of the Goldman Environmental Foundation which annually awards the $150,000 Goldman Environmental Prize for grassroots environmental activism, is a member of the Haas School of Business Board, and is a trustee of the UC Berkeley Foundation. The Lisa and Douglas Goldman Plaza is named in his honor after he made a $10 million gift to Cal Athletics intercollegiate program. Goldman strongly supports Jewish causes including financial support for the Moishe House. In 2015, he was awarded the Jewish-Civic Leadership Award. He worked with his father to successfully defeat a resolution made by the University of California Student Senate to divest from Israel.

== Personal life ==
Goldman has a daughter, Jennifer, and twin sons: Jason and Matthew, who both sit on the boards of the Haas School's Center for Nonprofit and Public Leadership and the Lisa and Douglas Goldman Fund.
