= Philip N. Lilienthal =

American banker and philanthropist

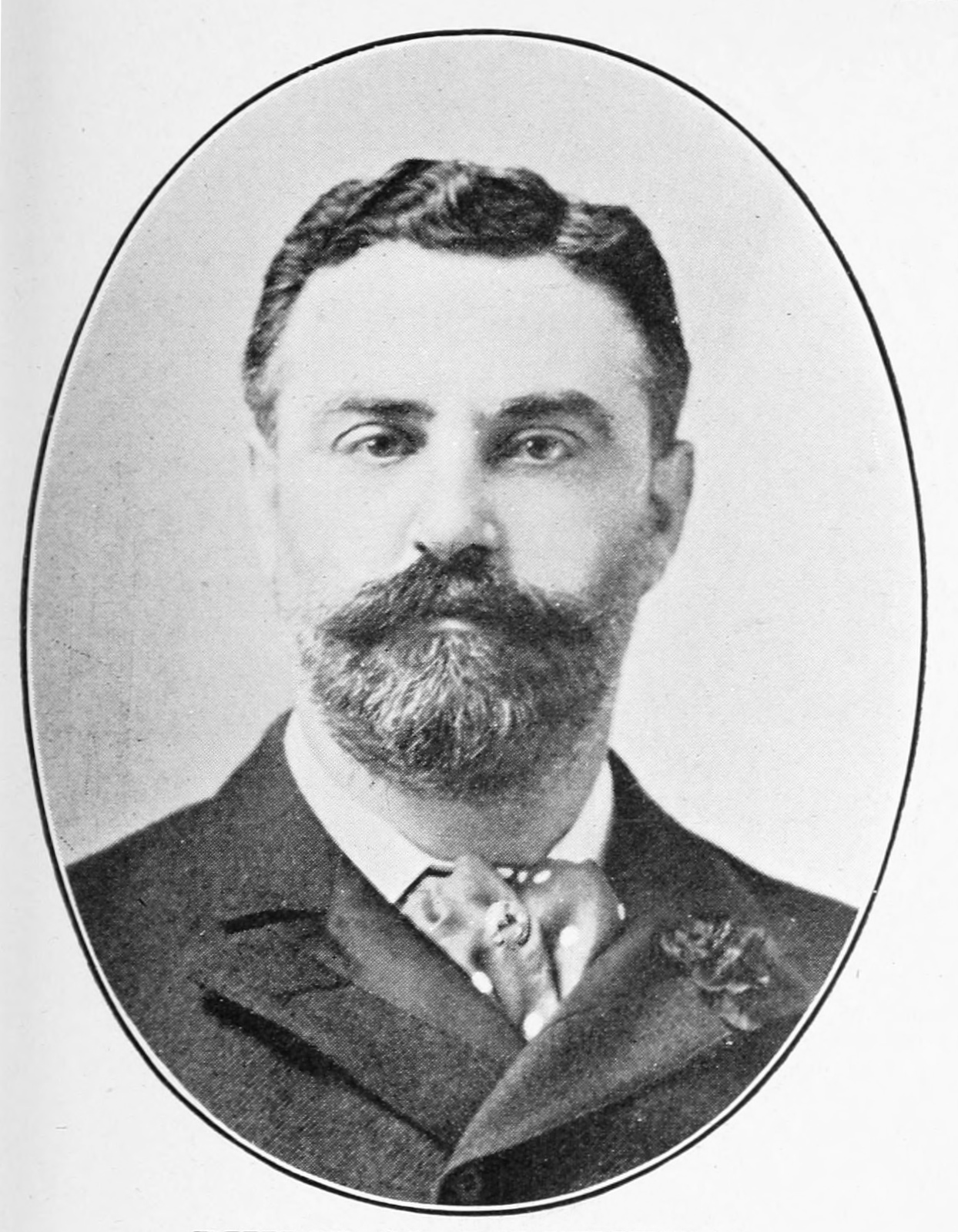
- Born: Philip Nettre Lilienthal; 1850
- Died: 1908 (age 58)
- Occupation: Banker
- Children: Joseph L. Lilienthal; Elsie Lilienthal Beer; Phillip N. Lilienthal, Jr. Theodore Max Lilienthal
- Parent(s): Babette Nettre Lilienthal; Max Lilienthal

Philip Nettre Lilienthal (1850–1908) was an American banker and philanthropist. He served as a director of the California Title Insurance & Trust Company of San Francisco, the San Francisco Free Library, Union Iron Works, and was President of the Philharmonic Society. He co-founded the Russian Jewish Alliance with Rabbi Jacob Voorsanger which assisted Jews who had fled Russia for the United States.

== Biography ==
Philip Nettre Lilienthal was born to a Jewish family in New York City in 1850, the son of Babette "Pepi" Nettre (born 1821) and Max Lilienthal, a leading Rabbi in Reform Judaism. He was raised in Cincinnati, Ohio. At the age of 14, he worked for Stix, Krause & Co. and at the age of 17, moved to New York City where he worked for James and Joseph Seligman at J. & W. Seligman & Co. In 1869, he was sent to San Francisco to run the Seligman Bank. In 1873, he co-founded the Anglo-Californian Bank with Ignatz Sheinhart. He went on to found several other banks: the Porterville Bank of Porterville, California; the Bank of South San Francisco, the Bank of Pleasanton, the Bank of Willits, and the Bank of Eureka.

Lilienthal married Isabella Seligman, daughter of Joseph Seligman; they had 4 children: Joseph L. Lilienthal, Elsie Lilienthal Beer (wife of Dr. Edwin Beer), Phillip N. Lilienthal, Jr. (married to Ruth Haas, daughter of Abraham Haas), and Theodore Max Lilienthal. In 1908, Lilienthal died in an automobile accident. He was a member of Temple Emanu-El in San Francisco.
