= David Stern (American businessman) =

American businessman (1820 - 1875)

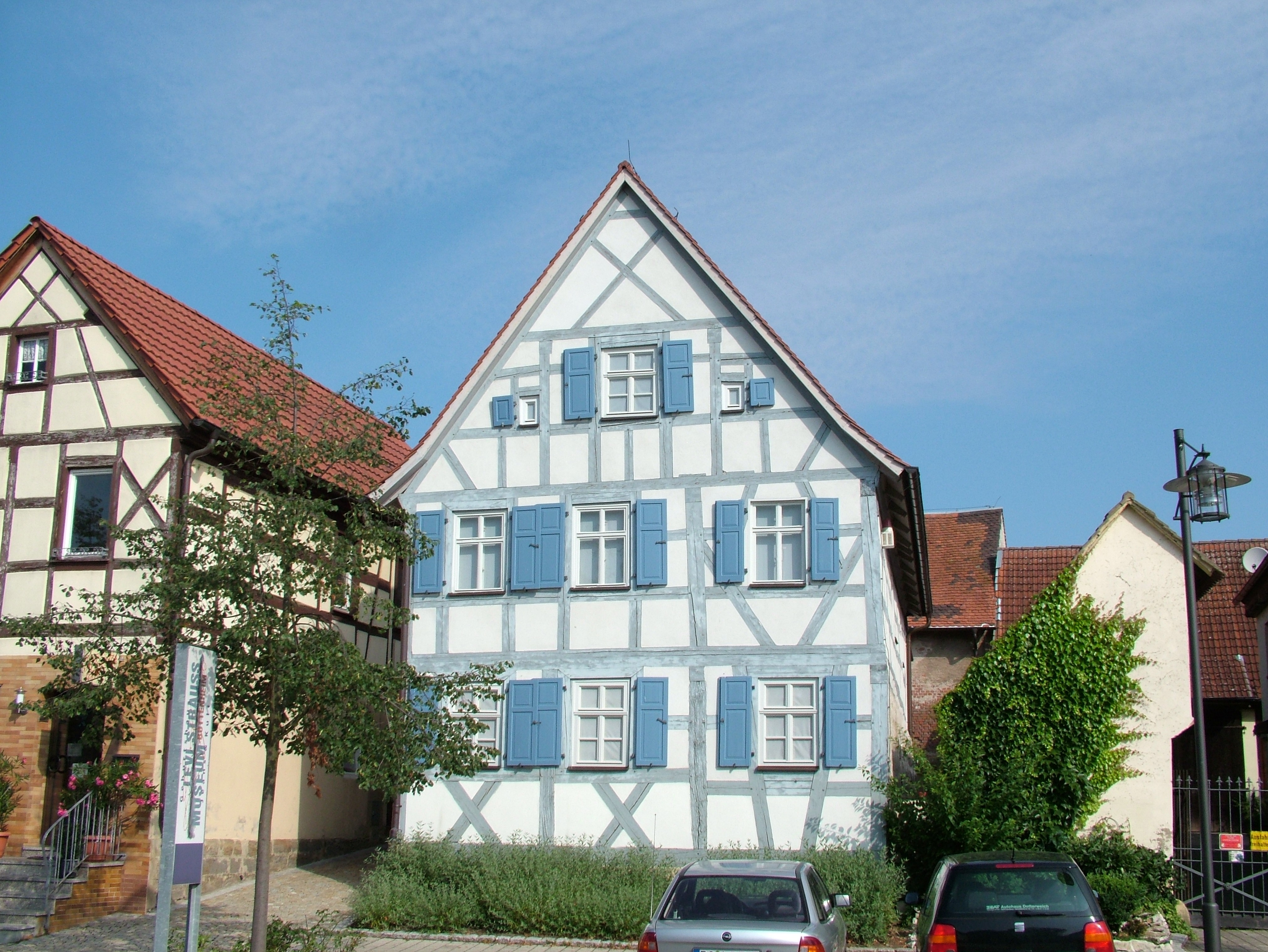
- Levi-Strauss-house in Buttenheim, Germany
- Born: 1820; Kingdom of Bavaria
- Died: 1875 (aged 54); San Francisco, California, U.S.
- Occupation: Businessman
- Spouse: Fanny Strauss
- Children: 8
- Family: Levi Strauss (brother-in-law); Rhoda Haas Goldman (great granddaughter); Peter E. Haas (great grandson); Walter A. Haas Jr. (great grandson)

David Stern (1820–1875) was an American businessman who co-founded Levi Strauss & Co. with his brother-in-law, Levi Strauss.

== Biography ==
David Stern was born to a Jewish family in the Kingdom of Bavaria in 1820. In the 1840s, he immigrated to the United States first to New York then the American South and finally to San Francisco in 1853 or 1855 where he was later joined by his brother-in-law Levi Strauss. Strauss had been sent to San Francisco — which was booming due to the gold rush — to scout out a larger location for the family merchandising company. In 1858, he was listed as a co-owner of the company under the name Strauss, Levi (David Stern & Lewis Strauss) importers clothing in the San Francisco Directory where Stern was its manager and Strauss as its sales manager. In 1860, the company was renamed as Levi Strauss & Co. In 1873, the company received the patent for its jeans, the first to use metal rivets on workpants made with denim cloth.

== Personal life ==
In 1850, he married Fanny Strauss, the sister of Levi Strauss, in New York. They had 8 children: Jacob and Caroline (both born in New York); and Henry, Sigmund, Louis (who married Lucie Cahen, Palo Alto patroness), Harriet "Hattie", Abraham, and Lillian (all born in San Francisco). He was a member of the Eureka Benevolent Society (established by August Helbing and other Bavarians, later the Jewish Family Service) and Congregation Emanu-El. Two of his sons married sisters, the daughters of Lazard Frères head Marc Eugene Meyer: his son, Sigmund Stern, married Rosalie Meyer; and his son, Abraham Stern, married Elise Meyer. Sigmund's only child, Elise, married Walter A. Haas, the son of Abraham Haas, whose descendants are the current owners of Levi Strauss & Co.

David Stern died in 1875 in San Francisco. The company incorporated in 1890 with Levi Strauss as president, Jacob Stern as First Vice President, Sigmund Stern as Second Vice President, Louis Stern as Treasurer, and Abraham Stern as Secretary. After the death of Levi Strauss in 1902 — who had no children — Stern's sons took over ownership of the company. The Sigmund Stern Recreation Grove is named for his son.
