= Daniel E. Koshland Sr. =

American businessman

- Born: 1892; San Francisco
- Died: 1979 (aged 86–87)
- Education: University of California, Berkeley (BA)
- Occupation: Businessman
- Known for: CEO of Levi Strauss & Co.
- Spouses: Eleanor Haas (until her death); Lucile Heming
- Children: with Haas: --Daniel E. Koshland Jr.; --Frances Koshland Geballe; --Phyllis Koshland Friedman
- Parents: Corinne Schweitzer; Marcus Koshland
- Family: Simon Koshland (grandfather)

Daniel E. Koshland Sr. (1892–1979) was an American businessman who served as the president and CEO (1955-1958) of Levi Strauss & Co.

== Biography ==
Koshland was born to a Jewish family in San Francisco, the son of Marcus Koshland and Corinne Schweitzer. He was the grandson of Simon Koshland, one of the most successful wool merchants in San Francisco who also taught Koshland's father the trade. Koshland graduated from Lowell High School in San Francisco and graduated with a B.A. in Economics from the University of California, Berkeley. After graduation he worked as a banker in New York City and in 1917, returned to San Francisco where he attended the US Army officer training program at the Presidio. He was not allowed to transfer to the Intelligence Corps overseas during World War I because of his German last name and instead served at Governor's Island, New York.

In 1922, he returned to San Francisco where he joined his brother-in-law Walter A. Haas Sr. at Levi Strauss & Co. which was at the time a small manufacturer of work clothing and a small drygoods wholesaler. Koshland's tenure at Levi Strauss – along with that of his brother-in-law – is widely credited with saving the company leading it through the Great Depression, racial integration at its factories, the global popularization of the Levi brand, and the creation of the Levi Strauss Foundation. Koshland served as CEO of Levi Strauss & Co. from 1955 to 1958.

== Philanthropy ==
In 1948, he established the San Francisco Foundation. Koshland served with various charities in varying capacities in the San Francisco area including the Industrial Welfare Commission; the Human Rights Commission; the San Francisco Juvenile Probation Committee; Planned Parenthood; Mount Zion Hospital; the Community Chest; the United Bay Area Crusade; the Citizen's Lobby for Freedom and Fair Play; the San Francisco Development Commission on Low-Cost Housing; the Council on Civic Unity; and the American Red Cross. He organized the business community to create jobs for World War II refugees and served as the national vice chairman of the United Negro College Fund. He was active in the founding of Brandeis University and promoted the development low-cost community colleges specifically the College of San Mateo and Cañada College. Several awards have been dedicated in his honor including the Jewish Community Federation's Haas/Koshland Award, the Koshland Young Leader Award of the San Francisco Foundation, and the Butler Koshland Fellowships.

== Personal life ==
In 1918, he married his cousin Eleanor Haas (Eleanor's mother Fanny was Koshland's aunt), daughter of Haas family patriarch Abraham Haas. They had three children: Daniel E. Koshland Jr. (married to Marian Elliot Koshland), Frances "Sissy" Koshland Geballe (married to Theodore H. Geballe), and Phyllis Koshland Friedman. Eleanor would later be diagnosed with multiple sclerosis and would devote a good portion of her philanthropy toward people with disabilities. After the death of his first wife, he married Lucile Heming in 1959.
