= Congregation Emanu-El (San Francisco) =

Jewish synagogue in California, United States

Temple Emanu-El
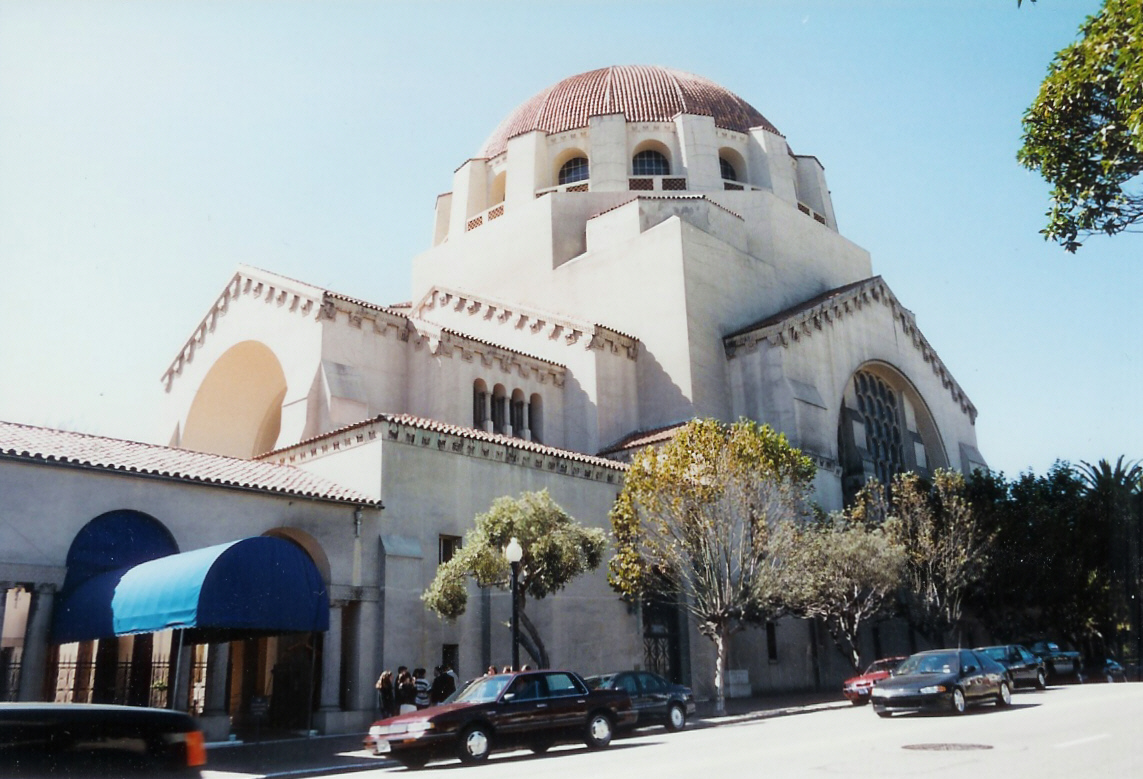

Religion
- Affiliation: Reform Judaism
- Leadership: Ryan Bauer (senior rabbi); Joel Roos and Jon Holman (Presidents)
- Status: Active

Location
- Location: 2 Lake Street, San Francisco, California, United States
- Interactive map of Temple Emanu-El
- Coordinates: 37.7872°N 122.4597°W

Architecture
- Architect: Arthur Brown Jr.
- Style: Byzantine Revival
- Completed: 1926

Specifications
- Dome: 1
- Dome height (outer): 150 feet

Website
- www.emanuelsf.org

Congregation Emanu-El of San Francisco, California, is one of the three oldest Jewish congregations in California, (Note: Temple Israel (Stockton, California) was the first. The two next oldest congregations in California are Emanu-El and Sherith Israel in San Francisco. Both were founded in 1851. The two synagogues were founded simultaneously because the city's Jews could not agree on whether to follow the prayer customs of the Polish or German Jews. Emanu-El was founded as the congregation of the German Jews and Sherith Israel as the congregation of the Polish Jews.) and one of the largest Jewish congregations in the United States. A member of the Union for Reform Judaism, Congregation Emanu-El is a significant gathering place for the Bay Area Jewish community.

== History ==
During the Gold Rush in 1849, a small group of Jews held the first High Holy Days services in a tent in San Francisco; it was the first Jewish service on the West Coast of the United States. This group of traders and merchants founded Congregation Emanu-El sometime in 1850, and its charter was issued in April, 1851. The 16 signatories were mostly German Jews from Bavaria.

In 1860, Reform rabbi Elkan Cohn joined the Emanu-El congregation; in 1877, he led the congregation as the first in the West to join the Reform Movement. As the Reform Movement in Judaism spread in the United States during the early twentieth century, the synagogue became affiliated with this framework.

In 1884 Julie Rosewald became America's first female cantor when she began serving in Emanu-El, although she was not ordained. She served as a cantor there until 1893.

The congregation's landmark Sutter Street synagogue was destroyed by the 1906 San Francisco earthquake and subsequent fire. The synagogue was rebuilt on its current site and dedicated over three days, April 16, 17, and 18 in 1926.

In 2025, a $97 million renovation project was completed. A new floor level was added below street level to house offices, and a third floor of classrooms was added to house a pre-school. The grand arched main entrance was renovated, while the domed main sanctuary, the Martin Meyer sanctuary, and the small chapel were not altered.

Among its major programs today, the synagogue includes worship, youth and adult education programs, and also a major emphasis on social justice.

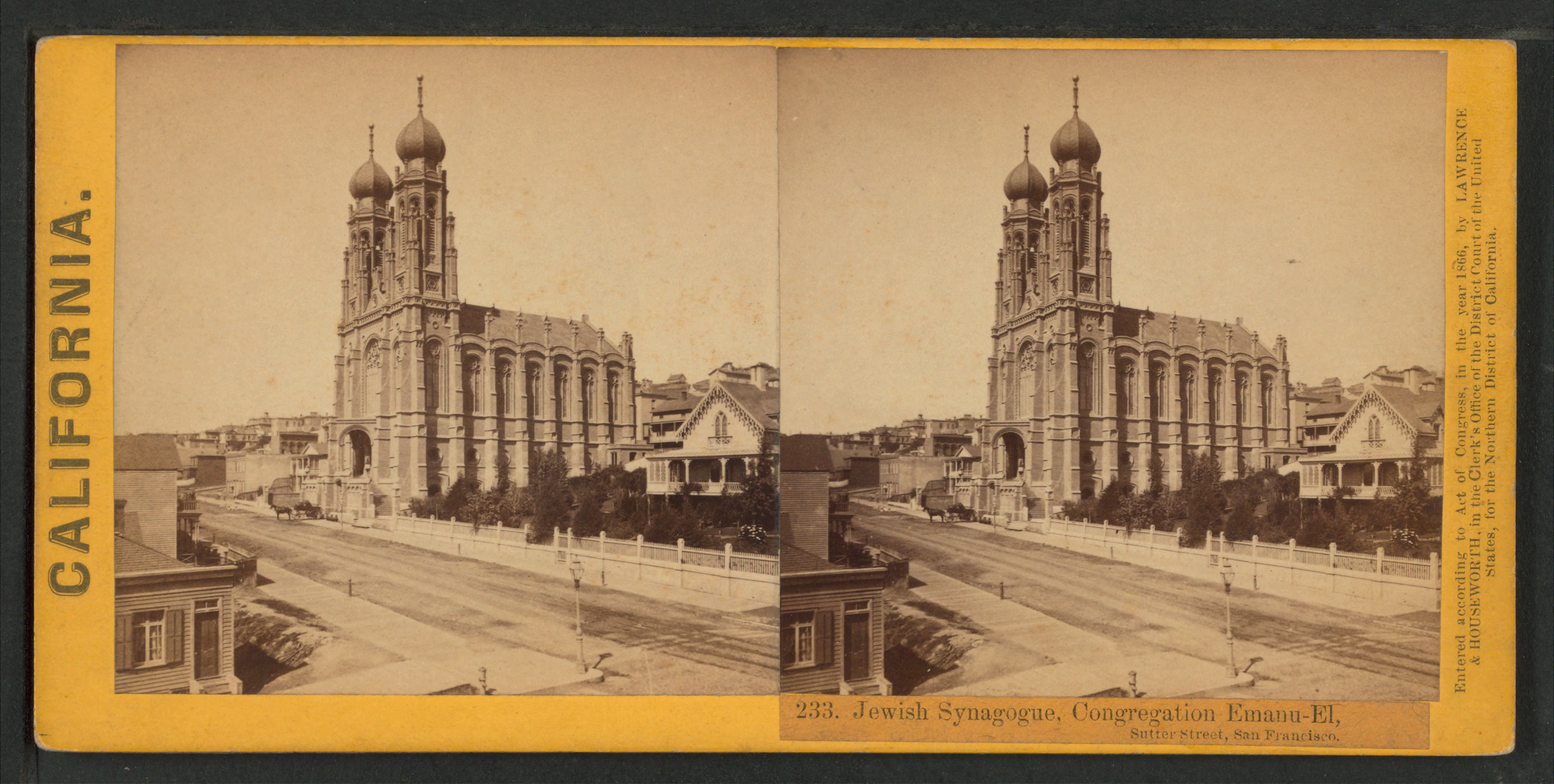
Early Temple Emanu-El. Sutter Street, San Francisco, from Robert N. Dennis collection of stereoscopic views

== Clergy ==
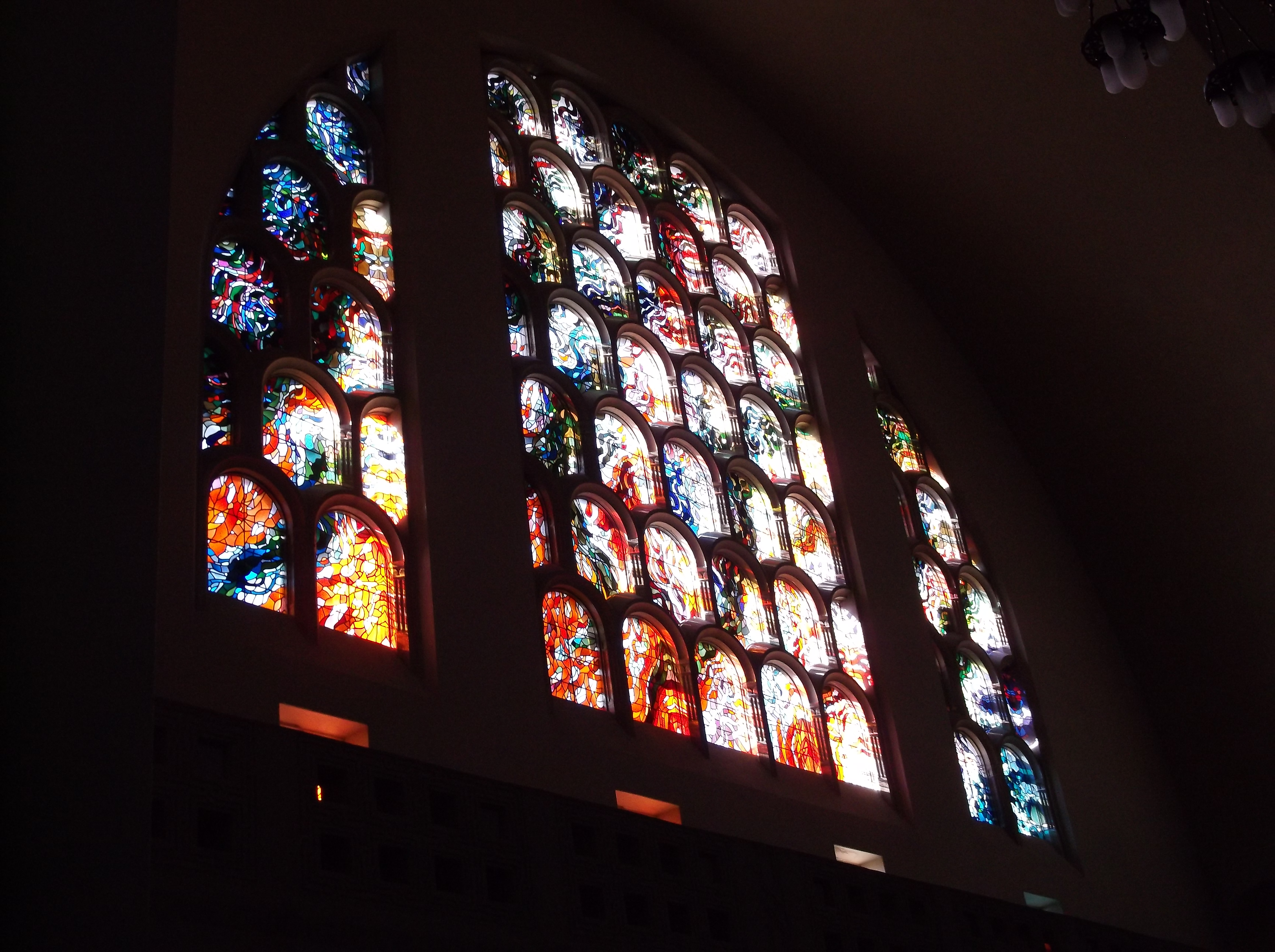
Stained glass window at Temple Emanu-El in San Francisco

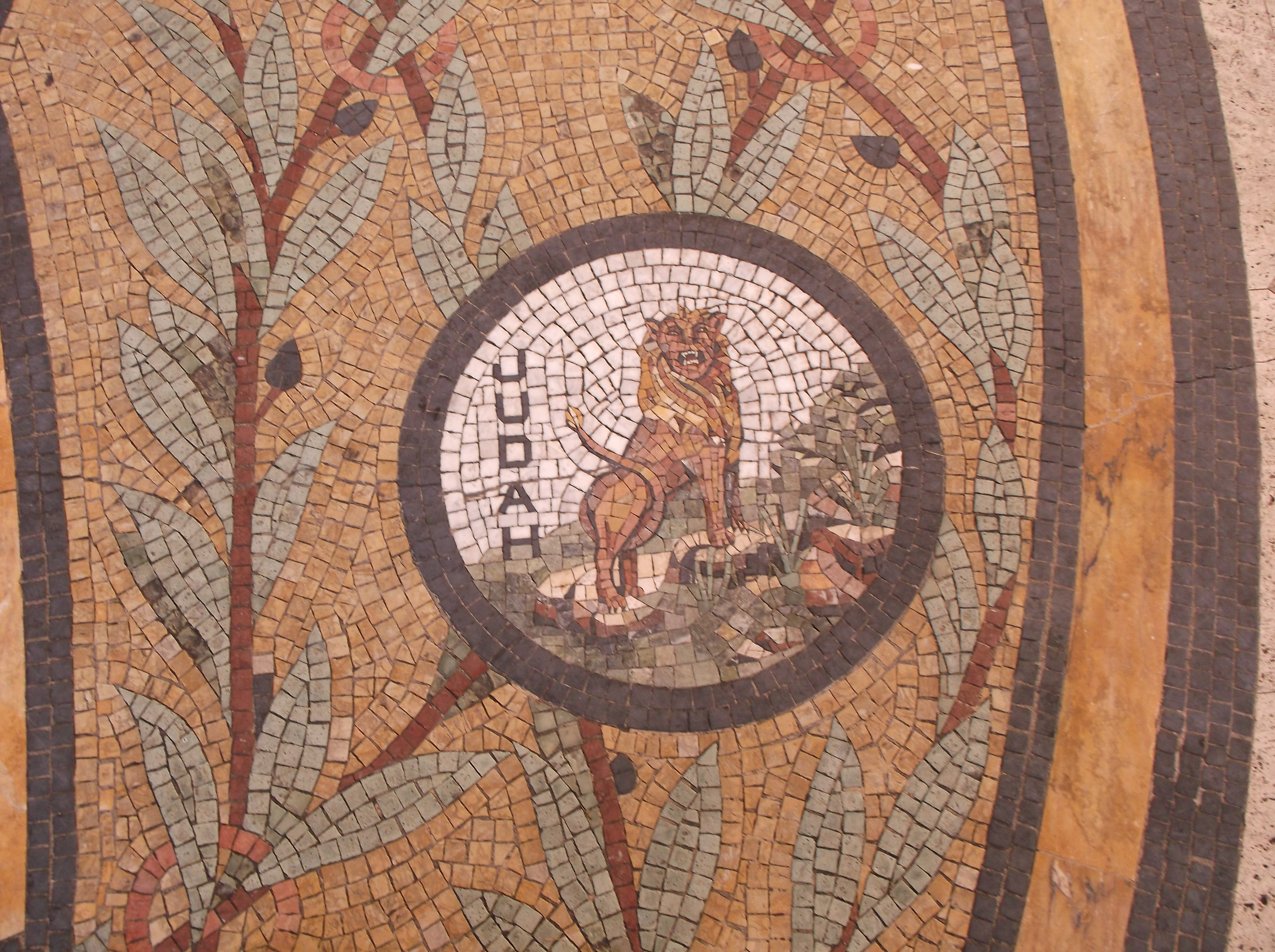
Mosaic at Temple Emanu-El in San Francisco

- Rabbi Julius Eckman (1854–1855)
- Rabbi Elkan Cohn (1860–1889)
- Rabbi Jacob Voorsanger (1889–1908)
- Rabbi Martin A. Meyer (1910–1923)
- Rabbi Louis Newman (1924–1930)
- Rabbi Irving Reichert (1930–1948)
- Rabbi Alvin Fine (1948–1964)
- Rabbi Meyer Heller (1950–1963)
- Cantor Joseph Portnoy (1959-1987)
- Rabbi Irving Hausman (1964–1967)
- Rabbi Joseph Asher (1967–1986)
- Rabbi Robert Kirschner (1981–1992)
- Rabbi Mark Schiftan (1987–1994)
- Cantor Roslyn Barak (1987–2015, Senior Cantor Emerita 2015-present)
- Rabbi Peretz Wolf-Prusan (1990–2010)
- Rabbi Stephen Pearce, D.D. Ph.D. (1992–2013, Senior Rabbi Emeritus, 2013–present)
- Rabbi Helen Cohn (1993–2005)
- Rabbi Lawrence Kushner (Scholar in Residence since 2002)
- Rabbi Sydney Mintz (1997–present)
- Cantor Marsha Attie (1998–present)
- Rabbi Ryan Bauer (2007–present)
- Rabbi Jonathan Jaffe (2007–2014)
- Rabbi Carla Fenves (2011–2020)
- Rabbi Beth Singer (2013–present)
- Rabbi Jonathan Singer (2013–present)
- Rabbi Jason Rodich (2015–2023)
- Cantor Arik Luck (2015-present)
- Rabbi Sarah Joselow Parris (2019–present)
- Rabbi Noah Westreich (2023–present)

== Notable members ==
- Larry Baer
- Jim Bennett, father of the 13th Prime Minister of Israel Naftali Bennett
- Joseph Brandenstein
- Stephen Breyer
- Lazarus Dinkelspiel
- Dianne Feinstein
- Donald Fisher
- Doris F. Fisher
- Aaron Fleishhacker
- Richard Goldman
- Rhoda Haas Goldman
- Evelyn Danzig Haas
- Peter E. Haas
- Walter A. Haas Jr.
- Warren Hellman
- Florence Prag Kahn
- Simon Koshland
- Philip N. Lilienthal
- Bob Lurie
- Daniel Lurie
- Isaac Magnin
- Raphael Peixotto
- Julie Rosewald
- Nell Sinton
- Douglas W. Shorenstein
- Theodore Solomons
- David Stern
- Levi Strauss
