= Levi Strauss =

German-American businessman (1829–1902)

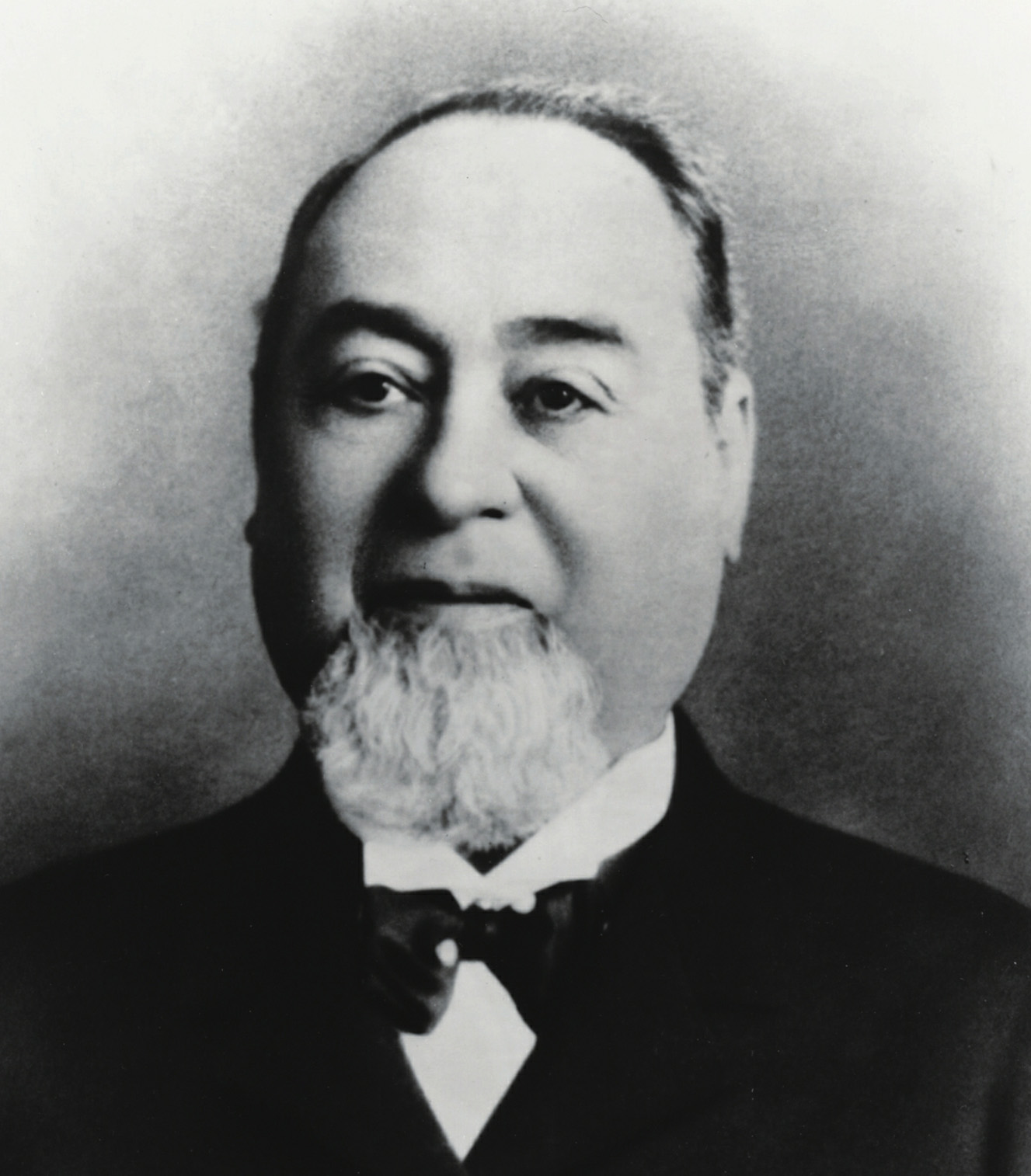
- Born: Löb Strauß; February 26, 1829; Buttenheim, Kingdom of Bavaria, German Confederation
- Died: September 26, 1902 (aged 73); San Francisco, California, U.S.
- Citizenship: German Confederation (1829–1853); United States (1853–1902)
- Occupation: Businessman
- Known for: Founding the first company to manufacture riveted blue jeans Founder of the Levi Strauss & Co.

Levi Strauss (/ˈliːvaɪ ˈstraʊs/ LEE-vy STROWSS; born Löb Strauß, German: [løːp ˈʃtʁaʊs]; February 26, 1829 – September 26, 1902) was a German-born American businessman who founded the first company to manufacture blue jeans. His firm of Levi Strauss & Co. (Levi's) began in 1853 in San Francisco, California.

== Early life ==
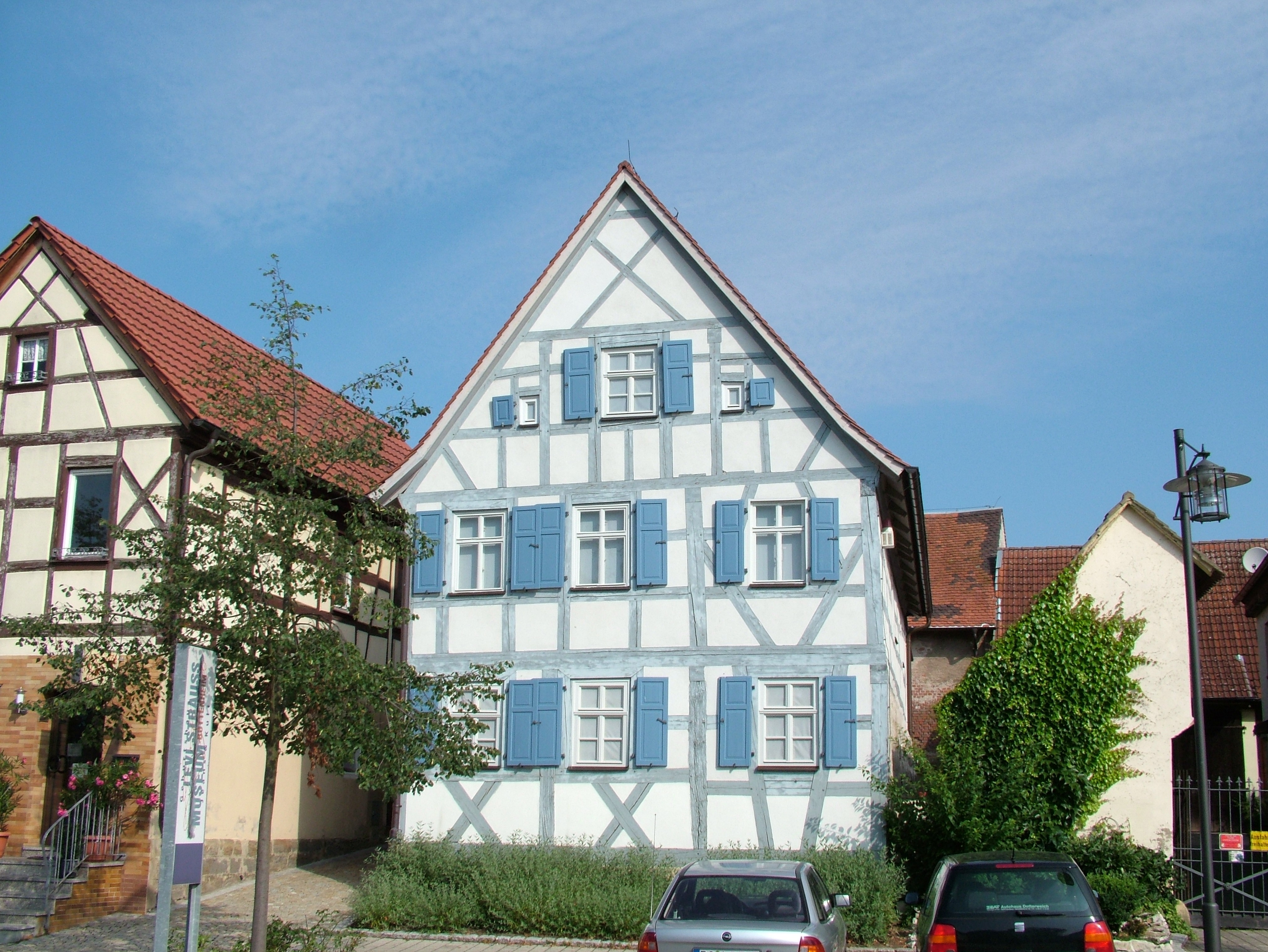
Birthplace of Levi Strauss

Levi Strauss was born to a Jewish family in Buttenheim on February 26, 1829, in the Franconia region of the Kingdom of Bavaria in the German Confederation. His parents were Hirsch Strauss and Rebecca Strauss (née Haas).

In 1847, aged 18, Strauss travelled with his mother and two sisters to the United States to join his brothers Jonas and Louis, who had begun a wholesale dry goods business in New York City called J. Strauss Brother & Co., at 108 Liberty Street in Manhattan. After arriving in New York, Strauss worked as an itinerant peddler of goods from his brother's store: kettles, blankets and sewing goods.

== Business career ==
Levi's sister Fanny and her husband David Stern moved to St. Louis, Missouri, while Levi went to live in Louisville, Kentucky, and sold his brothers' supplies there. Levi became an American citizen in January 1853.

The family decided to open a West Coast branch of their dry goods business in San Francisco, which was the commercial hub of the California gold rush. Levi was chosen to represent them, and he took steamships for San Francisco via Panama, where he arrived in early March 1854 and joined his sister's family.

Strauss opened his wholesale business as Levi Strauss & Co. and imported fine dry goods from his brothers in New York, including clothing, bedding, combs, purses, and handkerchiefs. He made tents and later jeans while he lived with Fanny's growing family. Tailor Jacob W. Davis of Reno, Nevada, was one of his customers; in 1871, having invented a way to strengthen work pants using rivets, he went into business with Strauss to mass-produce them. The next year, Davis asked Strauss to help him apply for a patent, and the patent (one-half assigned to Levi Strauss & Co.) was issued in 1873.

== Death ==
Levi Strauss was never married, and died on September 26, 1902 in San Francisco. His estate was worth about $30 million (equivalent to $877 million in 2024). Levi's nephew Sigmund Stern's only child, Elise Fanny Stern, married Walter A. Haas, the son of Abraham Haas, whose descendants are the current owners of Levi Strauss & Co.

== Dramatizations ==
In 1960, the anthology series television series Death Valley Days broadcast "The Million Dollar Pants", in which Strauss travels to San Francisco and establishes his business. The episode featured a likely fictional romantic interest, Yvonne Benet. In addition, the episode portrayed a likely fictional character, Patrick Mahoney, that was substituted for Jacob W. Davis.

In 2025, German broadcaster ARD released a series focusing on the life of Strauss called, "Levi Strauss und der Stoff der Träume" (the release title in the US is "Call Me Levi"), in which Vincent Redetzki portrays Strauss.

== Legacy ==
Levi Strauss, a member of the Reform branch of Judaism, helped establish Congregation Emanu-El, the first Jewish synagogue in the city of San Francisco. He also gave money to several charities, including special funds for orphans. The Levi Strauss Foundation started with an 1897 donation to the University of California, Berkeley, that provided the funds for 28 scholarships.

The Levi Strauss museum in Buttenheim, Germany is located in the 1687 house where Strauss was born. There is also a visitors center at Levi Strauss & Co. headquarters in San Francisco, which features historical exhibits.

In 1994, he was inducted into the Hall of Great Westerners of the National Cowboy & Western Heritage Museum.
