= Abraham Haas =

American businessman (1847–1921)

- Born: 1847; Reckendorf, Kingdom of Bavaria
- Died: August 8, 1921 (aged 74)
- Burial place: Home of Peace Cemetery (Colma, California)
- Occupation: Businessman
- Known for: Co-founder, Hellman, Haas & Co.
- Spouse: Fanny Koshland
- Children: Walter A. Haas Sr. Charles Haas; Ruth Haas Lilienthal; Eleanor Haas Koshland
- Family: Simon Koshland (father-in-law); Kalman Haas (cousin)

Abraham Haas (1847 – August 8, 1921) was an American businessman, co-founder of Hellman, Haas & Co. (later Haas, Baruch & Co., which ultimately merged with Smart & Final), and patriarch of the Haas family, the primary shareholders of Levi Strauss & Co.

== Biography ==
Haas was born to a Jewish family in Reckendorf, Kingdom of Bavaria in 1847 and immigrated to Portland, Oregon at the age of 16 where he worked at a grocery store founded by his cousins, Charles, Samuel, and Kalman Haas. He then moved to Los Angeles where he co-founded the retail drug and grocery store, Hellman, Haas & Co. with his brother, Jacob Haas, and partners, Herman W. Hellman (brother of banker Isaias W. Hellman) and Bernard Cohn (later the Mayor of Los Angeles). Using his profits, he founded the first flour milling and cold storage businesses in Los Angeles, the Capital Milling Company, as well as several electricity and gas companies. In the 1880s, Jacob Baruch, married to Haas's niece Jeanette Weiler, and his brother Herman Baruch, also married to a niece, Jeanette Meertief, bought out the other partners and the company changed its name to Haas, Baruch & Co. in 1889. The company pioneered the "cash & carry" concept in Los Angeles (before, clerks would gather the groceries for the customers) and by 1895, benefiting from rapid population growth in the region thanks to the building of the Los Angeles aqueduct, the discovery of oil in Long Beach, and the opening of the Panama Canal, the company had $2 million in sales. Haas became one of the leading philanthropists in the city at the time. He moved to San Francisco in 1900 where he founded Haas Wholesale Grocers and was a director for Wells Fargo Bank, the San Francisco Savings & Loan Company, the California Insurance League, and the Union Sugar Company.

Haas was a benefactor of the Eureka Benevolent Society (later the Jewish Family Service), the Federation of Jewish Charities, and the Pacific Orphans’ Asylum and Home Society.

== Personal life ==
Abraham Haas married Fanny Koshland, a daughter of Simon Koshland, one of the leading wool merchants in San Francisco, with whom he had four children: Charles Haas (1888-?), Walter A. Haas Sr. (1889-1979) (married Elise Fanny Stern, daughter of Sigmund Stern, a nephew of Levi Strauss, and granddaughter of David Stern), Ruth Haas Lilienthal (1891-1975) (married Philip N. Lilienthal Jr., son of banker Philip N. Lilienthal and grandson of rabbi Max Lilienthal), and Eleanor Haas Koshland (1900-1959) (married her cousin Daniel E. Koshland Sr., the son of her maternal uncle, Marcus Koshland).
