= History of the Jews in St. Louis =

The history of Jews in St Louis goes back to at least 1807. St. Louis has the largest Jewish population in Missouri and is the largest urban area in the state of Missouri. Today's Jewish community is primarily composed of the descendants of Jews who immigrated from Germany in the first few decades of the 19th century, as well as Jews who came from Eastern Europe slightly later.

== Early Jewish history of St. Louis ==
Commonly considered the pioneer Jew of St. Louis was Wolf Bloch, a native of Schwihau, Bohemia, who is reported to have settled there in 1816.

The earliest evidence of a Jew settling in St. Louis is that of Joseph Philipson from Pennsylvania. He arrived in St. Louis in the early winter of 1807. On December 13, 1807, Joseph, 34 years old, opened his general merchandising store and permanently settled in St. Louis. Joseph was not only the first Jewish merchant to settle in St. Louis, he was also the first American merchant to establish a permanent store in St. Louis. In 1808, Joseph's brother Jacob arrived in St. Louis and established his own store. Their remaining brother Simon remained in Philadelphia, traveling occasionally to St. Louis. Until 1816 the Philipsons were the only Jews known to live in St. Louis. Jacob died about 1858, buried in the City Cemetery. [Source : "The Philipsons"]

== The first synagogue ==
The early arrivals were not religiously observant and probably intermarried and in this way may have lost their identity; for it was not until the Jewish New Year of 1836 that the first religious services were held, when ten men rented a little room over Max's Grocery and Restaurant, on the corner of Second and Spruce Streets (now occupied by the St. Louis Arch Grounds). The next year these pioneers organized the United Hebrew Congregation, which is still in existence. According to Jonathan Sarna, it is the oldest synagogue west of the Mississippi River. A. Weigel was its first president; and services were held for many years at a private house in Frenchtown. The first building used as a synagogue was located on Fifth Street between Green and Washington Avenues. In 1855 this organization bought a site and erected its own temple on Sixth Street between Locust and St. Charles streets. The building was consecrated on June 17, 1859, with Rabbi M. J. Raphall of New York officiating. The rabbinate was held by Rabbi Henry J. Messing from 1878 to 1911.

The B'nai El congregation was organized in 1852, and moved into its own house of worship at Sixth and Cerre streets in 1855. Rabbi Moritz Spitz, editor of The Jewish Voice, was the occupant of its pulpit in from approximately 1880–1920.

In 1866 Congregation Shaare Emeth was organized on 17th and Pine, with Rabbi S. H. Sonnenschein as its spiritual leader, and Alexander Suss as its first president. Rabbis James M. Bennett and Andrea Goldstein are the present clergy. In 1886 a number of the members, being dissatisfied, banded together, and with Rabbi Sonnenschein organized Congregation Temple Israel, with Isaac Schwab as president. Rabbi Amy Feder and Rabbi Michael Alper are the present spiritual advisers. There are also six regularly organized Orthodox congregations in the city.

== Cemeteries ==
In 1844 A. J. Latz purchased a lot on Pratte Avenue for a cemetery, which was used until 1856, when the United Hebrew Congregation acquired what is now known as Mount Olive Cemetery. The B'nai El congregation used as its first burial-ground a plot of land on Gravois road, now enlarged and known as Mount Sinai Cemetery. This land was purchased in 1849. Later the Mt. Sinai Cemetery Association was formed, and the cornerstone of its chapel was laid June 22, 1873, the Revs. Wolfenstein and Sonnenschein officiating. The members of B'nai El, Shaare Emeth, and Temple Israel congregations are entitled to burial in these grounds.

== United Hebrew Relief Association ==
After the Chicago fire in 1871 many Jewish families removed from that city to St. Louis; and these required temporary assistance. It was then that the United Hebrew Relief Association was inaugurated, with B. Singer as president, and Rabbi S. Wolfenstein (later superintendent of the Cleveland Orphan Asylum) as vice-president. Numerous charitable organizations sprang up from time to time until 1897, when the first consolidation was effected. The United Hebrew Relief Association, the Sisterhood of Personal Service, the Ladies' Zion Society, and the Hebrew Ladies' Sewing Society combined, with a view to more effective work, under the name "United Jewish Charities," with Moses Fraley as president.

The Hebrew Free and Industrial School Society, an organization for the instruction of children in Jewish history and religion, was founded by Rabbi Henry J. Messing in 1879, with J. B. Greensfelder as president; and the Jewish Alliance Night-School for immigrants was established a few years later by Prof. W. Deutsch, and was presided over by Elias Michaels.

The Home for Aged and Infirm Israelites was founded in 1882, with B. Hysinger at its head. In 1905, it owned the property which it occupied, and provided for about fifty residents.

== Jewish Hospital ==
The United Jewish Charities being in need of funds in 1898, a large fair was held for one week in the Coliseum of the Exposition Building, under the auspices of a special committee presided over by Julius Lesser, with the result that the Charities received the sum of $37,000, one-half of which was appropriated toward the relief fund, while the remainder was used for erecting a building to be used by the Jewish charitable and educational bodies of St. Louis. The title to this building is vested in the United Jewish Charitable and Educational Associations, the first president of which is Elias Michaels.

Realizing the need of a hospital for the poor, the Jews of St. Louis contributed a fund of $100,000, which was paid to The Jewish Hospital of St. Louis, incorporated in 1900, and presided over by August Frank. The hospital was moved to the eastern edge of Forest Park in 1927. It was located at 5414 Delmar Boulevard. This placed it within two blocks of Barnes Hospital, and in 1996 the two hospitals merged to become Barnes-Jewish Hospital. This is now the largest hospital in Missouri.

The spirit of consolidation which was prevalent during the year 1901 affected those Jews who were interested in the several charitable and educational institutions of the city, and who believed that by a stronger union more work could be accomplished and larger contributions secured. Accordingly, on November 7, 1901, a committee of 100 persons assembled at the Columbian Club, and it was decided to organize the Jewish Charitable and Educational Union, with Moses Fraley as president. Over $42,000 a year is paid into its treasury by the Jews of St. Louis and distributed among the following constituent societies: the United Jewish Charities, Jewish Hospital, Home for Aged and Infirm Israelites, Hebrew Free and Industrial School Society, and Jewish Alliance Night-School Society. Annual appropriations are made also for the Cleveland Orphan Asylum and for the Hospital for Consumptives at Denver.

The first national Conference of Jewish Charities was held at St. Louis in 1885, with Marcus Bernheimer as president and Albert Arnstein as secretary.

== Newspapers and educational institutions ==
St. Louis had two Jewish papers in 1905. The Jewish Voice, successor to The Jewish Tribune, was founded in 1876 by Godlove, Friedman, and Wolfner. The Revs. S. H. Sonnenschein and Moritz Spitz later became joint owners of the paper, which wa eventually edited and owned by the latter. In 1901 The Modern View, owned and edited by A. Rosenthal, made its first appearance.

The Hebrew Young Men's Literary Association, which in a few years became the YMHA of St. Louis, began its existence in 1877, with J. B. Greensfelder as president. This organization in 1878 appointed a committee to solicit funds and distribute them among those refugees who were coming to St. Louis on account of the spread of yellow fever in the Southern States. Benjamin Altheimer was chairman of this committee. The YMHA maintained its literary and social work for a number of years, but it gradually passed out of existence. In 1896 it was reorganized, with A. Rosenthal as its new president; as of 1905 it had 600 members. The reorganized association took the lead in providing aid for the Romanian refugees in 1900. The Pioneers Ladies' Literary Society is the oldest organization of its kind in the country, having begun its work in 1877. Mrs. August Frank was its first president.

The Jews of St. Louis are fully identified with the welfare of the city. Isaac Schwab, Jonathan Rice, Jacob J. Wertheimer, Elias Michaels, Nathan Frank, and Charles A. Stix were members of the board of directors of the Louisiana Purchase Exposition Company, under whose auspices the World's Fair was held in St. Louis during the year 1904.

Among the Jews of St. Louis who have held positions of honor and trust in the community and have been prominent in the different public exchanges of the city may be mentioned: Nathan Frank, owner of the St. Louis Star, a daily newspaper, who represented the city in Congress; Moses N. Sale, a judge of the Circuit Court; Albert Arnstein and Moses Fraley, former members of the city council; Meyer Rosenblatt, who served as collector of revenue for the city; Louis Aloe, a member of the board of election commissioners; Elias Michaels, a member of the school board, and at one time president of the Mercantile Club; Marcus Bernheimer, a former president of the Merchants' Exchange; and Jacob D. Goldman, who has held the same office in the Cotton Exchange.

By 1905 the Jews of St. Louis numbered about 40,000 in a total population of about 575,000.

Today's Jewish population in the St. Louis area exceeds 60,000 in a metropolitan population of about 3,000,000 people.

St. Louis County, MO holds nearly all of Missouri's Jewish community. 7% of St. Louis County's population is Jewish.

Synagogues and community organizations including The Rohr Jewish Learning Institute are active in St. Louis.

== Antisemitism ==
On October 8, 1977, white supremacist Joseph Paul Franklin hid in bushes near the Brith Sholom Kneseth Israel synagogue, shooting 3 Jewish people exiting Sabbath services. He shot and killed Gerald Gordon, a 42-year-old man, and wounded two others.

== Other prominent Jewish people from St. Louis ==
- Jacob Lampert was a wealthy cigar manufacturer who lived in St. Louis. In 1912, he was Grand Master of the Masons in St. Louis. At the time of his death in 1921, he had the largest estate in the history of Missouri. His will was bitterly contested by eleven nephews and nieces, which was front-page news in the St. Louis Post-Dispatch newspaper.
- Lee Falk creator of the comic strip characters the Phantom (often considered the first modern superhero) and Mandrake the Magician was born and raised in St. Louis.
- Joe Besser comic actor on film and television
- Danny Meyer New York restaurateur.
- Sam Altman Entrepreneur and Venture Capitalist. CEO of OpenAI. Past President of Y Combinator.
- Andy Cohen Creator of Bravo Real Housewives franchise. He attended Clayton High School and now resides in New York City.
- Claire Saffitz food writer, chef, and YouTube personality.

== See also ==
- Jewish American
- Jewish history in the United States (pre-20th century)
- List of Jewish Americans
