= Messing (surname) =

Messing is a surname:

== People ==
- Aaron J. Messing (1840–1916), German-American rabbi
- Andreas Messing (born 1987), Swedish motorcyclist
- Asher Messing (born 1947), Israeli former football manager
- Debra Messing (born 1968), American actress
- Emma Messing (1872–1950), American secretary and vaudeville performer
- Henry J. Messing (1847–1913), German-American rabbi
- Jerry Messing (born 1986), American actor
- Joachim Messing (1946–2019), American biologist
- Karen Messing (born 1943), Canadian geneticist and ergonomist
- Keegan Messing (born 1992), American figure skater
- Laura Messing (born 1953), Argentine artist
- Marla Messing (born 1960), American attorney and sports executive
- Mayer Messing (1843–1930), German-American rabbi
- Roy Messing (born 1958), American former soccer goalkeeper
- Shep Messing (born 1949), American former soccer player
- Solomon Messing, American researcher and data scientist
- Stanislav Messing, full name Stanislav Adamovich Messing, (1890, Warsaw - September 2, 1937, Moscow), served as a Soviet party and state functionary, and as one of the leaders of the Soviet state security and intelligence bodies. Member of the Central Control Commission of the CPSU(b) between 1930 and 1934.
- Susan Messing (born 1963), American actress, comedian and author
- Ulrica Messing (born 1968), Swedish former politician
- William Messing, American mathematician
- Wolf Messing (1899–1974), Russian alleged psychic and telepathist
