= Henry A. Henry =

British-American rabbi

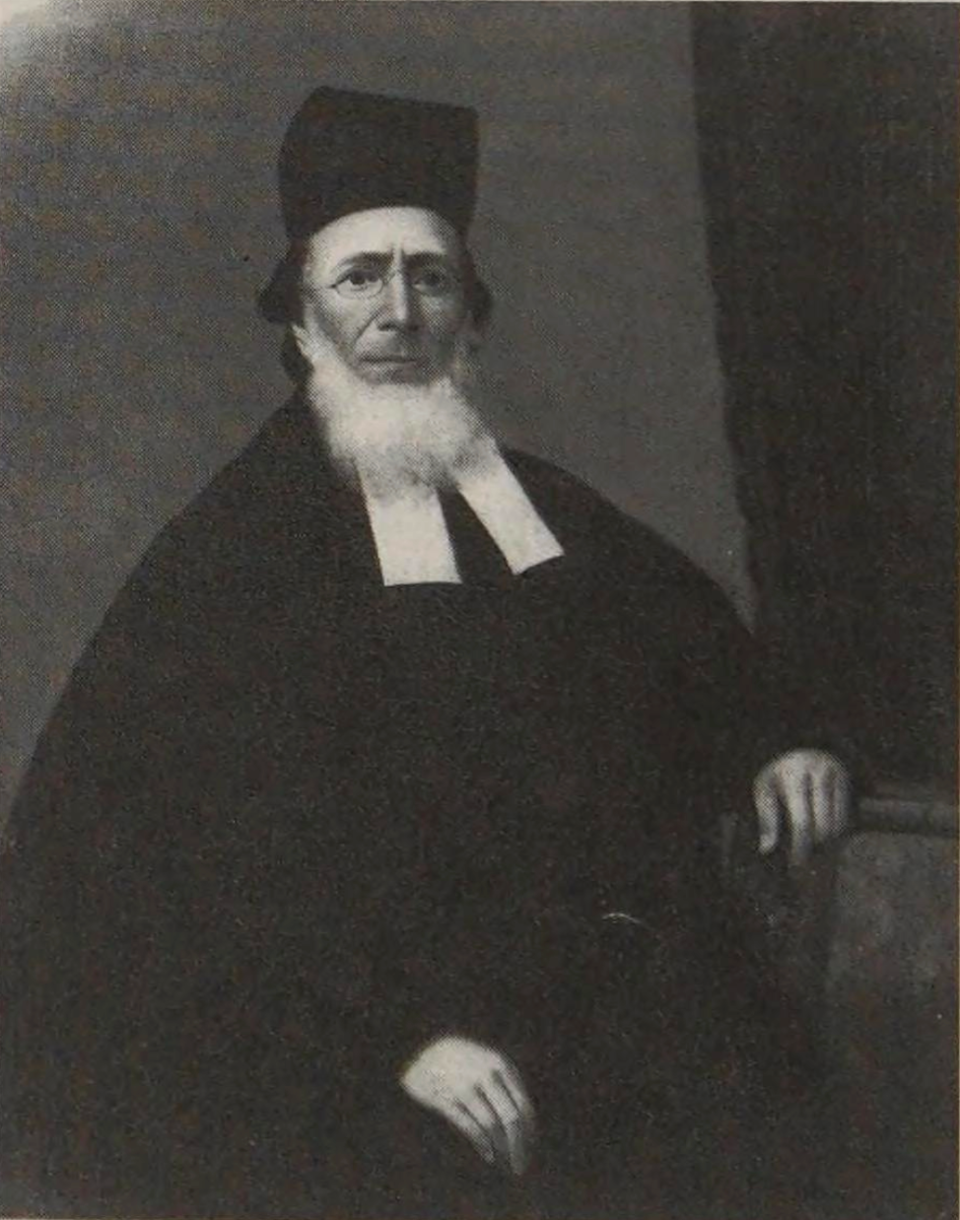
- Portrait of Henry, formerly held at the Western Jewish History Center

Personal life
- Born: c. 1800 London, England, United Kingdom
- Died: August 28, 1879 (aged 80) San Francisco, California, United States
- Buried: Hills of Eternity Memorial Park
- Spouse: Esther Simmons (died 1843); Sarah Meyers (m. 1847; died 1861)

Religious life
- Religion: Judaism
- Denomination: Orthodox Judaism
- Synagogue: Congregation Shearith Israel
- Position: Rabbi
- Began: 1857
- Ended: 1871

Henry Abraham Henry (Hebrew: צבי בן אברהם הענרי; c. 1800 – August 28, 1879) (Note: Henry's year of birth is disputed. His matzevah records him as 80 at the time of death, suggesting 1798 or 1799 as birth year. The Jewish Encyclopedia states he was born in 1800, while Appletons' Cyclopædia of American Biography gives 1801. A contemporary article reports that he celebrated his 70th birthday on November 3, 1871, which would also indicate a birth year of 1801. Meanwhile, an article in The Jewish Chronicle gives his date of birth as 19 Marcheshvan 5567 (October 31, 1806).) was a British-American rabbi, educator, and Hebraist. He was the first Orthodox rabbi to serve the American West.

== Biography ==
=== Early life and career ===
Henry A. Henry was born in London around 1800 to Jewish parents Fanny and Abraham Henry. His family was likely of Prussian Polish origin. Among his relatives was Rabbi Morris Joseph. He was educated at the Jews' Free School, and received rabbinic ordination from Rabbi Solomon Hirschell.

Henry served as tutor for the Rothschild family, and led the Jews' Free School as headmaster from 1832 until 1842. He frequently officiated in London synagogues while headmaster, and in 1844 became rabbi of the St. Alban's Congregation, where he remained until 1849. During his tenure, he introduced regular English-language sermons, then a novel practice.

Henry became a prominent figure in London's Jewish community, particularly noted for his resistance to the efforts of the Society for the Conversion of the Jews. He was one of the founders of the Jews' Hospital and Orphan Asylum, and was Past Master of the Lodge of Israel no. 247.

=== Life in the United States ===
In 1849 Henry emigrated to the United States, bringing with him an extensive library of Jewish books. While he intended to serve the Jewish community of Louisville, Kentucky, he was delayed in Cincinnati and accepted instead a position at the B'nai Jeshurun Synagogue that September. He resigned from the position in July 1851, moving to Syracuse, New York, where he served as rabbi for three years. Though himself Orthodox, Henry delivered a sermon at the Reform Temple Emanu-El in New York City in September 1851, leading to him being banned from the then-Orthodox Congregation Shaaray Tefila. In 1854, Henry moved to New York City, where he resided until 1857. There he served the Henry Street Congregation and later the Clinton Street Synagogue. During this period, he also superintended a religious school and established a boarding school for Jewish children.

In 1857, he relocated to San Francisco, California, to serve as rabbi of Congregation Shearith Israel. He assumed emeritus status in September 1869.

=== Death and legacy ===
Henry was disabled by illness for the last eight years of his life. He died in San Francisco on August 28, 1879, and is buried at the Hills of Eternity Memorial Park. Rabbi Henry Vidaver delivered a eulogy at his funeral. His library, containing some 2,000 volumes, was acquired by the Hebrew Union College in Cincinnati.

== Works ==
In 1836 Henry compiled a volume of daily prayers according to the German and Polish rites, which enjoyed "a wide reputation for its completeness and careful compilation." He published A Class Book for Jewish Youth of Both Sexes in 1839 and the two-part Synopsis of Jewish History in 1859.

While in California he edited the English portion of the periodical The Pacific Messenger. Henry was also a frequent contributor to various American Jewish journals. Writing under a pseudonym, Henry was highly critical of Julius Eckman, another early rabbi of San Francisco, for his numerous violations of Jewish laws on marriage.

=== Selected publications ===
- Henry, H. A. (1835). Daily Prayers, According to the Custom of the German and Polish Jews. London: John Wertheimer.
- Henry, H. A. (1836). The Daily Fasts and Feasts, According to the German and Polish Ritual. London: Wertheimer.
- Henry, H. A. (1837). Form of Prayers and Thanksgiving for Women Attending Synagogue After Childbirth. London: E. Justin and Son. With N. I. Vallentine. 2nd edition, 1845.
- Henry, H. A. (1839). A Class Book for Jewish Youth of Both Sexes. London: H. A. Henry. 2nd edition, 1866.
- Henry, H. A. (1845). A Series of Six Discourses on the Principles of Belief of Israel. London: H. A. Henry.
- Henry, H. A. (1845). Religious Belief of Israel as Productive of Human Happiness and Moral Improvement.
- Henry, H. A. (1850). Antiquity of Freemasonry in General. Cincinnati: German Republican Office.
- Henry, H. A. (June 21, 1850). "Prayer for the Government". The Asmonean. p. 6 – via Open Siddur Project.
- Henry, H. A. (1859). A Synopsis of Jewish History from the Return of the Jews from the Babylonish Captivity, to the Days of Herod the Great. San Francisco: Towne & Bacon.
- Henry, H. A. (1864). Discourses on the Book of Genesis. San Francisco: H. H. Bancroft & Co.
- Hollaenderski, Léon (1865). The History of the Israelites of Poland. Translated by Henry, H. A. San Francisco: P. Jacoby.
