= Messing =

Messing may refer to:

- Messing, Essex, a village in Essex, England
- Messing (surname)

== See also ==
- Messing Around (disambiguation)
