= Isaac Leucht =

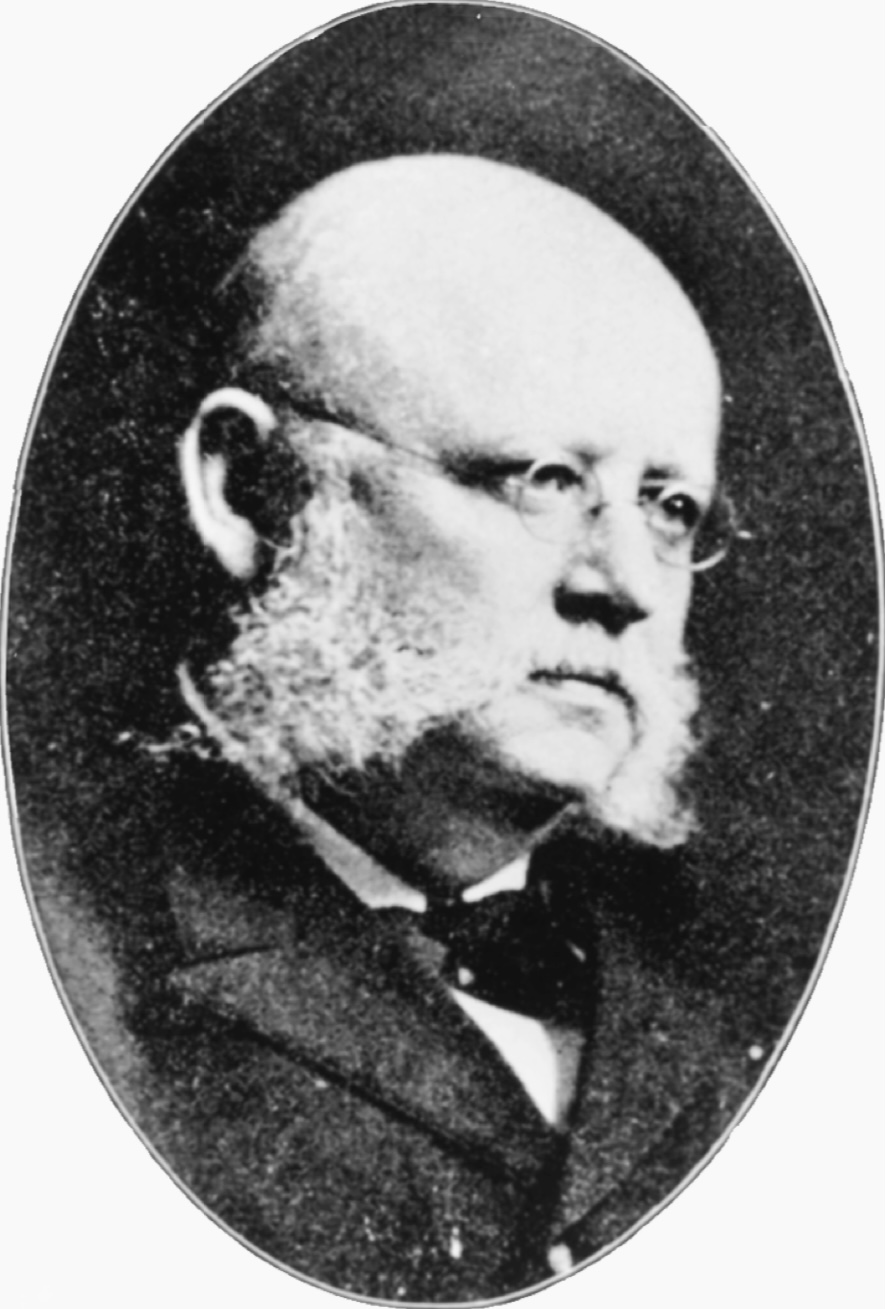

Isaac Leucht (1844 in Darmstadt, Hesse, Germany – 1916 in New Orleans, Louisiana) was a Reform Rabbi and communal leader in New Orleans. He was the last rabbi of Congregation Shangarai Chasset before it merged with Congregation Nefutzot Yehudah to become what is now the Touro Synagogue.

In 1868, Leucht arrived in New Orleans (from Baltimore) to serve as Shangarai Chasset's cantor. When James Gutheim, who was the rabbi at that time, left the synagogue to assume a position in New York, Leucht took over as the rabbi as well. He held those positions through 1872, when he left to become the cantor at Temple Sinai. After a yellow fever outbreak killed Shangarai Chasset's rabbi and cantor in 1879, Leucht returned to Shangarai Chasset. Two years later, Shangarai Chasset merged with Nefutzot Yehudah. Shortly thereafter, the synagogue was renamed in honor of their earlier shared benefactor Judah Touro.

Under Leucht's leadership the synagogue further adopted the innovations of Reform Judaism that Gutheim introduced. According to the Touro synagogue website, in 1881, the second-day observance of the holidays was dropped; in 1889 Shabbat morning worship was abbreviated to "last not longer than one hour including the sermon"; in 1891 the congregation decided to allow worship with or without covered heads, depending on how long one had been a member. It was also in that year that the synagogue joined the Union of American Hebrew Congregations.

Leucht was active in the New Orleans community serving on the board of Jewish institutions such as the Association for the Relief of Jewish Widows and Orphans, as well being a member of the State's first Board of Education in 1888. The Jewish Community of New Orleans credits Leucht for his ecumenical ties to the non-Jewish community, also listing his service as president of the Louisiana Red Cross, and Commission of Prisons and Asylums as examples. Along those lines, he contributed an article entitled "The Mysteries of the Book of Esther" to The Southern Presbyterian Review. Regarding Leucht's Jewish communal work, his great grandson, Bill Rosen, in a nostalgic letter detailing his own departure from New Orleans after Hurricane Katrina, wrote that during his great-grandfather's years in New Orleans, Leucht "started or helped develop every major Jewish institution of his time - he built Touro Synagogue, laid the corner stone of Touro Infirmary and worked ten years to develop the Isidore Newman School," institutions that continue to service New Orleans.

Leucht's brother Joseph also found employment as a rabbi and cantor, first in Baltimore's Hebrew Congregation, where his father-in-law, Rabbi Abraham Rice was rabbi, then later as rabbi of Temple Bnai Jeshurun in Newark, New Jersey.
