= Shangarai Chasset =

Former synagogue in New Orleans, U.S

Religion
- Affiliation: Judaism (1827–1881): Orthodox; Reform
- Rite: Nusach Sefard
- Ecclesiastical or organisational status: Synagogue (1845–1881)
- Status: Abandoned

Location
- Location: New Orleans, Louisiana
- Country: United States

Architecture
- Established: 1827 (as a congregation)
- Completed: 1845

Shangarai Chasset, also called Shaarei Chesed, was an Orthodox and later, Reform, Jewish congregation and synagogue, located in New Orleans, Louisiana, in the United States. The congregation worshipped in the Sefardi rite.

== History ==
Shangarai Chasset was founded in New Orleans on December 20, 1827, and chartered by the Louisiana legislature on March 27, 1828, by Jacob Solis. The synagogue's members were primarily of Sephardic Portuguese background. Around the same time the synagogue was founded, a related benevolent society was established with the same name, "Shaare Chessed," (the first interment therein was that of a Hyam Harris on June 28, 1828). Though Judah Touro was not initially interested in the congregation, he eventually gave generously to it.

The congregation constructed a synagogue building in 1845 on Rampart Street between St. Louis and Conti Streets, the first permanent synagogue building in Louisiana. A plaque remains at the site.

By 1846, the Jewish population had become more French and German because of the migration of Jews from Alsace-Lorraine. As a result, a Sephardic businessman, Gershom Kursheedt, convinced Judah Touro to establish a new Sephardic synagogue which he did on the corner of Bourbon St. and Canal St. The new congregation was called Nefutsoth Judah, Dispersed of Judah. By 1881, the two congregations couldn't exist separately and re-united under the name of The Gates of Mercy of the Dispersed of Judah. In 1937, the congregation changed its name to Touro Synagogue in honor of their mutual benefactor.

Far from established Jewish communities, the congregation's membership attempted to create a semblance of Jewish life and community in the new territory opened to them as part of the Louisiana Purchase. Upon its founding, most Jewish people were reportedly indifferent and not affiliated with the synagogue. Of those affiliated with the congregation, their level of observance was minimal. Jacob Rader Marcus, a noted historian, comments that the lack of affiliation to the synagogue may have in part resulted in many of the Jewish men in the Louisiana Territory taking non-Jewish wives and having non-Jewish children. However, the high intermarriage rate did not preclude the congregation from appointing men with gentile wives to leadership positions in the synagogue. Despite shortcomings in their religious observance, their love of their religion, and service to their community was nonetheless noteworthy, as it paved the way for future generations of Jewish life in New Orleans.

== Rabbinical leadership ==
The following individuals served as rabbi of the congregation:

Ordinal	Name	Term start	Term end	Time in office	Notes
1	Manis Jacobs	1828	1839	10–11 years	
2	Albert "Roley" Marks	1839	1845	5–6 years	(Note: Evans writes that Marks was a "fake rabbi..." and a "ludicrous but likable part-time comic actor and fireman." It appears that Marks was appointed to lead the congregation primarily due to his ability to lead services. Historians Jonathan Sarna and Jacob Rader Marcus noted in various works that during that era most U.S. "rabbis" were not ordained; calling him a fake may have been too strong a critique of his pastoral abilities. Nonetheless, he is usually noted negatively, as sources cite that Marks was known to run out of services to assist his fire brigade, was not particularly careful with kosher laws or observance of Passover, and was married to a Catholic woman. Multiple sources including Evans cite a story about an incident in synagogue in which he argued with a congregant displeased with his conduct, during the High Holiday services. (Although not cited elsewhere, it is possible that the congregant objected to Marks' being appointed to lead the services, as halachic sources recommend a respectable individual represent the congregation for High Holiday services.) In response to the congregant, Marks reportedly "banged on the podium and screamed" unpleasantries at the congregant, asserting his "... right to pray!" Marks appears to have died sometime around 1850. Sources differ about his burial, but again, neither were favorable from a traditional Jewish standpoint. Some record the story that the rabbi’s widow, a Catholic, was restrained only with difficulty from putting a crucifix in (or on) his grave. Other sources cite that he returned to the northeast before his death, living in Philadelphia. Upon news of her father falling gravely ill, Marks’ daughter, Sarah Marks Stockton, living in Princeton, New Jersey had him baptized by her Episcopalian minister. His grave is located in Princeton, New Jersey.)
3	Ferdinand Hirsch	1845	?	1–2 years	
4	Dr. Hermann Kohlmeyer	1847	1850	2–3 years	
5	James Koppel Gutheim	1850	1853	2–3 years	
6	Joseph Levin	1855	1859	3–4 years	(Note: December, 1855: Reverend Jos. Levin is elected Rabbi. One Hundredth Anniversary of Touro Synagogue, 1828–1928)
7	Solomon Jacob	1859	1860	0–1 years	(Note: Also referred to as Jacobs, a native of London, England, Jacob was the rabbi and cantor through his death in 1860. Jacob also published a Jewish newspaper called the Cornerstone until his death. : The Occident noted a rabbi with a similar name as having been a leader of the Ashkenazi Jewish community in Kingston, Jamaica in various editions, (August 1846 and January and February 1851 to name a few) and it is possible that this was the same individual. The community members that later approached Rabbi Jacob's successor, Rabbi Illowy to determine the kosher status of the Muscovy duck, cited that the duck had been ruled to be a kosher bird by the rabbinic authorities in Jamaica. In the One Hundredth Anniversary of Touro Synagogue, 1828–1928, it is noted that in August, 1860, "Rev. Solomon Jacobs dies. Burial conducted by Rev. Herman Kohlmeyer.")
8	Dr. Yissochar Dov Bernard Illowy	1861	1865	3–4 years	
(5)	James Koppel Gutheim	1865	1868	2–3 years	
9	Isaac Leucht	1868	1872	3–4 years	
10	unknown				
(9)	Isaac Leucht	1879	1881	1–2 years	Congregation merged with the Nefutzot Yehudah

== See also ==
- Oldest synagogues in the United States
