= Hermann Kohlmeyer =

Hermann Kohlmeyer (1814 – 1883) was an American rabbi in charge of Congregation Shangarai Chasset in New Orleans, Louisiana.

On January 17, 1847, the synagogue board unanimously elected Kohlmeyer to serve as its leader. In the edition of The Occident and American Jewish Advocate that noted the appointment, Isaac Leeser praised Kohlmeyer as a worthy individual for the position, and expressed hope that Kohlmeyer would be successful.

Noted as a brilliant scholar and linguist, Rabbi Isaac Meyer Wise recommended Kohlmeyer to serve on the rabbinical committee that was to examine Wise's Minhag America Reform prayer book. But Kohlmeyer gave up his ministry for a career in education, becoming professor of Hebrew and Oriental Literature at the University of Louisiana (now Tulane University).

Although his service to the Jewish community seems to have been relatively short in length, it appears that his descendants remained in New Orleans, and have been prominent members of the New Orleans community since then.
