= History of the Jews in San Francisco =

Jewish community in San Francisco, CA

Jews in San Francisco
יהודים בסן פרנסיסקו
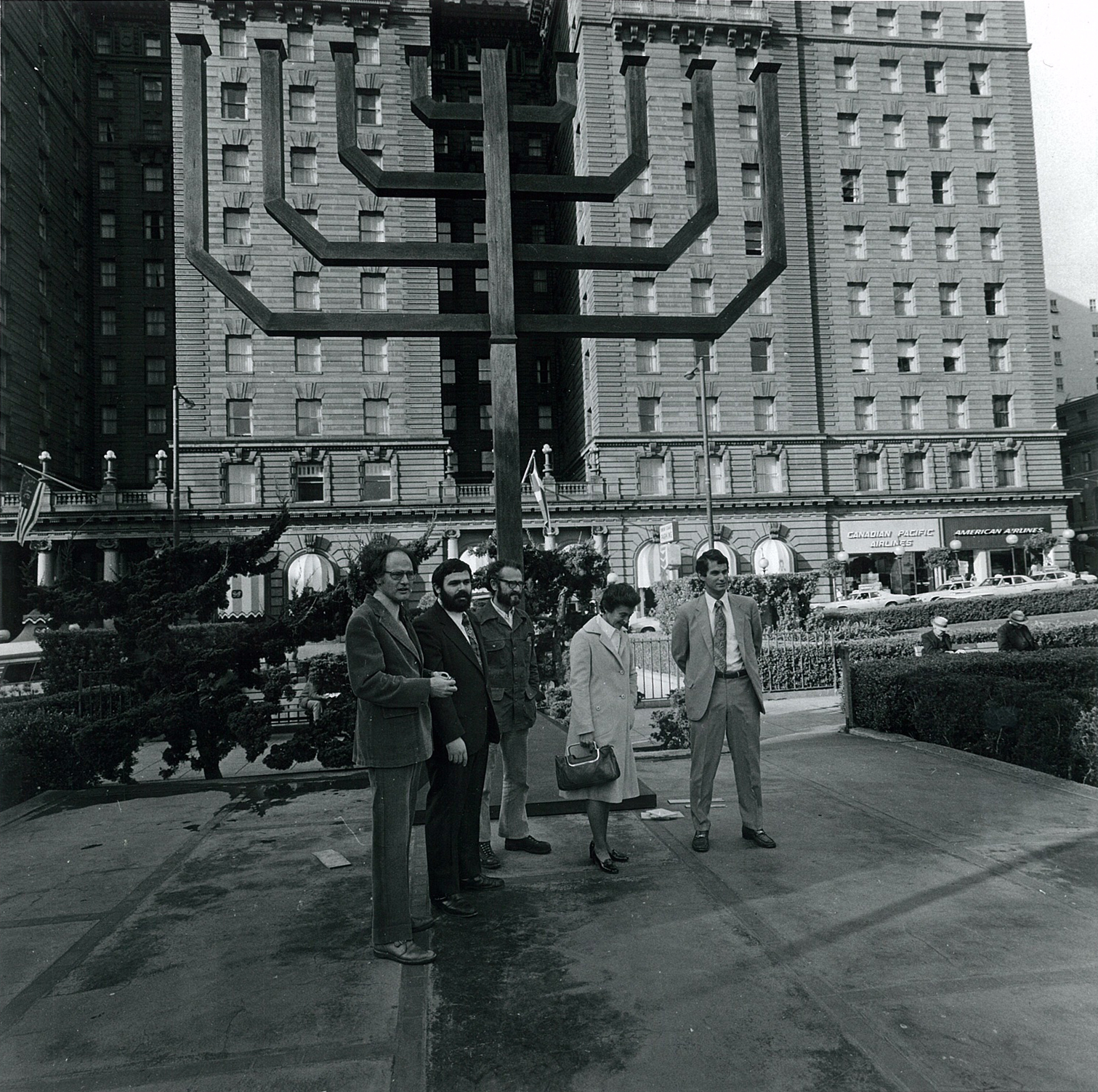
- Bill Graham Menorah in Union Square c. 1975

Total population
- 350,000

Languages
- American English, Hebrew, Yiddish, Russian

Religion
- Reform Judaism, Conservative Judaism, Orthodox Judaism, Reconstructionist Judaism, irreligious

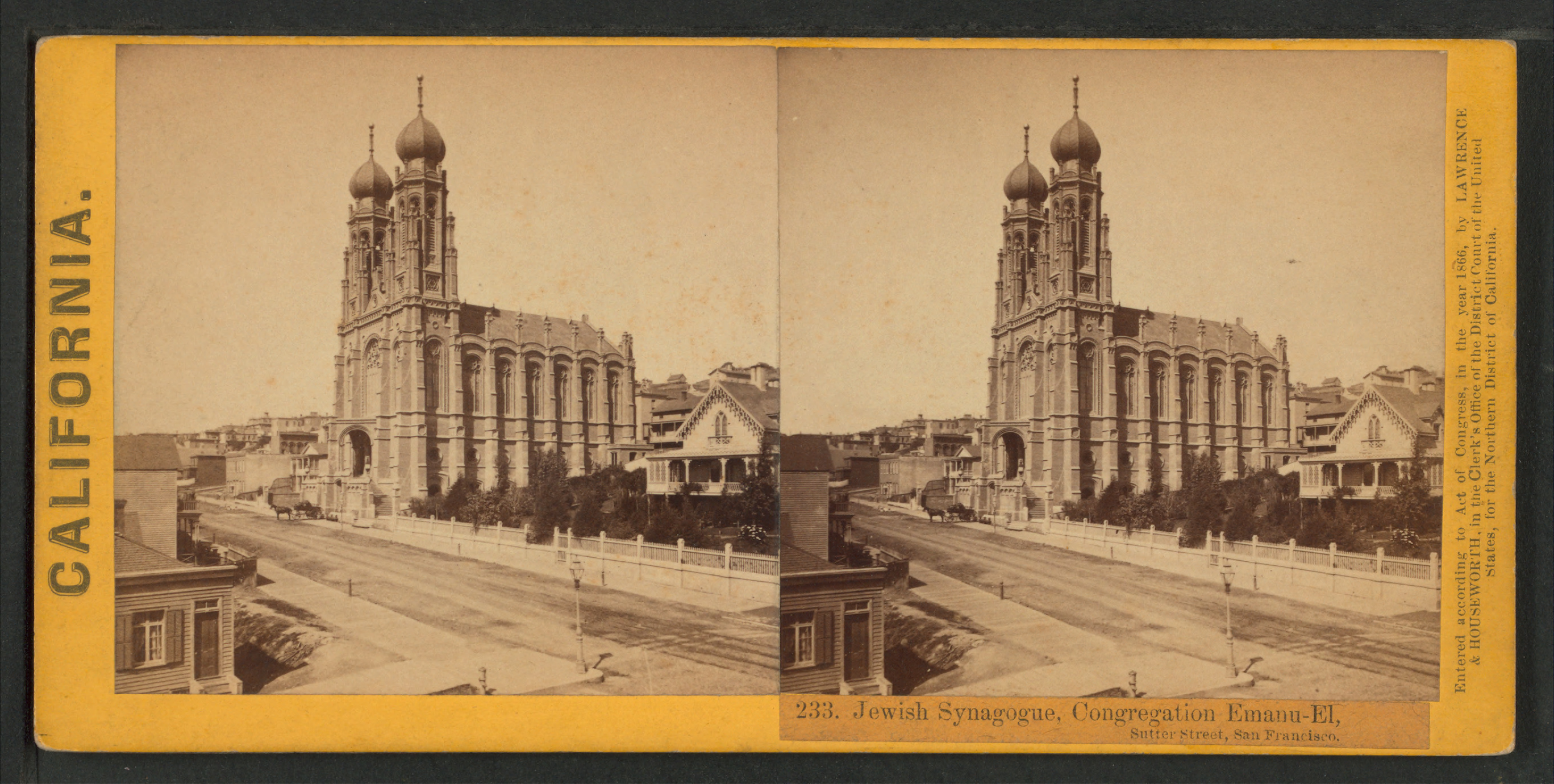
Congregation Emanu-El on Sutter Street (1866–1926), San Francisco

Jews compose approximately 4% of the San Francisco Bay Area population, making it the fourth largest Jewish population in the U.S. behind the New York area, southeast Florida and metropolitan Los Angeles.

The history of the Jews in San Francisco began with the California Gold Rush in the second half of the 19th century. Jewish San Franciscans played a significant role in the economic development of the city and have since had a significant impact on the culture of San Francisco.

In 2018, the largest Jewish denominations in the Bay Area were Reform and Conservative Judaism, with smaller Orthodox and Reconstructionist communities.

== History ==
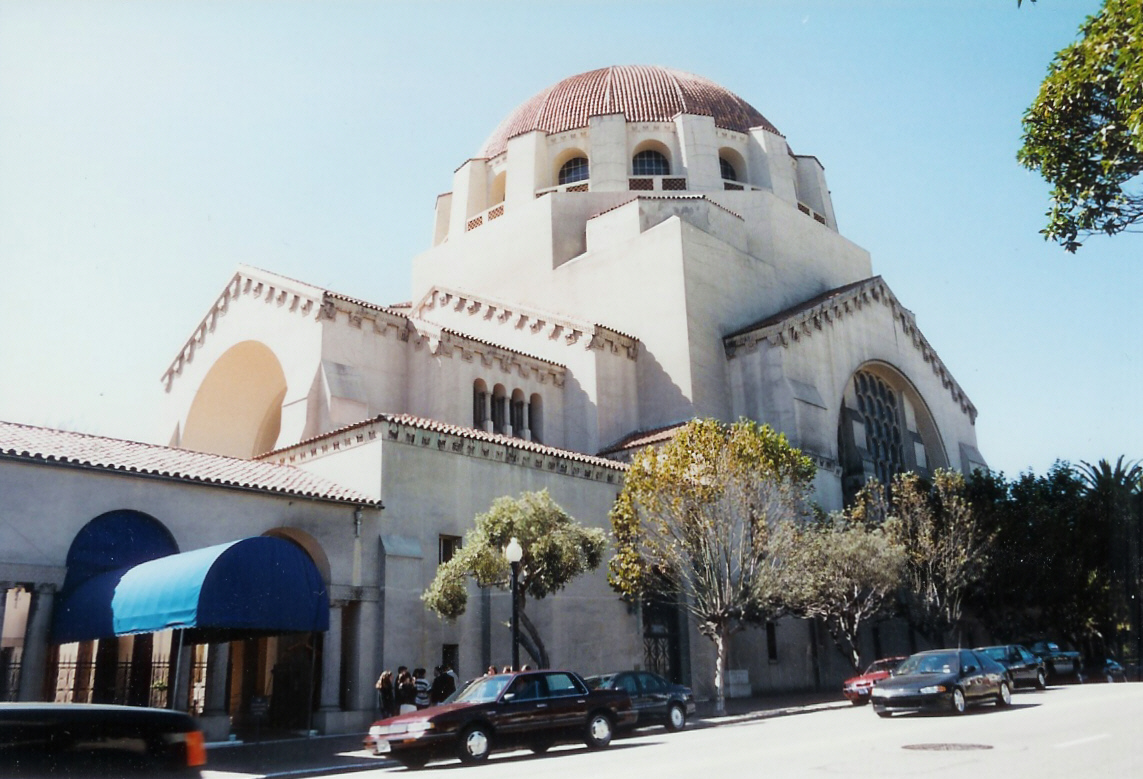
Congregation Emanu-El (2006) on Lake Street

=== 19th-century ===
The small Mexican settlement of Yerba Buena was renamed San Francisco in 1847 and quickly became the most important city in the American West. The discovery of gold in California in 1848 brought many people to San Francisco, including Jews. One of the first Jewish synagogues to be formed was the Congregation Sherith Israel, in 1849, which also constructed a cemetery. That same year, Congregation Emanu-El began as a minyan at Lewis Abraham Franklin's tent store on Jackson Street at Kearny Street, with 30 Jews from Poland, Prussia, Bavaria and the Eastern United States, and it was initially Orthodox.

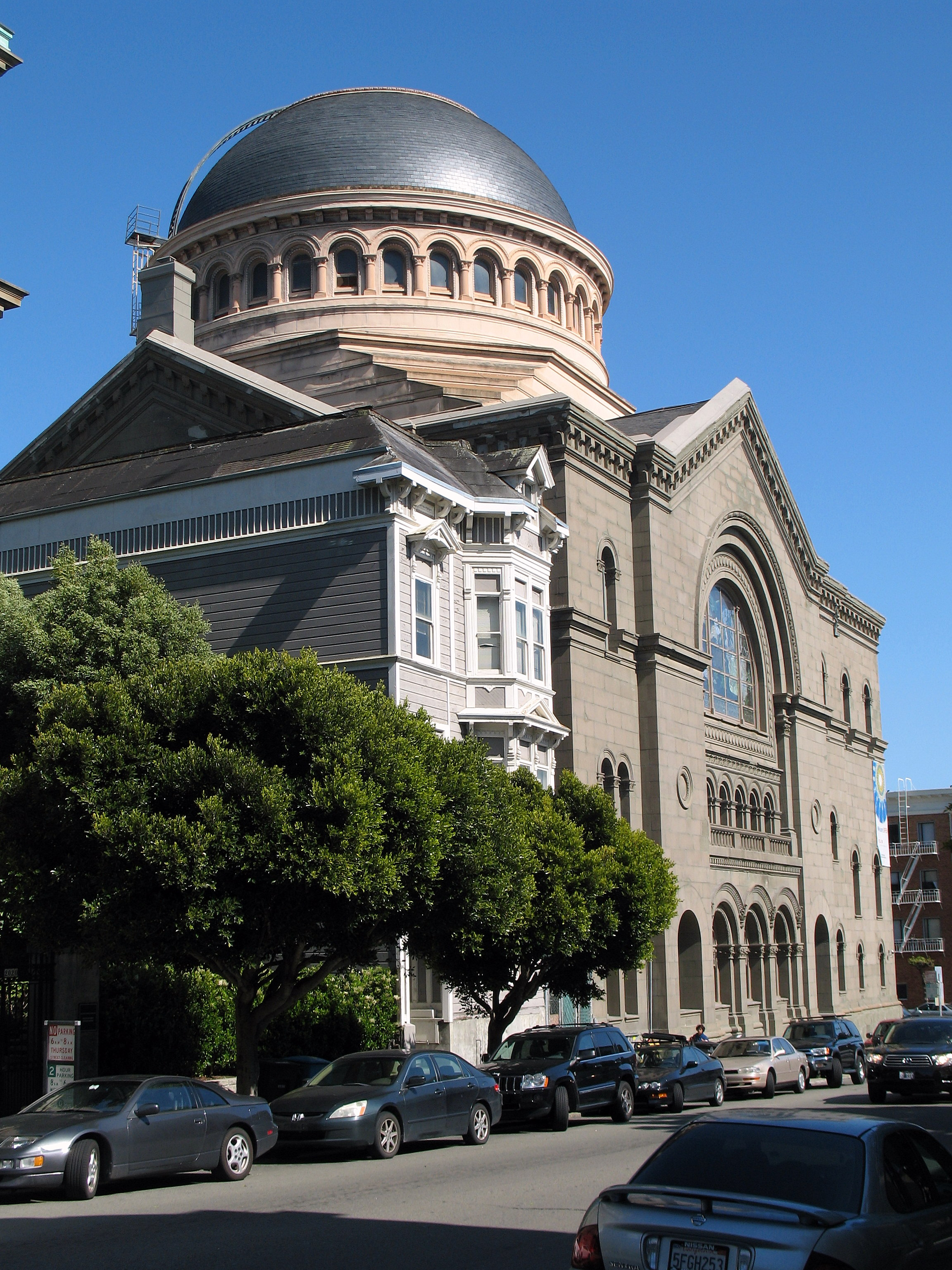
Temple Sherith Israel in 2011

In 1851, Congregation Emanu-El and Congregation Sherith Israel of San Francisco were joined as a single synagogue; but soon after they split into two congregations. Congregation Emanu-El was mostly Bavarian German immigrants, and Congregation Sherith Israel was mostly immigrants from Eastern Europe, Poland, and England.

San Francisco's Jewish population was the second largest Jewish community in the country by 1880.

Home of Peace Cemetery, also known as Navai Shalome, was established in 1889 for Congregation Emanu-El; and Hills of Eternity Memorial Park cemetery was established in 1889 for Congregation Sherith Israel. Both Jewish cemeteries were founded in San Francisco, and later moved to nearby Colma, California, which has a total of four Jewish cemeteries.

=== 20th-century ===
On April 18, 1906, an earthquake and subsequent fires devastated over 80% of San Francisco. The destruction affected all its citizens, including the nearly 30,000 Jews who lived in the city. A Jewish newspaper, Emanu-El, was the first weekly newspaper to get back into publication after the quake, which helped people find each other after the devastation.

The first Sephardic synagogue in San Francisco, Magain David Sephardim Congregation, was founded in 1935. The Synagogue's president wrote an article called "The Fate of European Jewry Hinges on the Turn of the Spanish Revolution" and the congregation hosted anti-fascist and anti-Nazi meetings.

The Jewish Community Center of San Francisco, originally founded as the Young Men's Hebrew Society in 1877, was formally incorporated in 1930. In the late 1930s, refugees arrived in San Francisco from Germany, Austria, Poland, Spain and Czechoslovakia, and the center offered them free memberships and English classes. By the 1950s, the JCCSF was "a polyglot mixture of people, activities, services and programing" whose members came from diverse cities across the United States and many other countries. Louis Blumenthal was its executive director from 1925 until his death in 1959, and his wife, Ema Loewy Blumenthal, its associate director from 1925 until her retirement in 1964.

In the 1950s and 1960s the Bay Area had been considered a "backwater of American Judaism", with the 100, 000 Jewish residents being largely secular and assimilated in the broader non-Jewish culture.

However, by the 1980s, the Bay Area was considered "the scene of a Jewish renaissance with a Californian twist", according to Perry Garfinkel a 1988 New York Times report, citing research from demographer Gary Tobin. The population had risen to 223,000, making up 3.3 percent of the total population.

The nonconformism of the local Jewish community also led to the establishment of organizations and congregations such as the Jewish Renewal communities, Aquarian Minyan (established in 1975), with New Age and Neo-Chassidic-style services and the Synagogue Without Walls, holding services in public parks and community centres.

The Jewish Theatre San Francisco (also known as A Traveling Jewish Theatre), a Jewish theatre company, was established in 1978.

In 1980, Deborah Kaufman founded the San Francisco Jewish Film Festival, Kaufman told The New York Times in a later interview that: "I wanted to express my Jewishness and my progressive politics and my cultural hipness at the same time. There was no venue like that at the time, so I had to invent one." Kaufman was able to draw a wide-ranging audience to include: "gay men, lesbians, vegetarian holistic Hasidics, Holocaust survivors, atheist Jews, leftists and scholars, among others." The enduring film festival has since become the world's oldest Jewish film festival.

In 1984, the Jewish Community Museum (later renamed the Contemporary Jewish Museum) was founded.

In 1986, Tikkun, a progressive Jewish magazine was founded in Oakland. by Michael Lerner and his then-wife, Nan Fink Gefen.

In the 1980s, thousands of Jewish refugees from Russia arrived in the city, and by 2021, they had started a Russian Jewish non-profit organization and purchased a building to be used as a community center.

=== 21st-century ===
A 2018 study on Jews in the ten counties comprising the San Francisco Bay Area said many Jews had left the city of San Francisco for other parts of the Bay Area, but that 17% of this population still lived in the city. The San Francisco Bay Area contains the 4th largest population of Jews in the United States, compared to other metropolitan areas. The Bay Area Jewish population is younger, more ethnically diverse, more educated, and more likely to be LGBTQ than Jews in other metropolitan areas.

The study also found that Reform is the dominant Jewish domination (37%), followed by Conservative (13%), and Orthodox and Reconstructionist (both at 3% each). 41% are unaffiliated with a specific denomination.

The study also found that 5% of respondents were born in the former Soviet Union and a further 3% in Israel.

In 2022, the University of San Francisco began displaying a new online exhibition "Mapping Jewish San Francisco". It is an attempt to tell the stories of Jewish subcommunities in the Bay Area, and was inspired by UCLA's project, “Mapping Jewish Los Angeles”.

== Notable Jewish people from San Francisco ==
=== Aaron Fleishhacker ===
Aaron Fleishhacker was a German-born American businessman who founded the San Francisco-based paper box manufacturer, "A. Fleishhacker & Co." Fleishhacker was also active during the Gold Rush with the formation of Comstock silver mines in Nevada. Fleishhacker was a founding member of Congregation Emanu-El in San Francisco and a local philanthropist. His son Herbert Fleishhacker continued his father's legacy.

=== Florence Prag Kahn ===
Florence Prag Kahn was the first Jewish woman to serve in the United States Congress for California's 4th district. Her family moved to San Francisco, California in 1869, when she was child. She graduated from the San Francisco Girls' High School, before attending University of California, Berkeley.

=== Julius Kahn ===
Julius Kahn was a United States Congressman in California's 4th district and served 12 terms, after his death his wife Florence served in his former office. He has been described by the American Jerusalem as "among the most influential Jews in San Francisco—as well as national–civic life, from the middle of the 19th century into the 1930s". Representative Kahn authored the Kahn Exclusion Act, ultimately enacted as the Chinese Exclusion Act, a United States federal law that prohibited all immigration of Chinese laborers.

=== Levi Strauss ===
Levi Strauss left New York for San Francisco in order to supply gold miners with sturdy denim pants. In 1853, Levi Strauss & Co. was founded as "David Stern & Levi Strauss" and was located at 90 Sacramento Street near to the docks of San Francisco. The world-renowned blue jeans were invented by Latvian Jew Jacob W. Davis and Levi Strauss, who patented their design in 1873.

=== Adolph Sutro ===
Adolph Sutro was the first Jewish mayor of San Francisco from 1895 until 1897. At one time Sutro owned one-twelfth of the acreage of San Francisco. He purchased the Cliff House in the early 1880s, and one thousand acres of land facing the ocean, now called Sutro heights. The Sutro Baths, located on the north side of Ocean Beach, south of the Golden Gate Bridge, opened as the world's largest indoor swimming complex in 1896.

=== Others ===
- Joseph Asher (1921–1990) German-born American rabbi
- Larry Baer (born 1957), businessman, president, and CEO of the San Francisco Giants
- Joseph Brandenstein (1826–1910), German-born American businessman
- Stephen Breyer (born 1938), U.S. Supreme Court justice from 1994 to 2022
- Lazarus Dinkelspiel (1824–1900), businessman
- B. J. Feigenbaum (1900–1984), lawyer, who served in the California legislature
- Dianne Feinstein (1933–2023), politician
- Katherine Feinstein (born 1957), attorney, public official, and former judge
- Donald Fisher (1928–2009), businessman and philanthropist
- Doris Feigenbaum Fisher (born 1931), businesswoman
- Rachel "Ray" Frank(1861-1948) religious leader
- Leon Goldman (1904–1975), physician
- Rhoda Haas Goldman (1924–1996), philanthropist
- Richard Goldman (1920–2010), businessman and philanthropist
- Evelyn Danzig Haas (1917–2010), civic leader and philanthropist
- Peter E. Haas (1918–2005), businessman
- Walter A. Haas Jr. (1916–1995), businessman
- Warren Hellman (1934–2011), investment banker and private equity investor
- Simon Koshland (1825–1896), Kingdom of Bavaria-born American businessman, and wool merchant
- Lawrence Kushner (born 1943), Reform rabbi and scholar
- Philip N. Lilienthal (1850–1908), American banker and philanthropist
- Bob Lurie (born 1929), real estate magnate and philanthropist, who owned San Francisco Giants baseball team
- Daniel Lurie (born 1977), politician and philanthropist, mayor of San Francisco
- Isaac Magnin (1842–1907), Dutch-born American businessperson, carver and gilder; co-founder of I. Magnin
- Martin A. Meyer (1879–1923), rabbi
- Harvey Milk (1930–1978), politician and San Francisco's first openly gay board of supervisor
- Louis Israel Newman (1893–1972) Reform rabbi and author.
- Raphael Peixotto (1837–1905), merchant
- Julie Rosewald (1847–1906), opera singer and cantor
- Abe Ruef (1864–1936), lawyer and politician, convicted of bribery
- Nell Sinton (1910–1997), painter
- Douglas W. Shorenstein (1955–2015), real estate developer, lawyer
- Selina Solomons (1862–1942) suffragist
- Theodore Solomons (1870–1947), explorer and early member of the Sierra Club
- David Stern (1820–1875), businessman
- Henry Vidaver (1833–1882), rabbi, publisher, Hebraist, and orator
- Scott Wiener (born 1970), politician

== See also ==
- History of the Jews in the American West
- History of the Jews in the United States
