= Bernard Illowy =

American rabbi and Orthodox Jewish leader

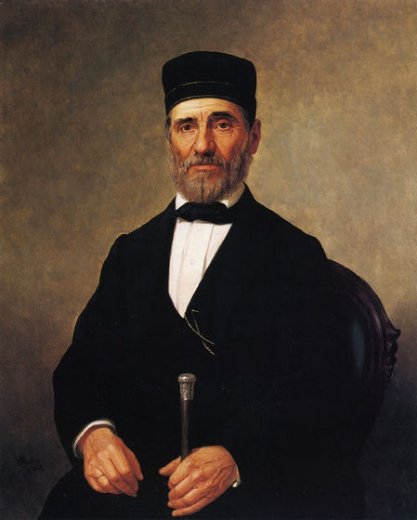

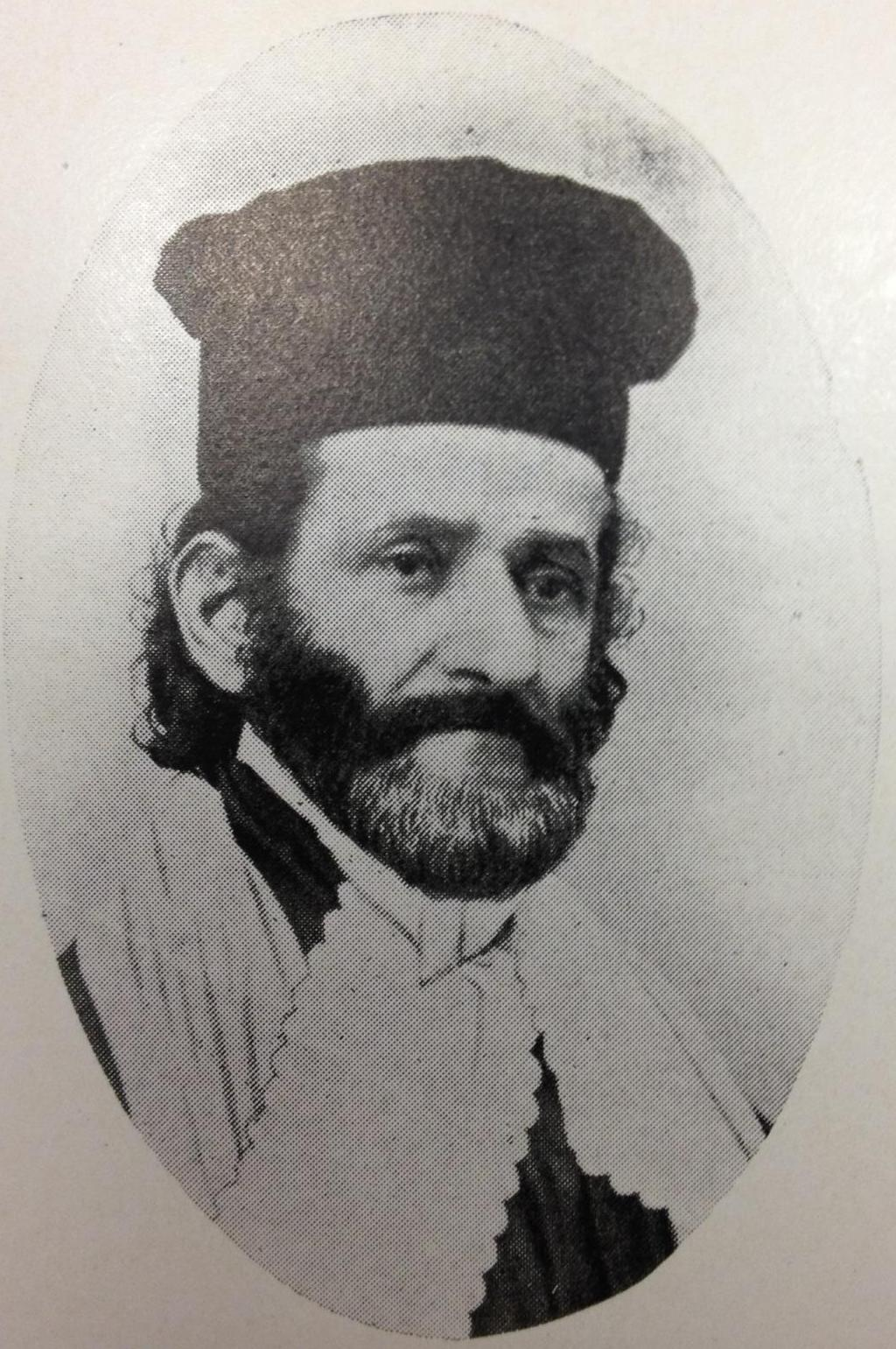

Rabbi Dr. Bernard (Yissochar Dov) Illowy (1814 in Kolín, Bohemia – June 22, 1871 in Cincinnati, Ohio) was a rabbi and leader of Orthodox Judaism in the United States.

== Biography ==
Illowy descended from a family of religious scholars; his great-grandfather, Jacob Illowy, was the rabbi of Kolin. Illowy studied in his native city, later at the school of Rabbi Moses Sofer in Pressburg, where he received rabbinic ordination. Subsequently, Illowy received a PhD from the University of Budapest. Illowy continued his studies at the rabbinical college in Padua, Italy, and then returned to Bohemia, where for a time he was engaged in teaching and tutoring secular subjects in Znaim, Moravia. He served as a professor in a Gymnasium in Znaim as well.

About the year 1845 he married Katherine Schiff, the daughter of Wolf Schiff, a prominent merchant in Raudnitz, Bohemia.

Known for his oratory ability, many of his English sermons and addresses were published. He was reportedly an accomplished linguist, and besides a thorough knowledge of Latin, Greek, and Hebrew, spoke fluent German, English, French, and Italian.

Illowy was unable to secure a position in the rabbinate in Europe due to his opposition to the Habsburg Empire. He was suspected of sympathizing with the local revolutionary elements during the upheavals of 1848. He therefore, emigrated to the United States where he had an easier time being hired as a rabbi. He was rabbi in New York City, Syracuse, Philadelphia, Baltimore, St. Louis and New Orleans, and finally Cincinnati, where he retired. Throughout his tenure in the United States, he was an ardent opponent of the spread of the Reform movement, eloquently and to an extent, successfully challenging the movement's religious innovations and leadership in the press in the United States and Germany.

== St. Louis ==
In 1854, Illowy became the first rabbi of United Hebrew Congregation in St. Louis, then an Orthodox congregation. That same year, he started St. Louis's first Hebrew School which was the first Jewish parochial school in the city. He resigned after one year of service due to "philosophical differences" with the congregation.

== New Orleans ==
While speaking at a National Fast Day program in Baltimore, Maryland, on January 4, 1861, Illowy said, "Who can blame our brethren of the South for seceding from a society whose government can not, or will not, protect the property rights and privileges of a great portion of the Union against the encroachments of a majority misguided by some influential, ambitious aspirants and selfish politicians who, under the color of religion and the disguise of philanthropy, have thrown the country into a general state of confusion, and millions into want and poverty?" Illowy's remarks that day led the German Jewish community of New Orleans, which had been looking for a new rabbi after the death of its last leader, to hire him as their new rabbi.

Illowy's most remarkable achievements were in New Orleans as the rabbi of the Shangarai Chasset synagogue. As noted by Jacob Rader Marcus and other historians, religious observance in New Orleans was weak, with high rates of intermarriage, lack of observance of kosher laws, and a lack of observance of Torah rules – amongst the rabbinate, not to mention their congregants. Upon Illowy's arrival to the New Orleans community, and during his term as rabbi, 1861–1865, the level of Jewish religious observance increased. Various sources detail the increased religious observance, particularly of Shabbat and kosher laws, during the years he served the congregation.

One of Rabbi Illowy's decisions about kashruth was cited in 2008 as still affecting American Jewry today, as noted in the following excerpt: "It’s the muscovy duck that’s highly controversial, due to its ban in America by the ascerbic [sic] Rabbi Bernard Illowy in the mid 1800s. As such, it is still not recognized as kosher in the States today, but in Israel, no such ban ever existed."

Rabbi Illowy is remembered as a "caustic personality, once remarking that despite the presence of more than 200 Jewish communities in America in his time, there were only four ordained rabbis in the whole country (including himself); and of those four, the other three were students of Bilaam ha-Rasha." A similar comment about the sad state of Orthodox Jewry in the United States was made by traveler Israel J. Benjamin in his writings, noting there were over 200 Orthodox congregations in the United States during his journey, but there were only three truly credible rabbis, one in New York, a second in Philadelphia and Illowy in New Orleans.

Illowy's efforts slowly bore the fruits of his labor. His son, Dr. Henry Illoway wrote that shortly after his father took the position in New Orleans, “In one congregation in which he entered upon his duties on the first day of the New Year there were but four or five members who kept a kosher house, and upon the festival of Sukkot there was not a Sukkah in the whole membership. A year later there were over forty Sukkot in the congregation, and almost every house strictly kosher.” Similar claims are noted in The Occident and American Jewish Advocate, giving credit to the synagogue's president S. Friedlander for his support of Illowy.

Isaac Markens, in his 1909 work Abraham Lincoln and the Jews noted that Illowy gave a memorial lecture at Shangarai Chasset for assassinated President Abraham Lincoln.

During Union occupation of New Orleans, he had a friendship with Union Major General Nathaniel P. Banks, Commander-in-Chief of the Department of Louisiana, as well as with many other high officials, both of the military and the civil administration, and was able to do much good for many of his congregants. Despite his charismatic leadership and immense scholarship, after the end of the Civil War, a large influx of Jews from other parts of the Confederacy – where the Reform movement had taken hold – became the majority of the membership of Shangarai Chasset. The new membership voted out the trustees who were supportive of Rabbi Illowy's leadership, and instituted Reform practices in the synagogue. As a result, Illowy resigned his position, and moved to Cincinnati, assuming the pulpit of a newly established Orthodox congregation.

In describing the Shangarai Chasset membership's vote to initiate changes to his synagogue, bitterly, Illowy wrote in the German paper Der Israelit, that: "The enemies of goodness and religion destroyed all... my delicate garden devastated." While Orthodox history books and articles laud Illowy's efforts and conviction to his beliefs heroic and inspirational, some scholars suggest that an unintended consequence of Illowy's constant criticism of the community's lax religious observance created a more fertile environment for Reform to take root within his own synagogue.

== Cincinnati ==
Illowy continued to express his opposition to Reform from his last pulpit in Cincinnati – ironically, the base of the Reform movement – albeit to little avail. His pleas, as eloquent as they may have been, were unable to affect the actions of the everyday lives of the growing Jewish communities throughout the United States. Congregations, requiring rabbinic guidance tended to be open to the liberal innovations of the Reform movement, and heard little opposition in the United States. Thus (whether actively in agreement with the movement's innovations, or passively out of indifference and a desire to maintain a connection to their faith) congregational pulpits were filled by graduates of the Reform movement's rabbinical program. Many congregations founded as Orthodox synagogues scattered through the United States joined the Union of American Hebrew Congregations throughout his life and after his death.

Illowy died in an accident on his farm in Cincinnati. His yahrzeit, 3 Tammuz is noted in certain Orthodox circles, by adherents that say prayers to elevate the memories of righteous individuals.

== Sources ==
- Benjamin, Israel Joseph. Three Years in America, 1859–1862. (Arno Press 1975). ISBN 0-405-06693-7.
- Jackson, Chuck. 'Rabbi Bernard Illowy' in Generations (Jewish Genealogical Society of St. Louis, April 2004)
- Kahn, Catherine C. and Lachoff, Irwin. The Jewish Community of New Orleans. (Arcadia Publishing 2005) ISBN 0-7385-1835-2.
- Sarna, Jonathan D. American Judaism: A History. (Yale University Press 2005) ISBN 0-300-10976-8.
- Singer, Samuel. Biographical sketch noted in Jewish Observer
- Bernard Illowy at the Jewish Encyclopedia. Accessed 2007-08-04.
- Markens, Isaac. Lincoln and the Jews New York, 1909
