= Louis Barnett Abrahams =

Welsh-born English Jewish educator (1839–1918)

- Portrait of Louis Barnett Abrahams by Solomon J. Solomon, 1908
- Born: 3 October 1839; Swansea
- Died: 3 June 1918 (aged 78); Hove
- Occupation: Educator
- Years active: 1869–1907
- Known for: Headmaster of the Jews' Free School in London
- Notable work: A Translation of the Prayer-Book for School Use (1908)

Louis Barnett Abrahams (3 October 1839 – 3 June 1918) was a British educator, the headmaster of the Jews' Free School in London.

Abrahams was prominent, and articles about him appeared regularly in mainstream British Jewish publications in his lifetime, including The Jewish Chronicle, The Jewish Encyclopedia, the Jewish Yearbook (UK - 1899), and the Young Israel (December 1899).

== Education and teaching ==
Abrahams began his studies at the Manchester Hebrew School, but left there to go to London, where he lived with his uncle, Rabbi Aaron Levy, a sofer and dayan (judge) on the London Beth Din. He became a student-teacher at the Jews' Free School on 1 June 1854, and then entered the University of London, completing a bachelor's of arts degree in 1863.

He became a teacher at the Jews' Free School, and became head of the English department in 1864. While continuing to teach there, he also studied at John Curwen's Tonic Sol-Fa College, graduating in 1874 and adding music to the subjects he taught at the Jews' Free School. He became a school administrator in 1884 and headmaster in 1897, succeeding Moses Angel.

As Moses Angel did before him, Abrahams disliked the Yiddish spoken by Jews newly arrived to England in a wave of immigration from Russia. In a 1905 speech at a prize-giving ceremony, he called Yiddish "that miserable jargon which was not a language at all". Instead, he favored immersion in English as a way of quickly assimilating Yiddish-speaking students. Along with the introduction of music to the curriculum, he founded a cadet corps at the school, built a gymnasium, and organized sporting activities for the students. He also moved the school away from purely theoretical studies and towards technical and vocational training, by opening new physics and chemistry laboratories and woodworking and metalworking shops. Under his leadership the school became "the largest public elementary school in the world". He retired from the school in 1907.

== Other activities ==
Abrahams founded a periodical, the Jewish Record, in 1868, and served as its first editor for three years. He also helped found the Jewish Educational Board and the Teachers' Training Committee, and worked with several local benevolent societies. After retiring, he became honorary president of the synagogue at Westcliff-on-Sea.

A portrait of Abrahams by Solomon Joseph Solomon was part of an exhibition at the Burlington House in the Royal Academy of Arts in 1908.

== Personal ==
Abrahams was born on 3 October 1839 in Swansea. His father, Barnett Abrahams (1785–1868), taught Hebrew there, and became cantor in Manchester in 1845. His mother, Hannah, was Barnett's second wife, came from a Polish family, and died in 1868. Abrahams married Fannie Rosetta Mosely on 11 February 1869; they had two children. His son, Bertram Louis Abrahams (1870–1908) was a physician, a member of the Royal College of Surgeons, and a Fellow of the Royal College of Physicians. He died on 3 June 1918.

== Publications ==
Abrahams was the author of:

- Murby's Chronological History of England (1870)
- A manual of Scriptural History for Jewish Schools and Families (1882)
- A Translation of the Prayer-Book for School Use (1908)

His translation of the prayer-book was widely used in Jewish schools throughout England.

A sonnet by Abrahams was included in The Standard Book of Jewish Verse.
