= Congregation Sherith Israel (San Francisco) =

Reform Jewish synagogue in San Francisco, California, United States

Temple Sherith Israel
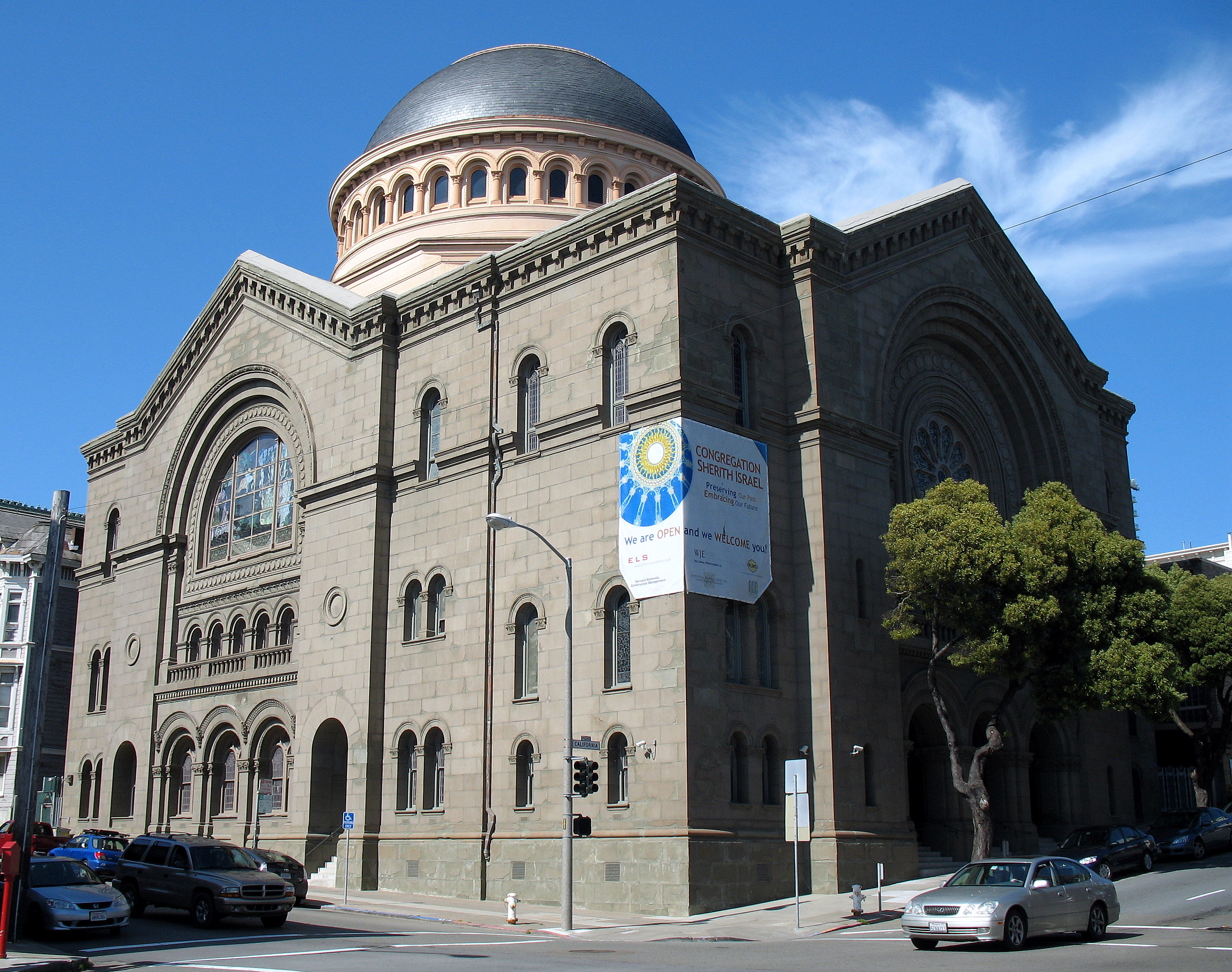
- The synagogue main sanctuary, gallery and dome (SE aspect), in 2011

- Location in San Francisco Bay Area, California

Religion
- Affiliation: Reform Judaism
- Ecclesiastical or organisational status: Synagogue
- Governing body: Union for Reform Judaism
- Leadership: Rabbi Jessica Zimmerman Graf; Rabbi Larry Raphael (Emeritus)
- Status: Active

Location
- Location: 2266 California Street, San Francisco, California 94115
- Country: United States
- Coordinates: 37°47′22″N 122°25′55″W

Architecture
- Architect: Albert Pissis
- Type: Synagogue architecture
- Style: Beaux-Arts; Byzantine Revival; Romanesque Revival
- Established: 1851 (as a congregation)
- Groundbreaking: October 8, 1903
- Completed: 1905
- Construction cost: $250,000

Specifications
- Direction of façade: South
- Capacity: 1,385 worshipers
- Length: 128 feet (39 m)
- Width: 100 feet (30 m)
- Interior area: 20,000 square feet (1,900 m^{2})
- Height (max): 140 feet (43 m)
- Dome: One
- Dome height (outer): 50 feet (15 m)
- Dome dia. (outer): 60 feet (18 m)
- Materials: Brick, Colusa sandstone, steel, wood, lath, plaster, stained glass, slate

Website
- sherithisrael.org
- Congregation Sherith Israel
- U.S. National Register of Historic Places
- NRHP reference No.: 10000114
- Added to NRHP: March 31, 2010

Congregation Sherith Israel (transliterated from Hebrew; "loyal remnant of Israel") is a Reform Jewish congregation and synagogue, located in San Francisco, California, in the United States. Founded in 1851 during California’s Gold Rush period, it is one of the oldest synagogues in the United States. In more modern times, the congregation widely known for its innovative approach to worship and lifecycle celebrations. Listed on the National Register of Historic Places, its historic sanctuary building, completed in 1905, is one of San Francisco's most prominent architectural landmarks.

The synagogue was a principal site of the San Francisco graft prosecution trials held between 1905 and 1908.

== History and congregational life ==
=== The Gold Rush and Jewish pioneers ===
In 1848, the village of Yerba Buena lay poised between Mexican rule and American annexation when gold was found 140 miles away at Sutter's Mill. Meanwhile, Jews in Central Europe lived under repressive regimes that constrained employment, forced military conscription and restricted marriage. Many enterprising young Jews did not see a future for themselves in their homelands. Drawn by the lure of wealth, freedom and opportunity, California became their new Promised Land.

=== The founding of Congregation Sherith Israel ===
In September 1849 – months after the discovery of gold but still a year before California achieved statehood – a small band of Jewish pioneers gathered in a wood-frame tent. Although lacking a rabbi and Torah scrolls, they were determined to celebrate Rosh Hashanah and Yom Kippur.

These young Jews came from Prussia, Bavaria, England, France and the eastern United States. They worshiped together again during Passover and the High Holy Days in 1850, formed two benevolent societies to aid the needy and bought land for a cemetery.

In April 1851, San Francisco’s frontier Jews met again, this time to establish a permanent congregation and elect officers. In typical fashion they split almost immediately, forming not one but two synagogues: Congregation Sherith Israel followed the minhag Polen, the traditions of Jews from Posen in Prussia, while Congregation Emanu-El chose to worship according to the German practices of Jews from Bavaria. The synagogues have been friendly neighbors ever since.

=== The birth of a Reform Jewish institution ===
As San Francisco boomed, keeping Sherith Israel housed proved a considerable challenge. The congregation’s first temporary meeting place, like much of the city, was destroyed by the "Great Fire" of 1851. After losing its next home to yet another of the conflagrations that routinely swept through the city during those early years, Sherith Israel's members built the temple's first house of worship on Stockton Street between Broadway and Vallejo in 1854 at a cost of $10,000.

So many Jews had departed Europe for San Francisco that, by the end of the 1850s, upwards of six percent of the city’s population was Jewish – a higher percentage (briefly) than in New York. After the Civil War, another generation arrived to seek its fortune in California. In 1870, Congregation Sherith Israel moved to a Gothic-style structure on Post and Taylor Streets, where it remained for 34 years.

Initially Orthodox in the Polish style, Sherith Israel took major steps toward becoming a Reform congregation during this period. In a visible departure from tradition, the Post Street sanctuary was designed for mixed seating. Gradually, with much discussion and struggle, wearing a kippah became optional, Friday evening services were initiated, a choir introduced and a new prayerbook chosen. Two dynamic rabbis hastened the move toward Reform: Rabbi Henry Vidaver (1873–1882) and Rabbi Jacob Nieto (1893–1930). In 1903, as ground was broken for the current site on California Street, Congregation Sherith Israel made these changes official and joined the Union of American Hebrew Congregations, now known as the Union for Reform Judaism.

== Sanctuary building ==
In the 1890s, Congregation Sherith Israel faced the prospect of outgrowing its 1870 Gothic Revival-style synagogue on Post Street. Heeding this realization, congregational leaders first secured property on the northeast corner of California and Webster Streets on September 8, 1902, then hired École des Beaux Arts-trained architect Albert Pissis to draw up plans for a new temple. Ground was broken on October 8, 1903, and the cornerstone was laid on February 22, 1904. The sanctuary was officially consecrated on September 24, 1905. While improvements have been made through the ensuing years, the building has been preserved close to its original construction.

Temple Sherith Israel, a fusion of Byzantine and Romanesque forms, cost $250,000 to build in 1904–1905. The structure stands 140 feet (43 m) above California Street. Its signature dome – which can be seen from many vantage points throughout San Francisco – is 60 feet (18 m) wide at its outside diameter. The sanctuary's interior contains 20,000 square feet (1,900 m^{2}) of space, 3,500 organ pipes, nearly 1,400 seats, 1,109 decorative light bulbs, more than 89 ornamental leaded glass windows and 32 arched clear glass windows in its outer drum.

During the 1906 earthquake, the building sustained only modest damage which was quickly repaired. It housed the San Francisco County Superior Court during the San Francisco graft trials. It was also undamaged during the 1989 Loma Prieta earthquake. Nonetheless, the State of California has mandated that unreinforced masonry structures like Temple Sherith Israel must meet stringent seismic resilience standards. In 2017, the congregation completed a seismic retrofit of the sanctuary, funded through a capital campaign.

== Rabbinical leadership ==
The following individuals have served as rabbi of Congregation Sherith Israel:

| Ordinal | Officeholder | Term start | Term end | Time in office | Notes |
|---|---|---|---|---|---|
| 1 | Julius Eckman | 1854 | 1856 | 1–2 years | |
| 1 | Henry A. Henry | 1857 | 1869 | 11–12 years | |
| 2 | Aaron J. Messing | 1870 | 1890 | 20 years | |
| 3 | Jacob Nieto | 1893 | 1930 | 36–37 years | |
| 4 | Jacob J. Weinstein | 1930 | 1932 | 1–2 years | |
| 5 | Morris Goldstein | 1932 | 1972 | 39–40 years | |
| 6 | Martin Weiner | 1972 | 2003 | 30–31 years | |
| 7 | Larry Raphael | 2003 | 2016 | 12–13 years | |
| 8 | Jessica Zimmerman Graf | 2016 | incumbent | 9–10 years | |

== Gallery ==
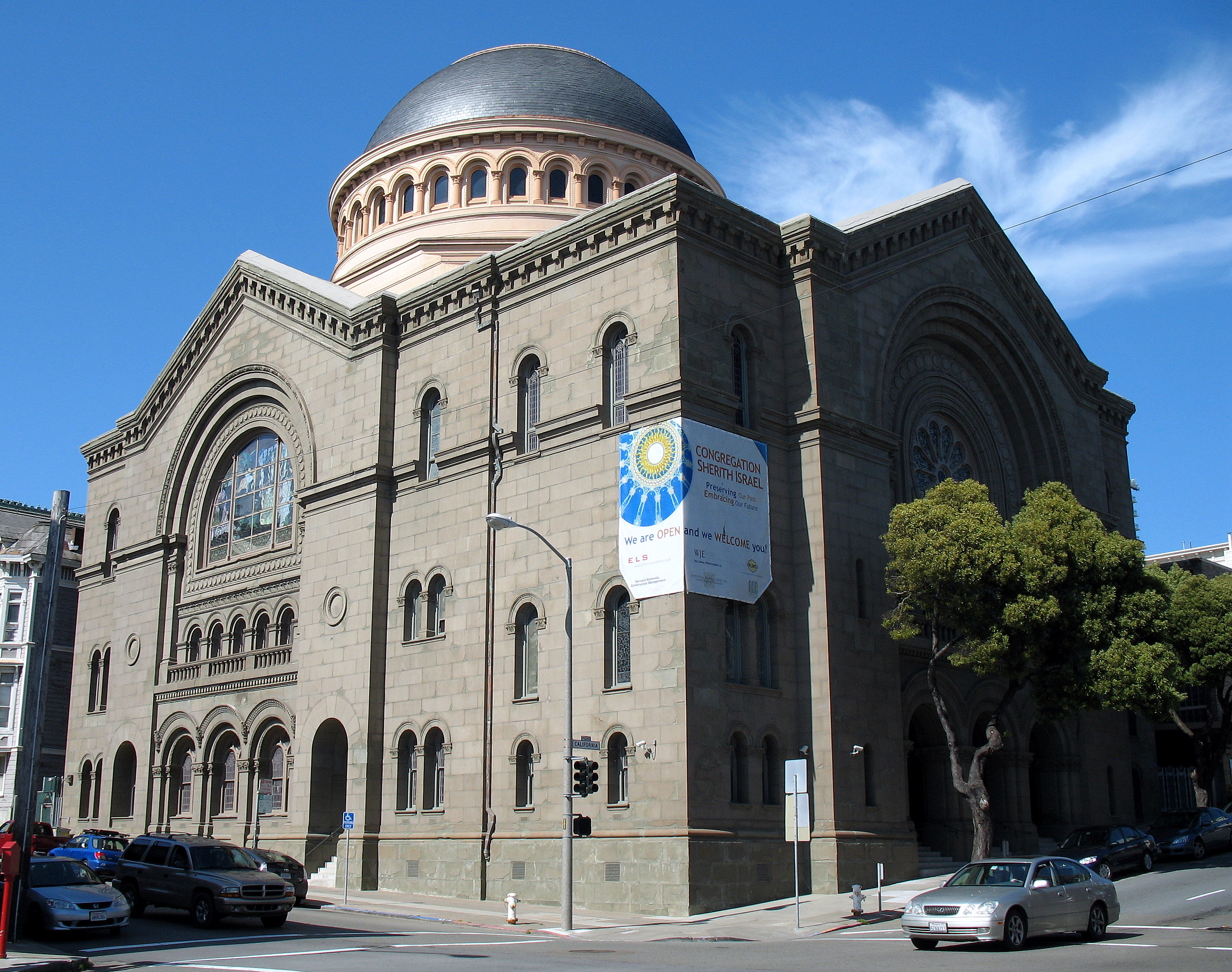
Southwest corner

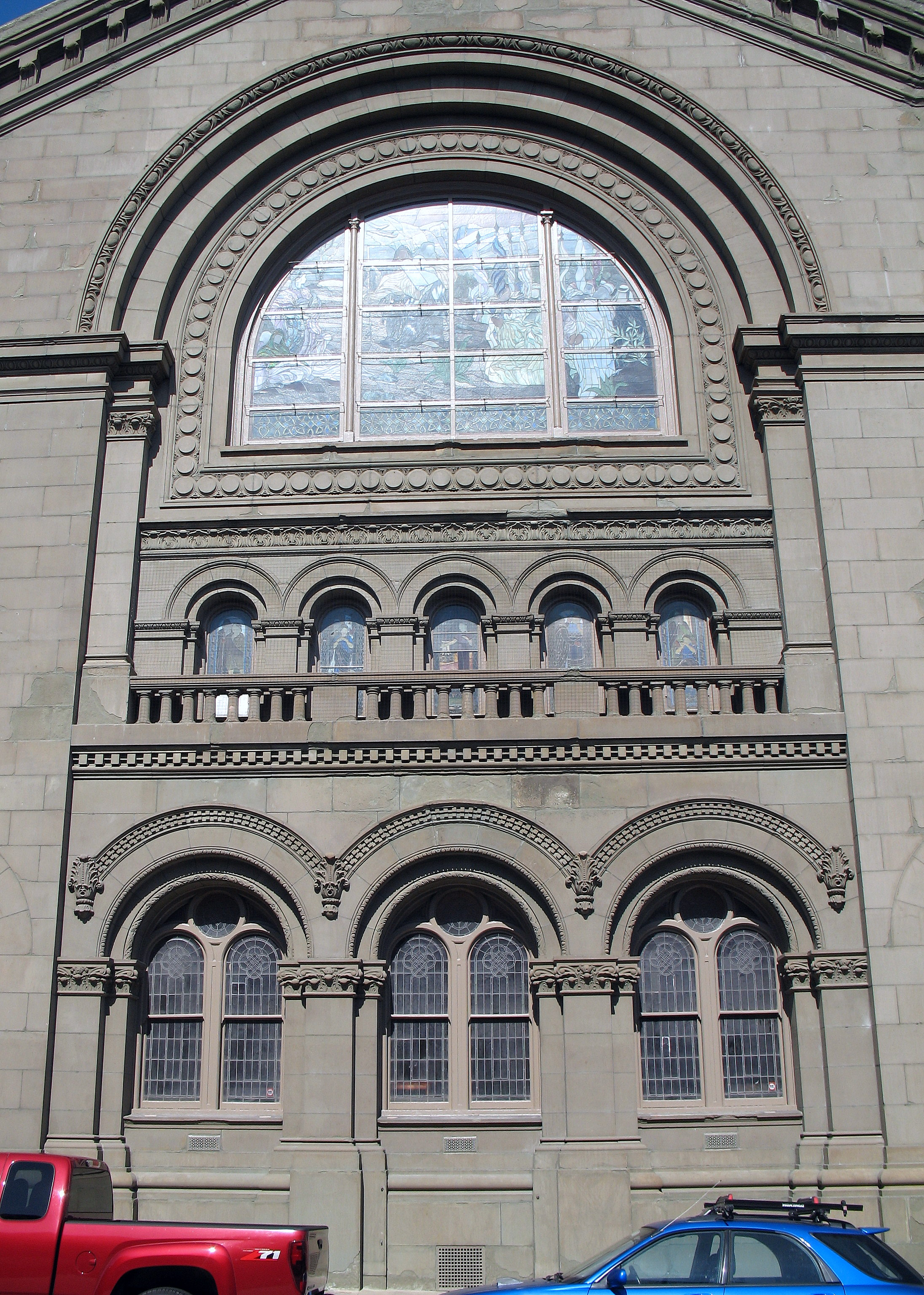
West façade

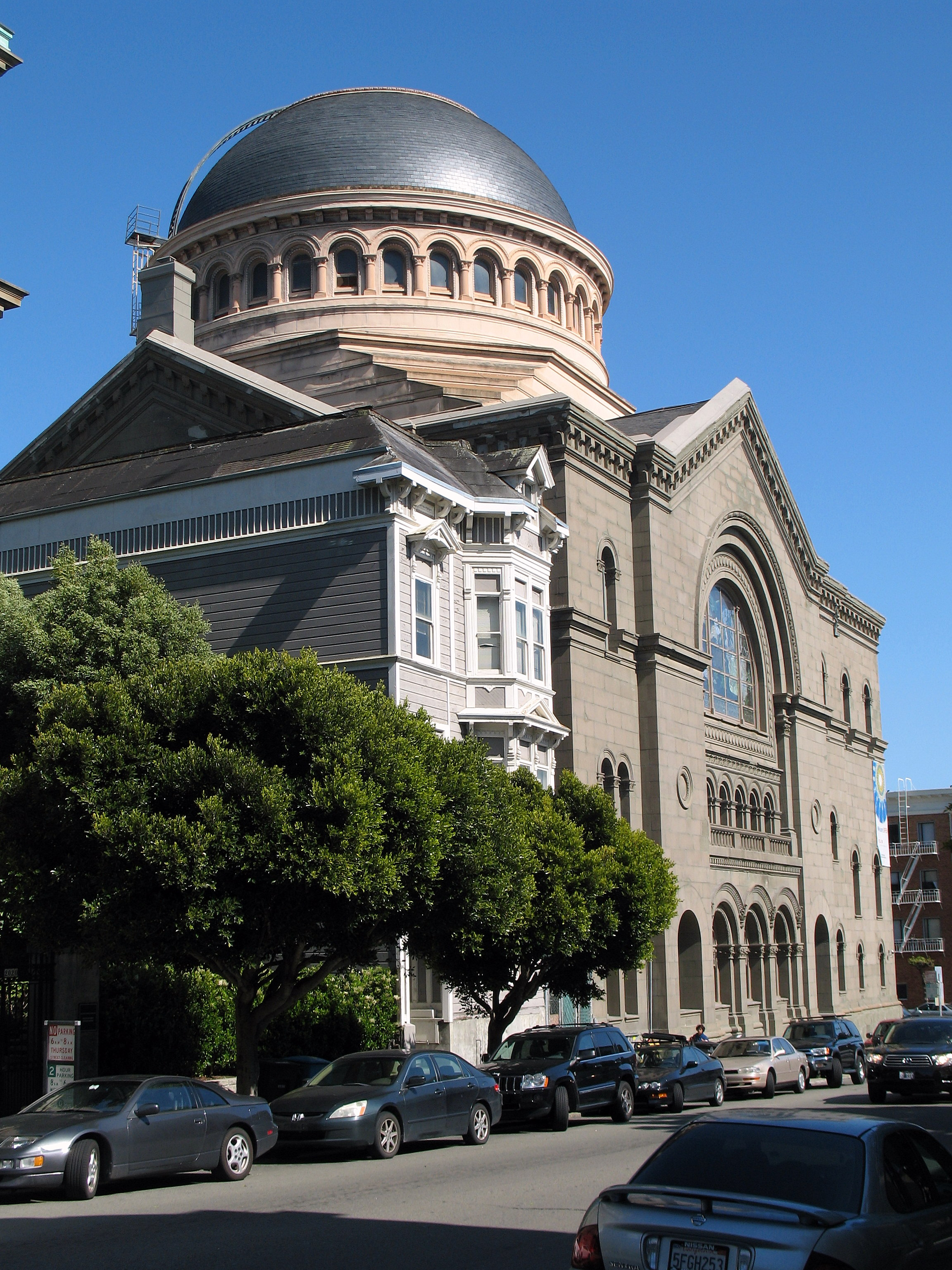
Northwest corner

== See also ==
- Hills of Eternity Memorial Park
- History of the Jews in San Francisco
- National Register of Historic Places listings in San Francisco
