= Henry J. Messing =

Henry Joseph Messing (March 10, 1847 – September 12, 1913) was a German-American rabbi who ministered in St. Louis, Missouri, United States, for over 30 years.

== Life ==
Messing was born on March 10, 1847 in Gostyń, Prussia, the son of Joseph and Fannie Messing. His father was a Talmudist, exegete, and rabbi. His brothers Aaron J. Messing and Mayer Messing were also rabbis.

After attending the local gymnasium, Messing attended the University of Breslau and the Jewish Theological Seminary of Breslau. He studied under Rabbi Elias Gutmacher and was ordained a rabbi by Rabbi Gedaliah Titkin of Breslau. He then immigrated to America and was named rabbi of Dubuque, Iowa in 1869. He then served as rabbi in Williamsport, Pennsylvania from 1870 to 1877, followed by Peoria, Illinois from 1877 to 1878. In 1878, he became rabbi of United Hebrew Congregation in St. Louis, Missouri. While in St. Louis, he founded the Hebrew Free and Industrial School Society in 1880.

Messing served as rabbi of the United Hebrew Congregation until 1907, when he was named rabbi emeritus. The congregation grew under him to the point where they moved twice to bigger buildings. He was Master of a Freemason lodge, a member of B'nai B'rith, president of the Free Sons of Israel, and vice-president of the United Jewish Charities and the Jewish Educational Alliance.

In 1872, Messing married Jennie May in Williamsport. Their children were Elsie Jane Berman (who was dead by 1912), Mrs. Lillian Dillmont, Alfred H., Oscar, Mrs. Hattie Fireside, Mrs. Josephine Roman, Mrs. Florence May, and Roswell. Alfred was a newspaper editor and advertising executive who at one point was publisher of the Chicago Examiner.

Messing died on September 12, 1913, a few days after he suffered a serious fall downstairs. His funeral at the United Hebrew Congregation was under the direction of the Freemasons and headed by Missouri Grand Master Jacob Lampert. Rabbi Leon Harrison, Rabbi Samuel Sale, and his nephew Rabbi A.J. Messing spoke at the funeral. Over 150 members of the Freemasons attended the funeral, and members of B'nai B'rith and the Free Sons of Israel attended as a body. The funeral procession was reportedly the largest to occur in St. Louis until then and traffic had to be suspended to accommodate it. Rabbi Morris Spitz spoke at his grave when he was buried at Mt. Olive Cemetery.
