= Moses Angel =

Anglo-Jewish educator

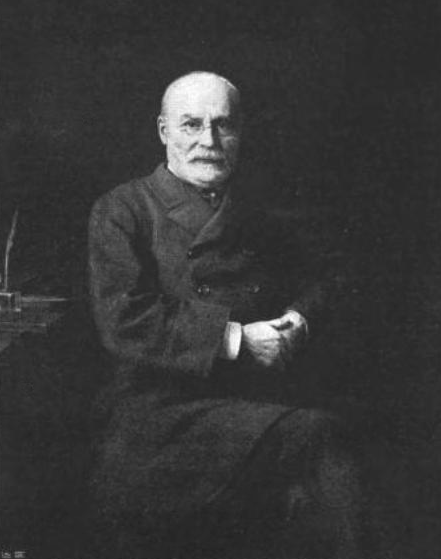
In The Sketch, 22 April 1896

Moses Angel (born Angel Moses; 29 April 1819 – 2 September 1898) was headmaster at the Jews' Free School (JFS) in Bell Lane, Spitalfields from 1842 until 1897. He has been described as "the single most significant figure in Anglo-Jewish religious and secular education in the 19th century".

Angel published several books, including one on the Torah in 1858. He founded and edited the Jewish Chronicle in the early 1840s, along with rabbi David Meldola.

== Early life and education ==
Angel Moses (later Moses Angel) was born in Hammersmith. Son of Emanuel Moses and Sarah Angel, he was one of 11 children. He studied at H. N. Solomon’s Boarding School in Hammersmith, and entered University College School in Bloomsbury at the age of 14. After further study at University College London, he became a bank clerk, and then took up teaching. His father got convicted of robbing a coach — which probably led Angel to reverse his birth name. Even so, he became the respected headmaster of the JFS in the East End.

== Career at the Jews’ Free School (JFS) ==
In 1840, with the retirement of headmaster H. A. Henry, Angel was appointed master of the Talmud, the upper division of JFS. Soon after, he became headmaster of the entire school. On 11 January 1843, Angel married Rebekah Godfrey. They had three sons and three daughters.

In the same year he instituted two Teacher-Training departments in the School. He was advisor to the National Education Department. He was a strict disciplinarian who kept a close watch on most activities at the school. Shouldering an enormous administrative burden, he still found time to teach reading, writing, grammar, geography, history, arithmetic, algebra, and chemistry.

Angel was meticulous in recording of daily events in school journals – those dating from 1863 till his death in 1898 are still in existence.

Angel's long association with the JFS saw the school grow through important changes. The introduction in 1870 of a national system of Board Schools funded by local taxes – the predecessors of the current county schools – seemed at first to threaten the existence of voluntary schools like JFS, which relied largely on donations. Despite fears the voluntary schools survived, and JFS grew in strength.

The school grew to an astonishing 2,400 pupils by 1870. In fact the school met more needs than ever before, in the 1880s and 1890s, the mass exodus of Jews from Eastern Europe placed enormous demands on housing and social welfare in the East End. Not all immigrant children could be accommodated at JFS. Matthew Arnold, the Schools' Inspector, was greatly impressed by it. Angel did much to integrate immigrant Jewish children into the mainstream of English society.

It is believed JFS took in approximately a third of the children of the East End in the closing stages of the 1800s and, by 1900, it had over 4,000 pupils on its register.

Moses Angel impressed his vision on the school during this period. By the early 1890s, more than a third of his pupils had been born abroad and, of those born in England, most were the children of recently arrived immigrants, while many were still struggling with English and all the problems that a new way of life would bring.

Although he was intent on keeping the Jewish faith alive among his pupils, Angel was unswerving in his conviction that they should adopt English culture and tradition. He strongly discouraged the use of Yiddish. The attempt to eradicate Yiddish was clearly successful. Within two generations, there were few even in the East End who spoke it comfortably. Yiddish theatre continued to serve as a sentimental reminder of a lost culture, but gradually became a minority taste.

In December 1897, failing health compelled Angel to step aside as JFS headmaster in favor of Louis Barnett Abrahams; Angel took on the less burdensome post of principal. He died at his home in London on 2 September 1898.

== Bibliography ==
- Black, Gerry (1998). JFS: The History of the Jews’ Free School, London since 1732. London: Tymsder Publishing. ISBN 0953110400.
- Rubinstein, W.; Jolles, Michael, eds. (2011). The Palgrave Dictionary of Anglo-Jewish History. Basingstoke: Palgrave Macmillan. ISBN 9780230304666.
- The Law of Sinai and Its Appointed Times (1858), being a commentary on the Pentateuch
- The Pentateuch a series of articles written for the Jewish Record
