= Manis Jacobs =

Manis (Morris) Jacobs (1782 in Amsterdam, Netherlands – September 28, 1839 in New Orleans, Louisiana) was the founder, first president and although unordained, the first rabbi of Congregation Shangarai Chasset of New Orleans.

Though Jacobs was never ordained, he assumed the duties of rabbi of the congregation until his death in 1839. Though Jacobs took a French Catholic wife, Angelique Charlotte Jacinthe Verneuille (1781/82-1851), he nonetheless played an active role in the congregation, contributing significant resources to establish organized Jewish life in New Orleans.

In March 1828, Jacobs purchased land in his own name to be used for burial purposes by the congregation, calling the benevolent society by the same name as the synagogue. Aside from Jacobs, the wardens of the society included other early Jewish community leaders Asher Phillips, Abraham Green and Abraham Plotz. This property was located on Jackson Street (now Jackson Avenue) at Saratoga Street, within what is now the Central City neighborhood of New Orleans (but was outside the city limits before 1830). In April of that year Jacobs turned the property over to the congregation, after its charter was approved.

There are surviving records in the Orleans County Probate Court archives referring to Jacobs' estate.

== Sources ==
- Hill, Samuel S. On Jordan's Stormy Banks: Religion in the South: a Southern Exposure (Mercer University Press 1983). ISBN 0-86554-035-7
- Rader Marcus, Jacob. United States Jewry, 1776-1985 (Wayne State University Press 1989). ISBN 0-8143-2186-0
- Wiernik, Peter. History of the Jews in America: From the Period of the Discovery of the New World to the Present (The Jewish Press Publishing Company 1912).
