= Dora Messing Meyberg =

Dora Messing Meyberg (November 19, 1869 – July 16, 1955) was very active in civic and club affairs, the first President of the Los Angeles Hadassah Women's Zionist Organization of America.

== Early life ==
Dora Messing was born on November 19, 1869, in Indianapolis, Indiana, the daughter of Rabbi Mayer Messing (1843–1930) and Rika Messing.

== Career ==
She was very active in civic and club affairs. She was the first President of the Los Angeles Hadassah Women's Zionist Organization of America; she was vice-president of B'nai B'rith Sisterhood.

She was a member of the National Council of Jewish Women. She was also the president of the Music and Art Foundation.

== Personal life ==
She moved to California and lived at 721 Irolo St., Los Angeles, California.

Dora Messing married Mitchel Scott Meyberg (1864–1944), attorney, and had three children: E. James (1890–1976), Leonard J. (1895–1976), Dorothy (1901–1983).

She died on July 16, 1955, and is buried at Forest Lawn Memorial Park (Glendale).
