= James Koppel Gutheim =

German-American rabbi and educational leader (1817–1886)

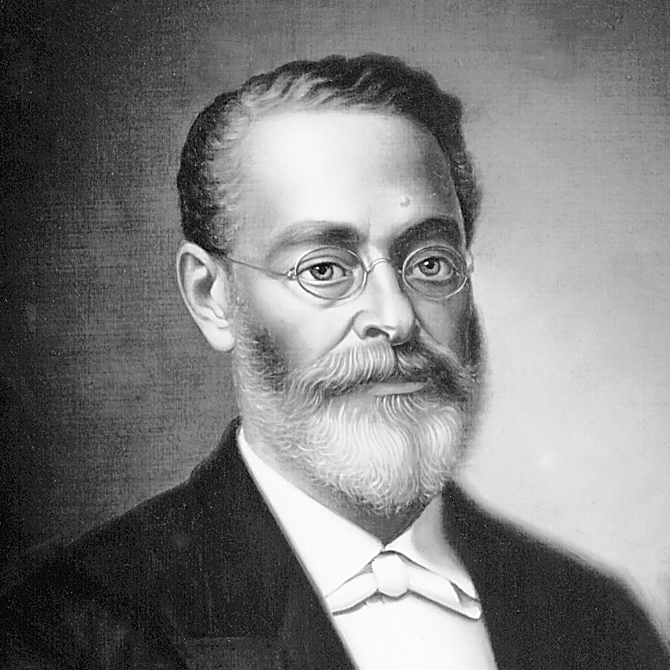
- Gutheim, in an undated portrait
- Born: November 15, 1817; Münster, Westphalia, Prussia
- Died: May 11, 1886 (aged 68)
- Occupations: Rabbi; hazzan; educational leader
- Years active: 1843–1886
- Employers: Shangarai Chasset; New Orleans Board of Education

James Koppel Gutheim (November 15, 1817 – May 11, 1886) was a German-born American rabbi of congregation Shangarai Chasset of New Orleans and an educational leader.

== Biography ==
Gutheim was born near Münster in Westphalia, Prussia. In 1843, Gutheim arrived in the United States and immediately thrust himself upon the Jewish scene. Gutheim was a strong proponent of education, both religious and, in his latter days, secular as well.

During the 1840s, while serving the Jewish community in Cincinnati, Ohio, he attempted to start a Jewish school, but it did not last long. Later in his career, he was the president of the New Orleans Board of Education.

Generally referred to favorably in literature of the time, in The Occident and American Jewish Advocate, Isaac Leeser offered Gutheim especially favorable coverage through the 1860s. Gutheim's move from Cincinnati, Ohio, to New Orleans was given flowery coverage, describing that "The Crescent City has robbed the Queen of the West of one of the brightest jewels in her diadem." There was also the printing of an exchange of pleasantries in the form of correspondence between Gutheim, then serving as congregational rabbi of Shangarai Chasset and the congregation's president, Isaac Hart (father of Confederate States Army Major Alexander Hart), when the congregation presented Gutheim with a gift marking the anniversary of his service to the congregation. His first term as rabbi of the synagogue was from 1850 to 1853.

After his first term at Shangarai Chasset ended, Gutheim served as the New Orleans Portuguese Synagogue Nefutzot Yehudah's rabbi and hazzan, where he encountered both religious and political controversy.

During 1860, he appears to have encountered some controversy with regard to his position as the Acting President of Touro Monument Association. Gutheim advocated for the construction of a statue memorializing Judah Touro, whose philanthropic giving was incomparable. Touro was a wealthy New Orleans businessma who left an estate of $200,000 providing funds for every existing traditional synagogue in America and $50,000 for the relief of poor Jews in the Holy Land. During his lifetime, Touro did Jewish charitable giving and funded civic projects throughout the United States, including establishing parks as well as funding the construction of a New Orleans church. The community halted Gutheim's efforts when a traveler, Israel Joseph Benjamin, present at a communal meeting regarding the statue, challenged the decision to erect the memorial statue, as it violated traditional Jewish Law.

Disappointed by the failure of his project, Gutheim withdrew his congregation's pledged $900 support of Benjamin's international Jewish welfare organization and attempted to smear Benjamin in the press. His actions in the media were considered deplorable by leaders of Reform Judaism in Cincinnati, and those leaders also ruled that erecting the statue appeared to violate Jewish tradition according to their interpretations of Jewish standards.

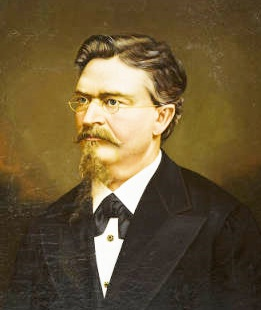
Gutheim

Further difficulties arose for Gutheim in 1863, when he refused to take the oath of allegiance to the Union after New Orleans was recaptured. He fled New Orleans and served as rabbi to Jewish congregations in Montgomery, Alabama and Columbus, Georgia.

Gutheim returned to New Orleans after the Civil War to serve as Shangarai Chasset's rabbi but left to serve in New York City's Temple Emanuel in 1868. In 1872, he once again returned to New Orleans to become minister of the New Orleans Temple Sinai, where he preached until his death. He died in New Orleans.

According to Temple Beth-El of San Antonio, Texas, on September 10, 1875, Gutheim was engaged as a guest rabbi there to lead the inaugural services at the congregation's new structure.

Devoting himself to Jewish studies late in life, he was referred to as "one of the most eloquent and learned men in American Jewry", particularly in connection with his service as the New Orleans Reform Temple Sinai's spiritual leader, and his adherence to the principles of tikkun olam.

Gutheim's lifetime involvement in educational and charitable work was recognized by the Louisiana State Senate, who adjourned on the day of his funeral. The Menorah, in its July–December 1894 edition, noted that the B'nai B'rith lodge (No. 439) in New Orleans was named after Gutheim during that year. Lodge members credited Gutheim as a "beloved teacher and pulpit orator ... deeply enshrined upon the hearts of the people of New Orleans."
