= Josh Kennet =

English footballer

Josh Kennet ג'וש קנט
Personal information
- Full name: Joshua Simon Kennet
- Date of birth: 27 September 1987 (age 39)
- Place of birth: Camden, England
- Positions: Midfielder; right back

Team information
- Current team: London Lions

Youth career
- Millwall
- –2004: Tottenham Hotspur
- 2004–2006: Oxford United

Senior career*
Years	Team	Apps	(Gls)
2006–2007	Oxford United	1	(0)
2007	→ Didcot Town (loan)		
2007–2010	Maccabi Herzliya	37	(1)
- * Club domestic league appearances and goals as of 04:46, 30 December 2015 (UTC)

Joshua Simon Kennet (Hebrew: יהושע סימון קנט; born 27 September 1987) is an English footballer currently with London Lions.

== Early and personal life ==
Kennet is Jewish, and was born to a Jewish family in Camden, England. His father Eilon was born in Israel, and manages London Maccabi Lions A. Josh grew up in North London, and attended Jewish Free School (JFS) in Kingsbury. He showed early signs of ability in most sports particularly in football. He represented London schools in football and athletics. Kennet's brother, Ricky, plays for London Lions and represented the United Kingdom at the 2007 European Maccabiah Games in Rome, Italy.

Kennet has also become an Israeli citizen.

== Playing career ==
After spells at Millwall and Tottenham Hotspur from the age of 14 to 16, Kennet signed a 2-year YTS contract with Oxford United. From the age of 16 Kennet was a regular in the reserve side for the following two years. Throughout this period Kennet captained the youth side. He was then given his first professional contract at the age of 18 by manager Darren Patterson. On 1 January 2007 Kennet made his league debut for Oxford against Exeter City. After the arrival of Jim Smith, opportunities in the first team were few and far between and Kennet spent most of his time on the bench and playing for the reserves. Kennet then joined neighbouring team Didcot Town on loan.

In 2007, Kennet signed a 3-year contract for Israeli premier league club Maccabi Herzliya after impressing during a two-week trial.

On 3 October 2008 Kennet was named to a preliminary list of 23 players to represent the United Kingdom at the 2009 Maccabiah Games. He played for the United Kingdom in Israel at the 2013 Maccabiah Games, and at the 2017 Maccabiah Games, winning a silver medal.

== Career statistics ==
As of match played 29 December 2015

Appearances and goals by club, season and competition
Club	Season	League			National Cup		League Cup		Continental		Other		Total	
Club	Season	Division	Apps	Goals	Apps	Goals	Apps	Goals	Apps	Goals	Apps	Goals	Apps	Goals
Oxford United	2006–07	Conference	1	0	0	0	0	0	0	0	0	0	1	0
Maccabi Herzliya	2007–08	Premier League	12	0	1	0	3	0	0	0	0	0	16	0
Maccabi Herzliya	2008–09	Liga Leumit	17	1	0	0	8	0	0	0	0	0	25	1
Maccabi Herzliya	2009–10	Liga Leumit	8	0	0	0	2	0	0	0	0	0	10	0
Wingate & Finchley	2014–15	Isthmian League												
London Lions	2015–16	Herts County League												
Total			-	-	-	-	-	-	-	-	-	-	-	-
Career total			-	-	-	-	-	-	-	-	-	-	-	-

== See also ==
- List of select Jewish football (association; soccer) players
