= JFS (school) =

Jewish school in London, England

Location
- The Mall; Kenton, Harrow, Greater London, HA3 9TE; England; 51.58118°N 0.28135°W

Information
- Type: Voluntary aided comprehensive
- Religious affiliation: Modern Orthodox Judaism
- Established: 1732; 294 years ago
- Local authority: Brent
- Department for Education URN: 133724 Tables
- Ofsted: Reports
- President: Lord Michael Levy
- Chair: Mark Hurst
- Head teacher: David Moody
- Years taught: Years 7-13
- Gender: Coeducational
- Age: 11 to 18
- Enrolment: ~ 2100 pupils
- Average class size: ~ 300 pupils
- Houses: Angel Brodetsky Weizmann Zangwill
- Colours: Blue, Yellow/Gold
- Newspaper: JFS Journal
- Website: jfs.brent.sch.uk

JFS (formerly known as the Jews' Free School and later Jewish Free School) is a Jewish mixed comprehensive school in Kenton, North London, England, founded in 1732. Amongst its early supporters was the writer and philanthropist Charlotte Montefiore. At one time it was the largest Jewish school in the world, with more than 4,000 pupils.

== History ==
The school was founded in 1732, sited at Dukes Place in the City of London. It later moved to the East End, then to Camden Town. In 2002 it moved to a new site in Kenton to meet the demand of London's Jewish population moving further out towards the suburbs. The school is within the jurisdiction of the London Borough of Brent, and its postal town is Harrow.

== Staff ==
=== Headteachers ===
2021–	Dr David Moody
2021	Paul Ramsay (Acting Joint Headteacher); Anna Joseph (Acting Joint Headteacher)
2021	Martin Tissot (Interim Headteacher)
2021	Sir Michael Wilshaw (Executive Headteacher)
2018–2021	Rachel Fink
2018	Simon Appleman (Acting Headteacher)
2016–2017	Debby Lipkin (Executive Headteacher); Simon Appleman (Acting Headteacher)
2008–2016	Jonathan Miller
1993–2007	Dame Ruth Robins
1985–1993	Josephine Wagerman
1973–1984	Leslie Gatoff
1958–1972	Dr Edward S Conway
1897–1907	Louis Barnett Abrahams
1842–1897	Moses Angel
1832–1842	Henry A. Henry

=== Other staff ===
- Michael Adler taught Hebrew at the school in the late-19th century.

== Houses and other traditions ==
JFS operates the house system and has four houses for organisational purposes. Students must wear a tie with stripes in their house colour.

House	Named after	Colour
Angel	Moses Angel	Red
Brodetsky	Selig Brodetsky	Blue
Weizmann	Chaim Weizmann	Green
Zangwill	Israel Zangwill	Yellow

Both Brodetsky and Zangwill were former students, Angel was a previous and long-serving headmaster and Weizmann, who has several links to the school, was the first President of the State of Israel.

Students are split into their respective houses for most classes in Years 7, 8 and 9 as well as inter-house competitions, such as football and basketball.

A tradition called "muck-up day" involves Year 11 students celebrating the last day of formal schooling before their GCSE examinations with various pranks. In May 2015 this descended into "a near-riot", with more than 300 pupils barred from the campus after a small minority spread foam, eggs, flour and dead chickens around the school. The police were called after some students broke through a security fence and let off fireworks, but no arrests were made.

== Academic results ==
In 2007, 53% of the school's attempted GCSE exams received grades of A* or A. In 2012 JFS was at the top of the School League Tables for GCSE in Brent and its A-Level results were the best of all the mainstream Jewish schools.

In 2024 at GCSE level, 95% of students passed both English and Mathematics, and 48% of all grades were a ‘Grade 7’ or above. 30% of all grades were a ‘Grade 8’ or above.

== Awards ==
The school won a Wellbeing at School Award in 2021.

== Controversy over admissions criteria ==
In October 2006, a Jewish father made enquiries with the United Synagogue as to whether his son, born to a mother who had been converted to Judaism under the auspices of the Masorti (Conservative) denomination, could convert under Orthodox auspices for entry to JFS in September 2007. He was advised the process could take several years and that such applications to JFS are very rarely successful given that the school is highly oversubscribed. He applied for his son but did not declare to the school's admissions board the mother's conversion history.

By April 2007, he had not supplied JFS with the requested information, and the school advised him that, being oversubscribed that year, it was unlikely his son could be offered a place. He then unsuccessfully appealed for reconsideration of his application.

In July 2008, the father sought to prosecute JFS on the grounds of racial discrimination, but High Court judge, Mr Justice Munby, ruled against him, holding JFS' selection criteria were not intrinsically different from Christian or Islamic faith schools and their being declared illegal could adversely affect "the admission arrangements in a very large number of faith schools of many different faiths and denominations".

The Court of Appeal, however, in June 2009 declared that JFS, under the Race Relations Act 1976, had illegally discriminated against the child on grounds of race. They ruled that the mother's religious status, and thus her child's religious status, had been determined using a racial criterion rather than a religious criterion. The school subsequently issued revised admissions criteria based on religious practice including synagogue attendance, formal Jewish education and volunteering. JFS and the United Synagogue appealed to the Supreme Court, with the support of the Chief Rabbi Jonathan Sacks. On 16 December 2009, the UK Supreme Court upheld the Court of Appeal's ruling.

== Alleged 2026 antisemitic incident ==
In March 2026, Norfolk Police initiated a hate-crime investigation following an under-15 football match between JFS and Thorpe St Andrew School in Norwich during the quarterfinal round of a national tournament, in which antisemitic slurs such as "Dirty Jews" and "Go back to the gas chambers" were said to have been shouted from the stands at players by a crowd that consisted primarily of supporters of the Norwich school. Later the same month, the police reported that they had not been able to verify the allegations, and were not taking further action.

== Notable former pupils ==
- Barney Barnato (1851–1897) – Randlord
- Gina Bellman (born 1966) – actress
- Raphael Benjamin (1846–1906) – rabbi in Australia and America
- Eyal Booker (born 1995) – Love Island contestant
- Selig Brodetsky (1888–1954) – mathematician, Zionist leader, and president of the Hebrew University of Jerusalem
- Benjamin Cohen (born 1982), journalist and Channel 4 News presenter
- Two-Gun Cohen (1887–1970) – British and Canadian adventurer who became aide-de-camp to Sun Yat-sen and a major-general in the Chinese National Revolutionary Army
- Dean Furman (born 1988) – professional footballer
- Maurice Glasman (born 1961), academic, social thinker and Labour life peer
- Jonathan Glazer – BAFTA and Oscar award-winning film director
- Iddo Goldberg – actor best known for playing Freddie Thorne in Peaky Blinders
- Samuel Gompers – first president of the American Federation of Labor
- Ray Kelvin – founder of luxury clothing retail company Ted Baker
- Josh Kennet (born 1987) – English-Israeli footballer
- David Joseph – chairman and CEO of Universal Music UK
- Bernard Lewis – founder and owner, River Island
- Joe Loss – musician
- Jake Marlowe (1997–2023) – bassist of hardcore band Desolated, killed in the Nova music festival massacre
- Ofra Offer Oren – Israeli writer, poet, blogger and translator
- Steven Reingold – cricketer
- Barbara Roche – Labour politician
- Dan Rothman – guitarist for London Grammar
- Joel Samuels – DJ, associated with DJ Luck & MC Neat
- Jez San – game designer, Argonaut Games
- Florence Schechter – founder of Vagina Museum and author
- Ian Stone – comedian
- Annie Henrietta Yorke – temperance reformer, philanthropist and author
- Israel Zangwill
