= Henry Vidaver =

Polish-American rabbi, publisher and orator

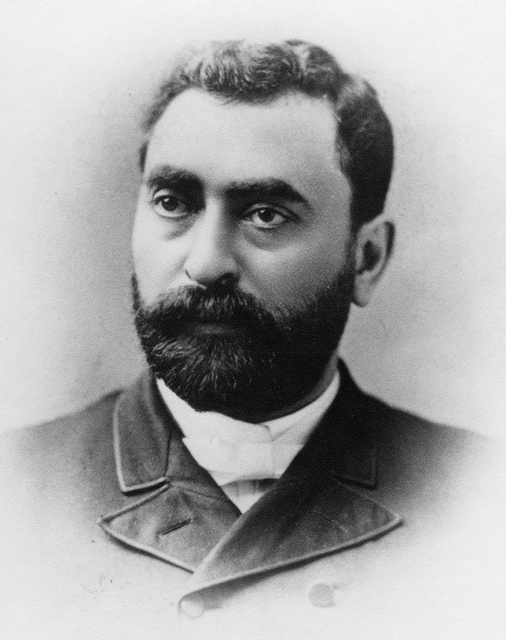
Rabbi Henry G. Vidaver

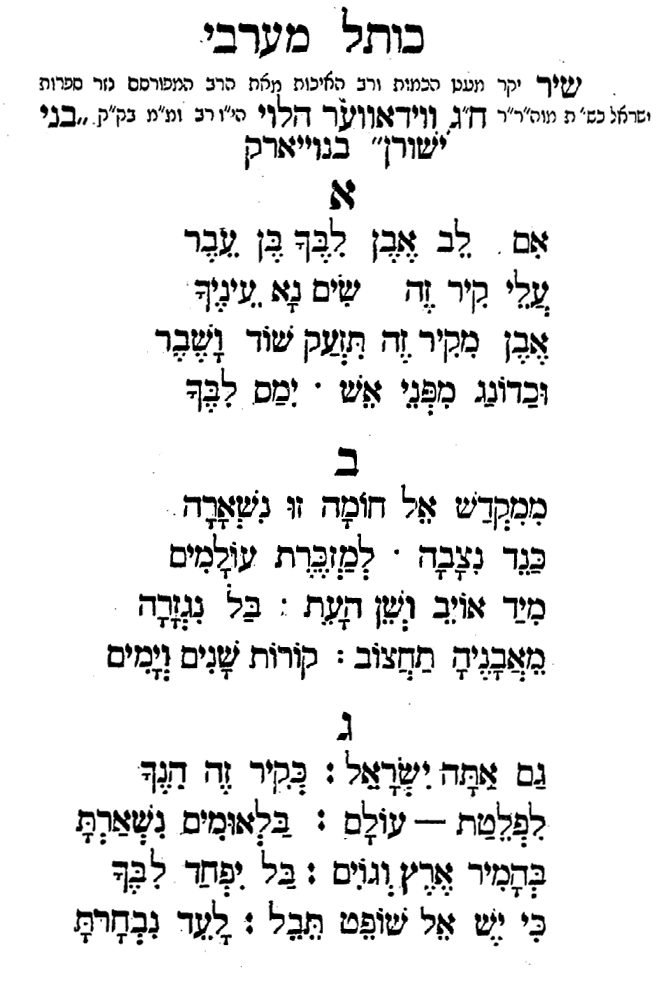
poem of Vidaver in Hebrew about the Western Wall in Jerusalem, published in Havatzelet newspaper, March 31, 1871

Henry (Hebrew: חיים גרשון romanized: Chayim Gershon) Vidaver (1833 in Warsaw, Poland – 14 September 1882 in San Francisco, California) was a prominent rabbi, publisher, Hebraist, and orator in America.

== Biography ==
In 1859, Vidaver immigrated to the United States, and became the rabbi of Congregation Rodeph Shalom in Philadelphia. In 1861 he resigned his position and moved to Germany then returned to the U.S. in 1865 to become rabbi of United Hebrew Congregation in St. Louis, Missouri where he withdrew his support for the Confederacy and wrote in praise of Abraham Lincoln. In 1868, he assumed the pulpit of the B'nai Jeshurun in New York City and from 1874 until his death in 1882 served as rabbi of Congregation Sherith Israel in San Francisco.

Vidaver and Jacob Levinski co-authored the first abridged Hebrew Bible, which was published in 1869. He also commonly published poems in Hebrew about Jerusalem and other Jewish issues in Hebrew newspapers, such as Havatzelet.
