= Aaron J. Messing =

Aaron J. Messing (June 18, 1840 – September 23, 1916) was a German-American rabbi who ministered primarily in San Francisco and Chicago.

== Life ==
Messing was born on June 18, 1840, in Gniewkowo, Prussia. His father Joseph Messing was a Talmudist, exegete, and rabbi who wrote a number of Jewish books. His brothers Mayer and Henry were also rabbis.

Messing was educated in Breslau and Graetz. He received a Ph.D. from the University of Rostock in Mecklenburg. He was ordained a rabbi by Rabbi E. Gutmacher, Rabbi M. Feilchenfeld, Rabbi N. Caro. He then served as rabbi in Militsch, Silesia as well as in Mecklenburg-Schwerin. He later immigrated to America, and in 1866 he was named rabbi of Beth Israel Bikur Cholim in New York City, New York. In 1868, he became rabbi of the B'nai Shalom Congregation in Chicago, Illinois. In 1870, he became rabbi of Congregation Sherith Israel in San Francisco, California. Over the course of the next two decades, he founded at least twelve congregations and twenty three Sunday schools in Nevada, Oregon, and California. He also wrote several popular Sunday school textbooks, namely "A Hebrew Primer" and "The Jewish Catechism." In 1890, he went back to Chicago and again served as rabbi of B'nai Shalom. He served as rabbi there until his death.

In 1870, Messing married Fannie Livingston. Their children were Mrs. Minna Levy of San Francisco, Mrs. H. H. Mitchell of Chicago, Mrs. David Livingstone of Kankakee, Illinois, Mrs. Hebert Ullman of New York, Mrs. Theodore Loberman of Montgomery, Alabama, Herman J. Messing of New York, Sigmund Messing of Los Angeles, and Rabbi Abraham J. Messing. Abraham was also a rabbi who ministered in Alabama and Illinois.

Messing died at his daughter's home on September 23, 1916. He was buried in the Jewish Graceland Cemetery.
