= Léon Hollaenderski =

- Born: Leib ben David Hollaenderski; 1808; Vishtinets, Lomzha Department, Duchy of Warsaw
- Died: 20 December 1878 (aged 69–70); Paris, French Third Republic
- Writing career
- Pen name: Léon Holland, Léon Hollander, Léon Hollaender, H. I.
- Language: French
- Notable work: Les israélites de Pologne (1846)

Léon Hollaenderski (Yiddish: ליב בן דוד האָללאֶנדערסקי, romanized: Leib ben David Hollaenderski; 1808 – 20 December 1878) was a Polish-born Jewish author, translator, and poet.

== Biography ==
Léon Hollaenderski was born in the town of Vishtinets, and studied at the University of Königsberg in Prussia. He was appointed an interpreter at the tribunal of Suwalki, and in 1835 founded there the first printing and lithographic establishment in the government, as well as three bookstores. When his bookkeeper revealed to the police that he owned Polish patriotic publications, Hollaenderski's property was confiscated and he was forced to flee. He arrived in Paris with his wife in 1843, where he joined the intellectual circles of the Great Emigration.

Through the recommendation of François Arago he obtained a position in one of the railroad offices, and employed his leisure time in literary pursuits, which gave him in later years considerable reputation as a philosopher, moralist, historian, and bibliographer.

In exile, Hollaenderski was active in efforts to bring about rapprochement between Poles and Jews, and maintained underground contacts with revolutionary Jews in Poland. He broke with the Polish independence movement after émigré groups held Galician Jews partly to blame for the crushing of the Kraków uprising of 1846, and in July 1837 withdrew in protest from a committee established by Adam Jerzy Czartoryski to foster pro-Polish attitudes among Jews. Nonetheless, during the Greater Poland uprising of 1848, Hollaenderski issued appeals to Poles (2 April 1848) and Polish Jews (6 April 1848), calling for co-operation between the two groups. The latter appeal called on the "teachers of Israel" to preach patriotism to the Jews and to prove that they are not indifferent to Poland's fate, assuring them that their "faithful participation in Poland's victory will bring eternal happiness to entire Jewry."

== Publications ==
Inspired by the writings of Joachim Lelewel, Hollaenderski released Les israélites de Pologne in 1846, the first extensive history in book form of the Jews in Poland in a western language, with a foreword by radical Polish émigré Jan Czyński. A translation of the study appeared in German that same year, with an epilogue by Zecharias Frankel; the work was published in English as The History of the Israelites of Poland in 1865.

As family poet of the Rothschild family in France, Hollaenderski composed an epithalamium on the occasion of the marriage of Alphonse de Rothschild to his cousin Leonora de Rothschild in 1857, and poems in honour of the bar mitzvah of Edmond James de Rothschild, the wedding of Gustave de Rothschild to Cécile Anspach in 1858, and the death of James Mayer de Rothschild in 1868.

His other published works include Céline la nièce de l'abbé (1832); Trilogie philosophique et populaire, a romance in which are faithfully depicted the Polish customs of that time; Dix-huit siècles de prejugés chrétiens; Dictionnaire universel français-hébreu; L'exemple, an essay on morals; and "Israël et sa vocation," published in Archives israélites (Paris, 1863–64). Besides these works, Hollaenderski was the author of the poems "Méditations d'un proscrit polonais", "La liberté de franc-maçons", and "Lamentation de juifs polonais sous Nicolas 1er." He also translated into French Abraham ibn Ezra's treatise on chess, Ma'adanne melekh, under the title of Délices royales ou le jeu des échecs; Mémoire de Kilinsky from the Polish; and the third part of Berakhot (Paris, 1871). Hollaenderski's numerous contributions to periodical literature as well as his works appeared variously under the names of "Holland," "Hollander," "Hollaender," and "H. I."
