= Moritz Spitz =

American rabbi (1848–1920)

Rabbi Moritz Spitz

Personal life
- Born: October 14, 1848 Csaba, Hungary
- Died: 1920
- Education: University of Prague

Religious life
- Religion: Judaism

Moritz Spitz (October 14, 1848 – 1920) was an American rabbi.

== Biography ==
Spitz was born on October 14, 1848, in Csaba, Hungary. He was educated at the University of Prague, and received his rabbinical diploma from Rabbi Judah Teweles, from Prague.

From 1870 to 1871, Spitz served as rabbi of the Congregation of B'nai Sholom in Chicago, Illinois.

From 1871 to 1878, Spitz served as rabbi of the Congregation of Emanu-El, in Milwaukee, Wisconsin.

Spitz contributed to The American Israelite and Die Deborah under the nom de plume Ben Abi.

Spitz organised the Shoe Fund, to provide basic necessities for children in St. Louis, Missouri.

Spitz died in 1920.
