= Mayer Messing =

German-American rabbi

Mayer Messing (December 10, 1843 – January 30, 1930) was a German-American rabbi who ministered in Indianapolis, Indiana for forty years.

== Life ==
Messing was born on December 10, 1843, in Gniewkowo, Prussia, the son of Rabbi Joseph Messing. His brothers Aaron J. Messing and Henry J. Messing were also rabbis.

Messing was educated in Graetz. He was ordained a rabbi by Rabbi E. Gutmacher, Dr. Poper of Charnikow, and Dr. Cohen of Schwerin. He then served as rabbi of Neubukow, Mecklenburg-Schwerin, and Aken-on-the-Elbe. He served in the German army during the Austro-Prussian War and left the army after the war. One day during his military service, he was reading an issue of the Cincinnati paper Die Deborah a friend sent him when he saw that the Indianapolis Hebrew Congregation in Indianapolis, Indiana wanted a rabbi. Anxious to leave his military service, he answered the ad, sent the congregation his picture, and was named rabbi over 93 other applicants.

Messing immigrated to America and began serving as rabbi of the Indianapolis Hebrew Congregation in 1867. The Congregation was initially Orthodox, but under him it became Reform. Active in charity, he served as secretary of the Hebrew Ladies' Relief Society for at least twenty years. By 1888, one source described him as the principal and best known rabbi in Indiana. By 1904, he served as rabbi for 37 years, the longest a rabbi served a single American congregation at the time. Shortly after arriving in Indianapolis he instituted Friday evening services, a daily Hebrew class, and a Sabbath school for children after Saturday morning services. He was also first president of the local Humane Society and a board member of the Industrial Home for the Blind, the Fresh Air Mission, and the Indiana Red Cross. He retired as rabbi in 1907.

Messing was a prominent Freemason and B'nai B'rith member. He officiated at Mackinac Island and Petoskey while vacationing there for decades, and following his retirement he officiated at Long Beach, California. In 1868, he married Ricka Naphtali. Their children were Dora (wife of M. S. Meyberg), Esther (wife of Isaac Rice), Emma (secretary of the United States Embassy in Berlin, the first woman appointed to such a position), Abraham Lincoln, Samuel, Sara (wife of Leon Stern), and Josephine (wife of Jack Harding).

Messing died at his daughter Josephine Harding's home on January 30, 1930. He was buried in the Indianapolis Hebrew Congregation Cemetery following a funeral service at the Congregation.
