= Messing Around =

Mess Around or Messing Around or variants may refer to:

- "Mess Around", song by Ray Charles
- "Mess Around" (Cage the Elephant song)
- "Mess Around" (Forest Claudette song)
- "Mess Around" (Redd Kross song)
- "Messed Around", song by Squeeze
- "Mess Around", song by Moka Only and Chief from Crickets, 2011

Messing Around or Messin' Around

- "Messin' Around" (Memphis Slim song), R&B chart No. 1 hit by Memphis Slim, 1948
- "Messin' Around" (Pitbull song), song by Pitbull featuring Enrique Iglesias, 2016
- "Messin' Around", instrumental by drummer Max Roach and trumpeter Dizzy Gillespie from Max + Dizzy: Paris 1989
- "Messin Around", song by Andre Nickatina from Unreleased
- "Messin' Around", song by Sebadoh from Bubble & Scrape, 1993
- Messin' Around, jazz album by Molly Johnson, 2006 (nominated at the Juno Awards of 2007)

== See also ==
- "Stop Messin' Round", by Fleetwood Mac
