= Emma Messing =

American diplomat (1872–1950)

Emma Messing (October 29, 1872 – April 21, 1950) was a Jewish-American stenographer, vaudeville actress, and the first American woman to work abroad at an American embassy.

== Early life and education ==
Messing was born on October 29, 1872, in Indianapolis, Indiana, the daughter of Rabbi Mayer Messing (the rabbi of the Indianapolis Hebrew Congregation) and Rieckchen "Ricca." Messing graduated from the Indianapolis High School in 1889. In 1903, she started taking courses at the Bush Conservatory of Music.

== Drama career ==
By 1896, Messing was working as a stenographer, an in-demand job in the state capital, and her translation skills were useful for the city's large German immigration population. In 1905, she and her sister Josephine went into vaudeville as the Southern Sisters, with Emma going by June Southern and Josephine by Jo Southern. They had a novelty act called "The Living Song Sheet," their Chicago debut was a hit, and their parents approved their daughters' entering show business. But Josephine became seriously sick that winter and they had to cancel their 1906 shows.

In 1910, Messing went to New York City and began studying at the American Academy of Dramatic Arts. In 1911, she signed a contract with theatrical managers George M. Cohan and Sam H. Harris to act in their Broadway play Get-Rich-Quick Wallingford. She then spent the next three years performing The Fortune Hunter all over the country. In 1915, she went West and was in charge of the music at the Indiana Building in the Panama–Pacific International Exposition in San Francisco. She returned to Indianapolis in 1916 and started doing public readings for plays like John Galsworthy's Justice and Marion Craig Wentworth's War Brides.

== Diplomatic career ==
In 1918, during World War I, Messing went to Washington, D.C. to work with the Commission on Training Camp Activities. In 1921, she was appointed secretary to the United States Consulate in Prague, Czechoslovakia, but before she left she was reassigned to the American commissioner in Berlin; at the time America had not yet reestablished an American embassy. This made her the first American woman appointed to a foreign office. In 1922, she was promoted to the American Embassy in Berlin. She was stationed in Berlin for 18 years, during which time she did what she could to aid people in need with a large part of her own salary, including Jews suffering under rising antisemitism. She was still in Berlin when Nazi Germany rose to power, and at one point Ambassador William Dodd complained that there were too many Jews (like Messing) on his staff, although she was still in the embassy when Dodd left in 1937.

Messing left Germany in September 1939, during the Invasion of Poland and the start of World War II, and was reassigned to the American Embassy in Stockholm. There, she assisted with the influx of American citizens escaping Poland, Finland, and Norway. At some point after the end of the Winter War in March 1940, she ended her career with the United States Foreign Service and began a long and circuitous journey home, arriving in New York on the SS Excalibur on December 18, 1940.

== Advocacy ==
Starting in March 1941, Messing began giving speeches about what she saw in Nazi Germany, including Hitler's rise to power, the persecutions of Jews, and testimony from early concentration camp prisoners who were able to be released. Before her first speech, she was asked by several women not to "exaggerate the atrocities," only to respond that the newspapers weren't reporting a hundredth of the whole story. She spoke at clubs and organizations in Indianapolis and beyond. When Charles Lindbergh gave his antisemitic Des Moines speech in September 1941, she claimed there was a "strange similarity" between him and Hitler and recalled being in Berlin during Lindbergh's 1938 visit to Germany. She continued speaking about Germany after America entered World War II following the Attack on Pearl Harbor, and after the war she wrote an opinion piece for The Indianapolis Star arguing that "thousands upon thousands" of Nazis should be executed instead of the 25 to 300 the Allies were planning to put on trial.

== Personal life ==
Messing was once engaged to entrepreneur Carl G. Fisher, despite previously promising her mother she wouldn't marry a non-Jew. But in 1909 Fisher met his future wife Jane Watts, the engagement was broken, and Messing fled Indianapolis for eight months on a trip with her father to Europe and the Holy Land. Messing and Fisher remained on good terms until his death in 1939, and he helped her provide financial aid to others while she was in Germany. She never married. She spent many years with Lilly Timm, a Danish colleague at the Embassy in Berlin. They went to America together in 1941, lived together, and regularly traveled together to visit Messing's relatives. They knew each other since at least 1933, when Timm accompanied Messing on a visit to America, and Timm was still attending Messing family gatherings years after Emma's death.

Messing died at home on April 21, 1950. Rabbi Ferdinand Isserman conducted her funeral service at the Aaron Rubin Funeral Home. She was buried at the Indianapolis Hebrew Cemetery.
