= Free Sons of Israel =

Fraternal benefit organization

The Free Sons of Israel, is a fraternal organization that was established in 1849 to aid Jewish refugees from the Revolutions of 1848.

== Grandmasters ==
- Marcus Krauskopf, rabbi of Congregation Shearith Israel
- Leon Cohen (1963).
- Harry Rabinowitz of Shenorock, New York (1960).
