= Jacob Lampert =

Jacob Lampert, holding a cigar box

Jacob Lampert (1856 in London – 1921 in St. Louis, Missouri) was a wealthy cigar manufacturer based in St. Louis, Missouri.

== Biography ==
He was born in London in 1856 as the son of Dutch parents. The family immigrated to the U.S., first to Pittsburgh, then Detroit, then finally St. Louis, In the 1880 census, Jacob (24) is listed as living at his parents' place in St. Louis, where his father, Moses Lampert, originally spelled Lamport, born 1827, cigar maker, is still head of the household.

In 1912, Jacob was elected Grand Master of the Masons of St. Louis.

In 1921, he died and left his entire estate to his younger sister, Rosa Lampert. At that time, it paid the largest estate tax in Missouri. The estate par value was over $1.2 million in 1921. Eleven nephews and nieces contested the will, from both the Geist family and the Van Raalte family. They claimed that Rosa had poisoned the mind of Jacob against them. She offered the nephews and nieces $50,000 to share if they would not litigate, but they went ahead with the lawsuit. In the end, Rosa Lampert prevailed, and won the entire amount.

There were dozens of articles in the St. Louis Post-Dispatch newspaper about the trial, including front page articles.

Rosa Lampert married and became Rosa Lampert Graff. She was a major philanthropist.

The cigar best seller was called Flor de Lampert.

== Sources ==
- Census data from familysearch.org
