= United Hebrew Congregation (Chesterfield, Missouri) =

Reform synagogue in St. Louis, Missouri, United States

- Location in Missouri

Religion
- Affiliation: Reform Judaism
- Ecclesiastical or organizational status: Synagogue
- Leadership: Rabbi Brigitte Rosenberg; Rabbi David Reinhart (Associate); Rabbi Howard Kaplansky (Emeritus)
- Status: Active

Location
- Location: 13788 Conway Road, Chesterfield, St. Louis, Missouri 63141
- Country: United States
- Interactive map of United Hebrew Congregation
- Coordinates: 38°38′52″N 90°30′35″W

Architecture
- Architect: Pietro Belluschi
- Type: Synagogue
- Style: Modernist
- Established: 1841 (as a congregation)
- Completed: 1857 (Sixth Street); 1879 (21st and Olive Sts.); 1903 (Kingshighway); 1927 (South Skinker); 1989 (Conway Road)

Website
- unitedhebrew.org

The United Hebrew Congregation (also Congregation Achdut Yisroel) is a Reform Jewish synagogue located at 13788 Conway Road in Chesterfield, a western suburb of St. Louis, Missouri, in the United States. It was the first Jewish Congregation established west of the Mississippi River.

== History ==
=== 19th century ===
The United Hebrew Congregation formed on Erev Rosh Hashannah, the evening of September 29, 1837, when ten members rented a room in St. Louis for services. The location was either above a store called "Max's Grocery and Restaurant" at Second and Spruce Streets, or an "R.A. Mack's" grocery store at 54 N. Front Street. The exact year this minyan was organized has not been definitely determined. (Note: Makovsky writes that the date is between 1836 and 1838; while Ehrlich maintains that it was definitely 1836.)

Abraham Weigel, who was to become United Hebrew Congregation's first president, and Nathan Abeles, the first secretary, rented a room over a grocery and held the first minyan in St. Louis. Louis Bomeisler, a German from Philadelphia, probably conducted the first service in St. Louis for Rosh Hashanah on September 29. He proceeded to order a Torah, prayer books, and Taleisim for the new group.

Twelve men met four years later at the Oracle Coffee House at 2nd and Locust to write the constitution for Achdut Yisrael, the United Hebrew Congregation. In 1841, a constitution was adopted based on the laws of Shulhan Aruch, which governs Orthodox synagogues, and United Hebrew was formally founded, the first Jewish congregation west of the Mississippi.

United Hebrew established its first home in 1848 in the former North Baptist Church on Fifth Street near Green Street (now Broadway) between Washington and Lucas.

United Hebrew Congregation nearly merged with B'nai El in 1852, but the merger was called off when B'nai El received an unanticipated gift from the estate of Judah Touro, a Jewish philanthropist from New Orleans. The bequest totaled $3,000 (equivalent to $116,000 in 2025). In 1855, B'nai El used the funds to build a synagogue at Sixth and Cerre, which may have been the first synagogue building constructed west of the Mississippi River.

In 1854, United Hebrew Congregation hired the first documented rabbi to serve in St. Louis, Rabbi Bernard Illowy. His term of service lasted about one year, and in 1856, he left for Syracuse.

On June 11, 1853, United Hebrew Congregation formed plans for the construction of a new building. B'nai El's new building probably encouraged the construction, but perhaps more important was the expiration of United Hebrew Congregation's lease. On August 10, 1855, United Hebrew Congregation bought a 48 by 90 feet (15 by 27 m) lot near the corner of Sixth and St. Charles for $6,240 (equivalent to $216,000 in 2025). At the time, United Hebrew Congregation not only had a cantor but it also employed a shohet to slaughter animals in accordance with kashrut so that local Jewish families would have kosher meat available to eat. In 1857, the congregation moved to a new building next to the Benton Public School on Sixth Street between Locust and St. Charles. The building was built by Joseph Hodgeman, who had recently built a new hospital wing. It had a circular-shaped skylight in its center with a star of David in its designs. The building was ultimately built for $22,000 (equivalent to $788,000 in 2025. It was consecrated on June 17, 1859, with Rabbi Morris J. Raphall of New York officiating. At the time, there were approximately 600 to 700 Jewish people living in St. Louis, of which about 150 to 200 were members of United Hebrew Congregation.

In 1880, United Hebrew Congregation's moved the dead bodies buried at its original burial ground at Jefferson Avenue and Gratiot Street to a new cemetery at Mount Olive near Clayton. The old burial ground had been established in 1837 and was a small lot of approximately 100 by 200 feet (30 by 61 m), with relatively shallow graves that often contained multiple dead bodies.

=== 20th century ===
United Hebrew moved steadily westward, next to Twenty-first and Olive Streets in 1879, and then in 1903 into a remodeled Mount Cabanne Church at the southwest corner of Kingshighway and Von Versen (after 1917, Enright).

In 1927, the United Hebrew Congregation dedicated a new home at 225 S. Skinker. Designed by the architectural firm of Maritz and Young with consulting architect Gabriel Ferrand, the notable, Byzantine revival structure was said to be one of the three largest synagogues in the nation. The United Hebrew Congregation worshiped there for 62 years until 1989. An educational building, also designed by Maritz and Young, was added in the early 1950s. The Missouri Historical Society purchased the historic Skinker building in early 1989. It is now the Society's library and research center.

As its membership continued to move to the suburbs, United Hebrew Congregation purchased land at Conway and Woods Mill Roads in the West St. Louis County suburbs of Town and Country and Chesterfield, Missouri. The Religious and Hebrew schools began operating there in 1977. The administration and sanctuary moved to the Conway site after the construction (1986–1989) of a notable Pietro Belluschi building.

=== 21st century ===
Logo of the United Hebrew Congregation

The United Hebrew Congregation is a member of the Union for Reform Judaism. It is the furthest west large reform congregation in Greater St. Louis. The congregation contains a religious school, Hebrew school, early childhood center, and summer camp. Programs include youth (including a North American Federation of Temple Youth group called UHTYG, adult education, and bible study. The congregation is a member of the Synaplex initiative.

The senior rabbi is Brigitte Rosenberg. Ronald Eichaker serves as cantor. Rick Recht is the artist in residence. The rabbi emeritus is Howard Kaplansky. The cantor emeritus is Murray Hochberg.

== Torah ==
In 2006, United Hebrew Congregation commissioned a Torah to be written by a woman soferet. On September 9, 2007, the Torah was dedicated, and Jen Taylor Friedman became the first woman known to have written a complete Torah scroll.

== Rabbinic leaders ==
United Hebrew Congregation's rabbinic leaders have been as follows.

Name	Years
Rabbi Bernard Illowy	1854–1856
Rabbi Isaac Ritterman	1860; 1864–1865; 1869–1870
Rabbi Henry Kuttner	1857; 1870–1875
Rabbi Moritz Treichenberg	1875–1878?
Rabbi Henry J. Messing	1878–1911
Dr. Goodman Lipkind	1912–1914
Rabbi Samuel Thurman	1914–1958
Rabbi Jerome W. Grollman	1958–1990
Rabbi Howard G. Kaplansky	1990–2011
Rabbi Brigitte Rosenberg	2011–present
