= The Occident and American Jewish Advocate =

First American Jewish periodical

The Occident and American Jewish Advocate or simply The Occident (1843-1869), was the first general Jewish periodical published in the United States. The only earlier periodical, Solomon Henry Jackson's The Jew, was published as an anti-missionary journal.

Compiled by Rabbi Isaac Leeser from inception through 1868, in 1869 the publication was edited by Mayer Sulzberger. Sulzberger, a successful attorney was a disciple of Leeser's in his youth. Leeser hoped Sulzberger would enter the rabbinate, but Sulzberger chose a career in law instead, but pledged to Leeser that he would edit the Occident for a year, which he fulfilled after Leeser's death.

A monthly publication, the Occident did print weekly between April 1859 and March 1861 until returning to the monthly format. It contained a broad array of contents, including sermons, obituaries, juvenile literature, scholarly research, theology, spiritual poetry, domestic and foreign news of Jewish interest, resolutions adopted by congregations and organizations, book reviews and correspondence. The Occident is one of the most important records of American Jewish life in the middle decades of the 19th century.

Over ten years worth of this news monthly have been transcribed and are available for reading online.

== Literature ==
- Jewish Encyclopedia entry for The Occident and American Jewish Advocate
- Kiron, Arthur (1994). "The Mayer Sulzberger Collection Finding Aid". University of Pennsylvania Libraries. Archived from the original on August 25, 2004.
- Goldman, Yosef, Hebrew Printing in America, YGBooks 2006. ISBN 978-1-59975-685-1.
