= Bob Haas =

Executive of clothing company

Robert D. Haas
- Born: 1942 (age 83–84); San Francisco, California, US
- Education: University of California, Berkeley; Harvard Business School
- Occupations: Businessman; Philanthropist
- Known for: President and CEO, Levi Strauss & Co.
- Spouse: Colleen Gershon
- Children: 1
- Parents: Evelyn Danzig Haas; Walter A. Haas Jr.
- Family: Walter J. Haas (brother); Peter E. Haas Jr. (cousin); Jerome Alan Danzig (uncle); Sarah Palfrey (aunt)

Robert D. Haas (born April 3, 1942) is the chairman emeritus of Levi Strauss & Co., son of Walter A. Haas Jr., and the great-great-grandnephew of the company's founder, Levi Strauss. Haas served as the company's president and CEO (1984-1999) and chairman (1989-2008), and is the last descendant of Levi Strauss to serve in those positions.

== Biography ==
Haas was born and raised in San Francisco, the son of Walter A. Haas Jr. and Evelyn Danzig Haas. Haas has two siblings: Elizabeth Jane "Betsy" Haas Eisenhardt (married to Roy Eisenhardt); and Walter J. Haas, co-chairman of the Evelyn and Walter Haas Jr. Fund and former chairman and CEO of the Oakland Athletics.

Haas received a Bachelor of Arts from the University of California, Berkeley in 1964, where he was Phi Beta Kappa, and a Master of Business Administration (MBA) from Harvard Graduate School of Business in 1968, where he was named a Baker Scholar.

Haas served in the Peace Corps in the Ivory Coast from 1964 to 1966. He was a White House Fellow from 1968 to 1969. After business school, Haas worked as an associate at McKinsey & Company from 1969 to 1972.

Haas joined Levi Strauss & Co. in 1973 and worked in a variety of roles. He was elected to the board of directors in 1979 and as president and chief executive officer in 1984, until he stepped down in 1999. He served as chairman of the board from 1989 until 2008, and retired from the board in 2014.

Sales and profitability grew during the period of Haas's leadership, thanks largely to the expansion of Levi's branded apparel internationally and the creation and rapid growth of the Dockers brand of casual apparel. Under his leadership, Levi Strauss & Company carried on the company's engagement in corporate social responsibility: it became the first company to define and enforce workplace and safety standards for employees.

From his appointment as CEO in 1984, Haas was instrumental in redefining the company's business strategy: He created a flatter organization – including the reduction of the workforce by one third. He also invested heavily in new product development, marketing, and technology.

In 1985, Haas returned the company to private ownership. At the time it was announced, the Levi's LBO was the largest in U.S. business history.

During his tenure, Haas built upon the ethical traditions of Levi's. During the Great Depression of the 1930s, Robert's grandfather, Walter A. Haas Sr., and great uncle, Daniel E. Koshland Sr., refused to lay off idled employees, risking bankruptcy. Instead they created work projects such as laying wooden floors in the company's factory in San Francisco. Walter Haas Jr. and his brother Peter insisted on running integrated factories in the American South, giving equal treatment to all races during the era of segregation. During his tenure as leader at Levi Strauss, Haas tried to create a corporate culture in which tens of thousands of employees around the world were treated fairly and well. In addition, the company led the way in addressing a range of social and business issues. In 1982, the company became the first prominent business to become involved in addressing the problems of HIV/AIDS, at the time a largely unknown disease. Under his leadership the company pioneered corporate standards for dealing with HIV-positive employees and created employee AIDS awareness programs. Since the early 1980s the Levi Strauss Foundation has donated over US$60 million to AIDS-oriented non-profits. In 1991 Haas was the first person to be awarded the Edward N. Brandt Jr. Award from the National Leadership Coalition on AIDS for his significant efforts in the fight against HIV and AIDS in the workplace.

In 1992, Levi Strauss became the first Fortune 500 company to extend health-care benefits to the unmarried partners of its employees, starting the acceptance of this practice by other leading companies. In that same year the company published the first-ever corporate standards governing the treatment of employees in contractor factories around the world. Since then, these guidelines have been largely adopted by the apparel and footwear industries.

== Philanthropy ==
Active in support of his alma mater, he endowed the Haas Scholars Program at Berkeley, which funds financial aid eligible, academically talented undergraduates to engage in a sustained research, field-study or creative project in the summer before and during their senior year at Berkeley. Each year, twenty Haas Scholars are selected from all disciplines and departments across the university on the basis of the merit and originality of their project proposals. He was a member of Berkeley's Board of Visitors, national giving chair for the Campaign for Berkeley, a board member of the Haas School, and, in 2007, the recipient of the Chancellor's Award. In 2008, Berkeley established the Robert D. Haas Chancellor’s Chair in Equity and Inclusion in his honor. He is a trustee of the Evelyn and Walter Haas Jr. Fund, a San Francisco-based private family foundation established in 1953 with the goal to form a righteous and supportive society that offers basic rights and opportunities to all people. Haas joined the fund's board of directors in 1992 and is chair of the audit committee. He is a former member of the Trilateral Commission, trustee of the Ford Foundation, member of the Council on Foreign Relations, and honorary trustee of the Brookings Institution, the California Business Roundtable and the Bay Area Council. In addition, Haas is the former chairman of Stanford's Humanities and Sciences Council as well as the former president of the Levi Strauss Foundation. He is also a donor and supporter of Immigrants Rising.

== Accolades ==
In 1998, President Bill Clinton honored Haas with the first annual Ron Brown Leadership Award in recognition of the company's anti-racism initiative called "Project Change".

In 2009, Haas was selected as the Alumnus of the Year of the University of California, Berkeley.

== Personal life ==
In 1974, he married attorney Colleen Gershon; they have a daughter, Elise.

== See also ==
- Haas School of Business at University of California, Berkeley
- League of Women Voters
