= Walter Haas =

Walter Haas may refer to:

- Walter A. Haas (1889–1979), president and chairman of Levi Strauss & Co.
- Walter A. Haas Jr. (1916–1995), president and chairman of Levi Strauss & Co., son of Walter A. Haas.
- Walter de Haas or Hanns Günther (1886–1969), German author, translator and editor
- Walter H. Haas (1917–2015), founder of Association of Lunar and Planetary Observers
- Walter F. Haas (1869–1936), city attorney of Los Angeles, California
- Walter J. Haas, American businessman and former president of the Oakland Athletics
