= Walter J. Haas =

American businessman

- Born: Walter Jerome Haas
- Other name: Wally Haas
- Occupation: Businessman
- Known for: Former President of the Oakland Athletics
- Spouse: Julie Salles
- Children: 3
- Parent(s): Evelyn Danzig Haas; Walter A. Haas Jr.
- Family: Robert D. Haas (brother); Roy Eisenhardt (brother-in-law); Walter A. Haas (grandfather); Abraham Haas (great-grandfather); Simon Koshland (great-great-grandfather); Jerome Alan Danzig (uncle); Sarah Palfrey (aunt)

Walter J. Haas is an American businessman and former president of the Oakland Athletics (1990–1992) and co-chairman of the Evelyn and Walter Haas Jr. Fund.

== Biography ==
Haas was born the son of Evelyn (née Danzig) and Walter A. Haas Jr. He has two siblings: Robert D. Haas; and Betsy Haas Eisenhardt (married to Roy Eisenhardt).

== Personal life ==
Haas married Julie Salles, a Roman Catholic, in a Unitarian ceremony in Sausalito, California. They have three children: Simone Haas Zumsteg, Charlotte Haas Prime, and Walter A. Haas III.
