= Evelyn Danzig Haas =

American philanthropist (1917–2010)

- Born: Evelyn Danzig; 1917; Elberon, New Jersey, U.S.
- Died: February 3, 2010 (aged 93)
- Education: Wheaton College (B.A.)
- Occupation: Philanthropist
- Spouse: Walter A. Haas Jr.
- Children: 3 (including Bob Haas and Walter J. Haas)
- Family: Jerome Alan Danzig (brother); Sarah Palfrey (sister-in-law)

Evelyn D. Haas (born Evelyn Danzig; 1917 – February 3, 2010) was a San Francisco Bay Area civic leader and philanthropist. She was the co-founder of the Evelyn and Walter Haas Jr. Fund which has contributed more than $364 million to Bay Area cultural, civic, and social service organizations.

== Biography ==
Haas was born Evelyn Danzig in Elberon, New Jersey in 1917. She grew up in New York City and graduated from Wheaton College in Massachusetts. Her father was Jerome J. Danzig, founder of the bond-trading firm J.J. Danzig and former governor of the New York Stock Exchange. Her brother, Jerome Alan Danzig, was an adviser to Governor Nelson A. Rockefeller of New York and was married to tennis star Sarah Palfrey.

Haas met her future husband, Walter A. Haas Jr., while he was attending Harvard Business School. They married and moved to San Francisco in 1940, where they raised their three children: Robert D. Haas, former chairman and CEO of Levi Strauss & Co.; Elizabeth Jane "Betsy" Haas Eisenhardt (married to Roy Eisenhardt); and Walter J. Haas, co-chairman of the Evelyn and Walter Haas Jr. Fund and former chairman and CEO of the Oakland Athletics. Funeral services were held at Congregation Emanu-El in San Francisco.

== Philanthropy ==
Evelyn and her husband Walter founded the Evelyn and Walter Haas Jr. Fund in 1953.

Haas served on the board of the San Francisco Museum of Modern Art. She and her husband helped raise the $95 million needed to build the museum's facility in San Francisco's South of Market (SoMa) area; it opened in 1995.

She was involved in the San Francisco Symphony for more than 40 years and ultimately became a Life Governor of the institution. The Haas Jr. Fund provided the symphony with a $10 million lead challenge grant for the creation of Keeping Score, an initiative anchored by a PBS television series aimed at bringing classical music to American homes and schools.

She and her family spearheaded the restoration of Crissy Field, a former military base, into a 100-acre urban national park. Haas also was an avid fly fisher. She co-authored a book with Gwen Cooper, Wade a Little Deeper, Dear: A Woman's Guide to Fly Fishing in 1979, which became a classic among fly fishers.

Haas was an advocate for the San Francisco Chronicle's annual Season of Sharing Fund, which her husband first launched in partnership with the newspaper in 1986. After his death in 1995, Haas became even more active in the campaign, writing personal letters each year to urge hundreds of friends and colleagues to contribute.
