= Walter A. Haas Jr. =

American businessman (1916–1995)

- Born: January 24, 1916; San Francisco, California, US
- Died: September 20, 1995 (aged 79); San Francisco, California, US
- Education: University of California, Berkeley (BA); Harvard Business School (MBA)
- Known for: CEO of Levi Strauss & Co
- Spouse: Evelyn Danzig Haas
- Children: 3 (including Bob Haas and Walter J. Haas)
- Parent(s): Elise Stern; Walter A. Haas
- Family: Roy Eisenhardt (son-in-law); Peter E. Haas Jr. (cousin); Marc Eugene Meyer (great-grandfather); Jerome Alan Danzig (brother-in-law); Joseph Newmark (great great-grandfather); Simon Koshland (great-grandfather)

Walter A. Haas Jr. (January 24, 1916 – September 20, 1995) was an American businessman. He was the president (1958–1970), CEO (1958–1976) and chairman (1970–1981) of Levi Strauss & Co, succeeding his father Walter A. Haas (1889–1979). He led the company in its growth from a regional manufacturer to one of the world’s leading apparel companies.

In 1953, together with his wife, Evelyn, he founded the Evelyn and Walter Haas Jr. Fund, a private family foundation based in San Francisco. Haas was also the principal owner of the Oakland Athletics of Major League Baseball from 1981 to until his death in 1995.

== Early life and education ==
Haas was born to a Jewish family in San Francisco, the son of Elise (née Stern) and Walter A. Haas. His mother was the daughter of Sigmund Stern (the nephew of Levi Strauss and the son of David Stern); and Rosalie (née Meyer) Stern (the daughter of Harriet Newmark Meyer and Marc Eugene Meyer; and the granddaughter of rabbi Joseph Newmark).

Haas graduated from the University of California, Berkeley in 1937 where he was a member of the Alpha Delta Phi Fraternity. His father was a prominent supporter of the university; the Haas School of Business was named in his honor. Haas attended the Harvard Business School and earned an MBA in 1939.

== Oakland Athletics ==
Haas was the owner of the Oakland Athletics of Major League Baseball, acquiring the team from Charles O. Finley in August 1980 for less than $13 million (equivalent to $51.1 million in 2025) The acquisition was to prevent the team from moving, as Finley had wanted to sell to industrialist Marvin Davis, who planned to move the team to Denver. Under Haas' ownership, the Athletics won five American League West Division titles (the first in 1981 and the last in 1992, advancing to three consecutive World Series between 1988 and 1990, defeating the cross-bay rival San Francisco Giants in 1989 in a sweep marred only by the infamous Loma Prieta earthquake). Haas would accept the Commissioner's Trophy on behalf of himself, the players, and Tony LaRussa, who won his first world championship.

On the date of his death, the organization memorialized Haas with a retirement of his "jersey" due to his services for the organization and the city of Oakland. It remains placed with the jerseys of retired player numbers at the Athletics' current home field.

== Philanthropy ==
Haas sought to strengthen Levi Strauss & Co.’s position as a socially responsible international corporation. During the 1950s, Haas, along with his brother, Peter E. Haas, oversaw racial integration of the company’s plants. He also led the creation of Community Involvement Teams for Levi Strauss & Co. employees. Haas served on the boards of the Ford Foundation and the National Park Foundation while leading Levi Strauss & Co. He was also involved in other nonprofit institutions such as the Hunter’s Point Boys’ Club and the San Francisco Chronicle’s Season of Sharing Fund.

Together with his wife, Haas established the Evelyn and Walter Haas Jr. Fund in 1953 as a private family foundation. As its mission statement describes, the Fund “seeks to fulfill (its) founders’ vision of a just and caring society that provides fundamental rights and opportunities so that all people can live, work and raise their families with dignity.” Of his family’s philanthropy, Haas used to say, "It's in the genes."

== Personal life ==
In 1940, Haas married Evelyn Danzig Haas; they had three children: Robert D. Haas, former chairman and CEO of Levi Strauss & Co.; philanthropist Betsy Haas Eisenhardt who is married to Roy Eisenhardt; and Walter J. Haas, co-chairman of the Evelyn and Walter Haas Jr. Fund and former chairman and CEO of the Oakland Athletics. Haas died at age 79 from prostate cancer at his San Francisco residence. Funeral services were held at Congregation Emanu-El in San Francisco.

== Awards and honors ==
- 1979 – Alumni Achievement Award, Harvard
- 1983 – Alumnus of the Year, University of California
- 1983 – Honorary Degree, Wheaton College
- 1984 – Presidential Voluntary Action Award
- 1989 – Golden Plate Award of the American Academy of Achievement
- 2019 – Athletics Hall of Fame

== See also ==
- Local Ownership for the Athletics: the Haas Era
