= Roy Eisenhardt =

American lawyer (born 1939)

President of Oakland Athletics
- In office 1980–1986

Interim President of San Francisco Art Institute
- In office 2010–2011

Personal details
- Born: Emil Roy Eisenhardt; 1939 (age 86–87) South Orange, New Jersey, U.S.
- Spouse: Betsy Haas
- Children: 2
- Education: Dartmouth College; UC Berkeley School of Law
- Occupation: Businessman, lawyer
- Known for: Former president of the Oakland Athletics

Roy Eisenhardt (born 1939) is an American lawyer and the former president of the Oakland Athletics (A's). He is a member of the Haas family of San Francisco.

== Biography ==
Emil Roy Eisenhardt was born in 1939 in South Orange, New Jersey. He was from a middle-class, Catholic family and grew up in South Orange, New Jersey, the son of Catheryn Thompson and Emil Henry Eisenhardt. His father was the director of purchasing at a local university and his mother was a professor of English and linguistics. His paternal grandfather was an immigrant from Germany. He has one brother and one sister. He attended Columbia High School in Maplewood, New Jersey.

He graduated in 1960 from Dartmouth College in Hanover, New Hampshire. After school he served two years in the United States Marine Corps in Okinawa before returning to the United States to attend law school at UC Berkeley School of Law where he graduated in 1965. He then went to Germany to study tax law.

Upon returning to the United States, he worked in business law at the firm of Farella, Braun, & Martel in San Francisco and then in 1975, he began teaching at UC Berkeley School of Law. In 1980, he served as president of Major League Baseball's Oakland Athletics (until 1986), then owned by his father-in-law, Walter A. Haas Jr. who he had helped to negotiate the purchase of the A's from Charles O. Finley for $12.7 million.

From 2010 to 2011, Eisenhardt succeeded Christopher Bratton and served as the interim president of the San Francisco Art Institute (SFAI).

== Personal life ==
In 1965, he married fellow attorney Auban Slay; they divorced in 1976.

In 1978, he married Betsy Haas, daughter of businessman Walter A. Haas Jr. and Evelyn Danzig Haas. They have two children: Jesse Eisenhardt and Sarah Eisenhardt.
