= Evelyn and Walter Haas Jr. Fund =

American foundation

Evelyn and Walter Hass, Jr. Fund
- Tax ID no.: 94-6068932
- Legal status: 501(c)(3) private foundation
- Headquarters: San Francisco, California, United States
- President: Cathy Cha
- Chair: Walter D. Haas
- Revenue: $459,305,570 (2016)
- Website: www.haasjr.org

The Evelyn and Walter Haas, Jr. Fund is a private foundation established in 1953 by Evelyn D. Haas and Walter A. Haas Jr.

As of 2019, the Fund has awarded nearly $625 million in philanthropic grants.

Based in San Francisco, California, the Haas Fund supports nonprofit organizations and initiatives in five main program areas: Immigrant Rights and Integration; Gay and Lesbian Rights; Education Equity; Nonprofit Leadership; and Community Partnerships and Initiatives.

The foundation supports San Francisco Bay Area institutions such as the University of California, Berkeley and the San Francisco Museum of Modern Art, and local efforts such as the San Francisco Chronicle Season of Sharing Fund and the transformation of Crissy Field from a military base to an urban national park.

== History ==
Haas's great-great-uncle Levi Strauss, an immigrant from Bavaria, arrived in San Francisco in 1853 and started a dry-goods house that grew into a prosperous business and eventually became Levi Strauss & Co. A donor to organizations serving children and the poor, as well as the University of California, Berkeley, Strauss was credited in a 1902 obituary for his "numberless un-ostentatious acts of charity in which neither race nor creed were recognized."

Evelyn and Walter's three children and three grandchildren are the foundation's Board Directors: Walter J. Haas, Robert D. Haas, Betsy Haas Eisenhardt, Elise Haas, Jesse Eisenhardt, and Walter A. Haas.
