= Jerome Alan Danzig =

American reporter (1913–2001)

- Born: Jerome Alan Danzig; February 7, 1913; New York City, U.S.
- Died: July 15, 2001 (aged 88); New York City, U.S.
- Education: Dartmouth College (BA)
- Occupations: Reporter, news producer
- Known for: Adviser to New York Governor Nelson A. Rockefeller
- Spouse: Sarah Palfrey (m. 1951; died 1996)
- Children: 1
- Relatives: Evelyn Danzig Haas (sister); Walter A. Haas Jr. (brother-in-law); Mianne Palfrey (sister-in-law); Polly Palfrey Woodrow (sister-in-law)

Jerome Alan Danzig (February 7, 1913 – July 15, 2001) was an American reporter, news producer, and top adviser to New York Governor Nelson A. Rockefeller.

== Biography ==
Danzig was born on February 7, 1913, in Manhattan, the son of Helen (née Wolf) and Jerome J. Danzig, founder of the bond trading firm J.J. Danzig and former governor of the New York Stock Exchange. He had two siblings: Frank Danzig and Evelyn Danzig Haas (married to Walter A. Haas Jr.) He is a graduate of the Horace Mann School and Dartmouth College. He served in the European Theater of Operations during World War II as a lieutenant commander. In 1935, he worked as a reporter for WOR (AM) in New York, one of the first reporters to broadcast from remote locations. He then worked as a programming executive for both CBS and NBC (1953-1961); at NBC, he produced the Today Show and The Tonight Show with Jack Paar. In 1962, he was named to the staff of Republican New York Governor Nelson A. Rockefeller where he managed all his broadcasting relationships including his failed presidential runs in 1964 and 1968. After Rockefeller's tenure in 1973, he continued to work for the state government and ran his own management consulting firm.

In 1951, he married professional tennis player Sarah Palfrey (1912–1996). They had one son together, Jerome Palfrey Danzig; and he had a stepdaughter from Palfry's previous marriage, Diana Cooke Dupont. Danzig died on July 15, 2001, at the age of 82 at his home on the Upper East Side of Manhattan.
