= Leonard Lerman =

American scientist (1925–2012)

- Born: Leonard Solomon Lerman; June 27, 1925; Pittsburgh, Pennsylvania
- Died: September 19, 2012 (aged 87); Cambridge, Massachusetts
- Education: California Institute of Technology
- Known for: Cell cloning, human karyotype
- Scientific career
- Fields: Genetics
- Workplaces: Vanderbilt University Nashville; University of Colorado Health Sciences Center, Denver; SUNY Albany
- Thesis: Studies on the reaction of antibody with simple substances. The slow contraction of frog muscle. The hemodynamics of aortic occlusion. (1949 @)
- Doctoral advisor: Linus Pauling
- Doctoral students: Sidney Altman, Tom Maniatis

Leonard Solomon Lerman (June 27, 1925 – September 19, 2012) was an American scientist most noted for his work on DNA.

== Life and career ==
Lerman was born and raised in Pittsburgh, the son of Freamah and Meyer Lerman, Jewish immigrants from Ukraine. His father was a department store buyer. Lerman began attending the Carnegie Institute of Technology before graduating from high school and received his BS in five semesters. As a graduate student with Linus Pauling at the California Institute of Technology, Lerman discovered that antibodies have two binding sites. Later, perhaps his most important discovery was that certain molecules bind to DNA by intercalation. This discovery has shaped much of science's understanding about how drugs and mutagens interact with DNA.

Later, during a sabbatical at the University of Cambridge, Lerman had a chance to work with later Nobel prize winners Sydney Brenner and Francis Crick.

Lerman led a productive research program at Vanderbilt University in Nashville, the University of Colorado Health Sciences Center in Denver and SUNY Albany, the State University of New York at Albany. Lerman's lab crew included at least one Nobel prize winner, Sidney Altman, and another, Tom Maniatis, who also became one of the leading molecular biologists of his time.

Lerman's last major effort, begun with Stuart Fischer at SUNY, was the invention of denaturing gradient gel electrophoresis (DGGE), a technique used to separate DNA molecules. DGGE is widely used by scientists who wish to ascertain biodiversity in microbial communities.

Dr. Lerman was also a senior member of one of the first biotechnology companies, the Genetics Institute, co-founded by one of his students, Tom Maniatis. Dr. Lerman was a member of the National Academy of Sciences, USA.
