= Robert B. Darnell =

American biochemist (born 1957)

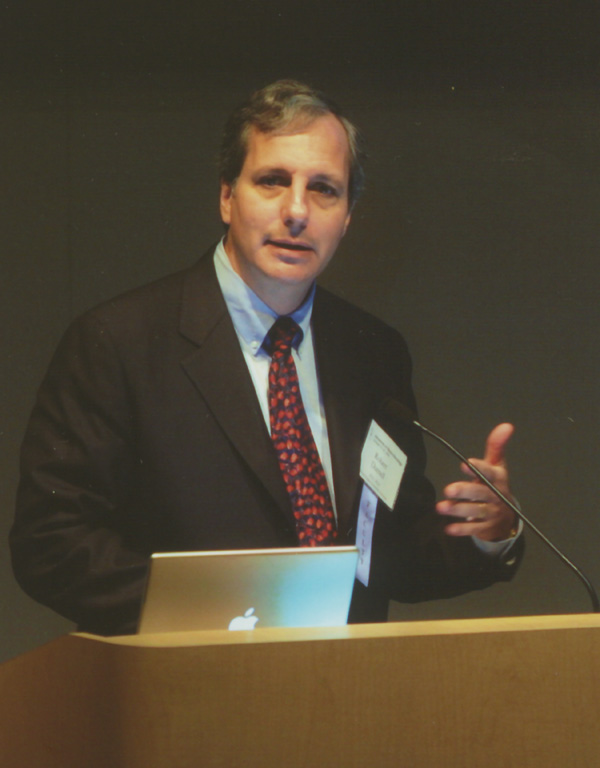
- Darnell lecturing in 2010
- Born: Robert Bernard Darnell; October 29, 1957 (age 68); Washington, D.C.
- Education: Columbia College, Columbia University, Washington University School of Medicine, Mt. Sinai School of Medicine, Weill Cornell Medical College, Memorial Sloan-Kettering Cancer Center
- Known for: Translational basic and medical research RNA regulation in the brain (2003) Publication of RNA CLIP method
- Awards: 2010 National Academy of Medicine; 2012 NIH Director's Transformative Award; 2014 National Academy of Sciences; 2015 Columbia University Medical Center & New York-Presbyterian Health Sciences Advisory Council Distinguished Service Award as Director of NY Genome Center; 2017 NINDS Research Program Award (R35)
- Scientific career
- Fields: Neurooncology; Neuroscience; Immunology
- Workplaces: Rockefeller University 1992-present Howard Hughes Medical Institute 2002-present
- Doctoral advisor: Robert G. Roeder

Robert Bernard Darnell (born October 29, 1957) is an American neurooncologist and neuroscientist, founding director and former CEO of the New York Genome Center, the Robert and Harriet Heilbrunn Professor of Cancer Biology at The Rockefeller University, and an Investigator of the Howard Hughes Medical Institute. His research into rare autoimmune brain diseases led to the invention of the HITS-CLIP method to study RNA regulation, and he is developing ways to explore the regulatory portions—known as the "dark matter"—of the human genome.

At The Rockefeller University Darnell is head of the Laboratory of Molecular Neuro-Oncology, and Senior Physician at the Rockefeller University Hospital, has been an HHMI Investigator since 1992, and an Adjunct Attending Neuro-Oncologist at the Memorial Sloan-Kettering Cancer Center. He was named to the New York Genome Center position on November 28, 2012, a position he held through 2016. His publications can be found via Google Scholar and his ORCID ID 0000-0002-5134-8088.

== Career ==
Darnell's early research was concentrated on paraneoplastic syndromes (PNDs, the paraneoplastic neurologic disorders), disorders touching on various clinical and basic aspects of biology including cancer immunology and neuroimmunology. He was the first to definitively demonstrate that naturally occurring tumor immunity in humans was caused by antigen-specific cytotoxic (CD8+) T cells, helping to generate the foundation for the field of immuno-oncology. His lab was the first to use PND patient antisera to screen expression cDNA libraries to identify the genes encoding the PND antigens. This opened the door to the cloning of the Nova, cdr2 and Elavl (Hu) antigens, and led Darnell to hypothesize, based on the intracellular nature of the antigens, that tumor immunity was mediated by CD8+ T cells. His laboratory went on to prove this hypothesis, demonstrating cdr2-specific CD8+ T cells were present in the peripheral blood and cerebrospinal fluid of patients with paraneoplastic cerebellar degeneration associated with tumor immunity to breast or ovarian cancers.

The discovery of that the Nova PND antigen (associated with paraneoplastic opsoclonus-myoclonus ataxia) was the first of a class of neuron-specific RNA-binding proteins led his laboratory to question the nature of RNA regulation in the brain and why it might be co-opted in cancer cells. His laboratory developed the HITS-CLIP technique that is used to map the sites of regulatory interactions between RNA-binding proteins and their target RNA sequences, originally using it to study the Nova proteins and subsequently a large number of other RNA binding proteins that are implicated in brain disease, including FMRP (associated with intellectual disability and autism), RbFox (associated with autism), Mbnl (associated with myotonic dystrophy), Elavl (the Hu PND antigen) and cancer (including RBM47 and Argonaute-miRNA interactions, both implicated in breast cancer).

In 2012, Darnell became the founding director and CEO of the New York Genome Center, a not-for-profit multi-institutional academic collaborative founded to harness big data, molecular genetics to improve clinical care in an ethical and equitable manner. The center opened in September 2013 with support and participation from James Watson, Harold Varmus, New York Mayor Michael Bloomberg, Marc Tessier-Lavigne and many others, growing within 2 years to bring a world-class genomic center to New York. In 2016 NYGC was one of four Genome Centers in the United States to be awarded a large grant from the NIH to use genomic sequencing to study common diseases. After securing a $100M philanthropic grant for NYGC and a seven-year Research Program Award from NINDS, Darnell returned to pursue his work on genomic medicine and neuroscience at the Rockefeller University and HHMI in 2017.

Darnell received his undergraduate degrees in biology and chemistry in 1979 from Columbia University, and his MD/PhD in Molecular Biology in 1985 from Washington University in St. Louis. He was trained in Internal Medicine at Mount Sinai School of Medicine, and in Neurology at Weill Cornell Medical Center, where he was chief resident in 1990 with Fred Plum. He has worked and published extensively with Jerome B. Posner, one of the founders of the study of PNDs, co-authoring a definitive text on the subject. In 2010 he was elected to the Institute of Medicine of the National Academy of Sciences, and a Fellow of the AAAS (the American Association for the Advancement of Science), in 2014 he was elected to the National Academy of Sciences, and in 2019 he was named a Fellow of the American Academy of Arts and Sciences.

== Personal life ==
Darnell comes from a family of scientists; he is the son of American scientist James E. Darnell, another pioneer in RNA research, the father of Alicia Darnell, an assistant professor at the Duke Cancer Institute, and second-place winner in the 2007 Siemens Competition in Math, Science & Technology, as well as the father of Andrew J. Darnell, MBA, who completed a master's in Bioethics and Science Policy at Duke and graduated from Duke Law School in 2019.

Darnell is a passionate amateur cellist; he studied with Gilda Barston, herself a student of Leonard Rose, and Ardith Alton at Juilliard. In 2000, after his mother died of breast cancer, Darnell founded the Chamber Orchestra of Science and Music at Rockefeller University in her honor, saying in an interview with the Burroughs Wellcome Fund Clinical Scientist Award for Translational Research: "I love to breathe in music and art...seeing the intensity others put into life is a source of inspiration".

Darnell is also a triathlete, completing the New York City Olympic Triathlon every year since 2012-2022, the NJ Olympic Triathon since 2023; Darnell completed the Atlantic City Ironman in 2019.

== Awards ==
- 1996 Irma T. Hirschl Trust Career Scientist Award
- 1998 American Neurological Association Derek Denny-Brown Young Neurological Scholar Award
- 2000 Burroughs Wellcome Fund Clinical Scientist Awards in Translational Research
- 2010 Fellow of the American Association for the Advancement of Science
- 2010 Member of the Institute of Medicine of the National Academy of Sciences
- 2010 Member of the Association of American Physicians
- 2012 National Institutes of Health Director's Transformative Research Award
- 2014 Member of the National Academy of Sciences
- 2015 CUMC & NYP Distinguished Service Award
- 2017 NINDS Research Program Award
- 2019 Member of the American Academy of Arts and Sciences
