= Robin Reed (biologist) =

American professor of cell biology (1956–2022)

- Born: August 1, 1956
- Died: July 23, 2022 (aged 65)
- Education: Yale University; Hiram College
- Scientific career
- Workplaces: Harvard University; Harvard Medical School
- Doctoral advisor: Sidney Altman

Robin Elizabeth Reed (August 1, 1956 – July 23, 2022) was an American professor of cell biology at the Harvard Medical School. Her research considered the molecular mechanisms that underpin neurodegenerative disease.

== Early life and education ==
Reed was born on August 1, 1956, in Akron, Ohio, to Nancy Nobel Reed and Lawrence Andrew Reed. She was an equestrian, taking part in both dressage and show jumping. Reed was an undergraduate at Hiram College in Ohio, where she majored in biology. She joined Yale University as a technician, where she took advanced science courses to prepare herself for doctoral research there. For her PhD, she worked in the laboratory of Sidney Altman and was the first to clone and sequence the gene encoding the RNA subunit of RNase P. Altman acknowledged her contributions to science in his Nobel Prize lecture.

Reed moved to Harvard University for postdoctoral research, where she started working on pre-RNA splicing with Tom Maniatis. Reed characterized the branchpoint sequence in mammalian introns. She also demonstrated that exon sequences affect the splicing site choice.

== Research and career ==
In 1989, Reed was made Assistant Professor of Molecular Physiology at the Harvard Medical School. She was promoted to Professor of Cell Biology in 1999. Reed was interested in human RNA machines, including the survival of motor neuron (SMN) complex and the TRanscription-EXport (TREX) complex. She identified the subunits of the SF3A1 and SF3B complexes.

Reed investigated the similarities between amyotrophic lateral sclerosis, frontotemporal dementia and spinal muscular atrophy. Loss of nuclear structures called "Gems" are a cellular hallmark of spinal muscular atrophy. Reed showed that patients with FUS and TDP-43 are also deficient in Gems, which prompted Reed to investigate the Gem phenotype. She argued that disruptions in RNA splicing were common to many motor neuron disorders.

Reed also studied the spliceosome, a multi-component RNA machine. The U2 spliceosomal RNA (U2 snRNA), is the target of the anti-tumor E7107, base pairs in the branchpoint sequence. She showed that E7107 causes defects in the assembly of spliceosomes and stops tight binding of U2 spliceosomal RNA. She identified that TREX was involved in packing and exporting mRNA.

== Selected publications ==
- Maniatis T; Reed R (4 April 2002). "An extensive network of coupling among gene expression machines". Nature. 416 (6880): 499–506. doi:10.1038/416499a. ISSN 1476-4687. PMID 11932736. Wikidata Q29547273.
- Lili Wang; Michael S Lawrence; Youzhong Wan; et al. (12 December 2011). "SF3B1 and other novel cancer genes in chronic lymphocytic leukemia". The New England Journal of Medicine. 365 (26): 2497–2506. doi:10.1056/nejmoa1109016. ISSN 0028-4793. PMC 3685413. PMID 22150006. Wikidata Q34093678.
- Zhaolan Zhou; Lawrence J Licklider; Steven P Gygi; Robin Reed (12 September 2002). "Comprehensive proteomic analysis of the human spliceosome". Nature. 419 (6903): 182–5. doi:10.1038/nature01031. ISSN 1476-4687. PMID 12226669. Wikidata Q28201545.

== Personal life ==
Reed was an athlete, playing tennis and golf. She died on July 23, 2022.
