= Sidney Altman =

Canadian-American molecular biologist (1939–2022)

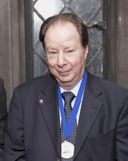
- Altman in 2011
- Born: May 7, 1939; Montreal, Quebec, Canada
- Died: April 5, 2022 (aged 82); Rockleigh, New Jersey, U.S.
- Education: Massachusetts Institute of Technology; University of Colorado Medical Center; Columbia University; Arizona State University
- Known for: Ribozymes
- Spouse: Ann Korner (m. 1972; div. 2018)
- Children: 2
- Awards: Nobel Prize in Chemistry (1989); Lomonosov Gold Medal (2016); Rosenstiel Award (1988)
- Scientific career
- Fields: Molecular biology
- Workplaces: Yale University; Cambridge University; Harvard University; MRC Laboratory of Molecular Biology
- Thesis: Bacteriophage T_{4} DNA replication in the absence and presence of 9-aminoacrine (1967)
- Doctoral advisor: Leonard Lerman
- Doctoral students: Benjamin C. Stark, Robin Reed

Sidney Altman (/ˈɔːltmən/ AWLT-mən; May 7, 1939 – April 5, 2022) was a Canadian-American molecular biologist, who was the Sterling Professor of Molecular, Cellular, and Developmental Biology and Chemistry at Yale University. In 1989, he shared the Nobel Prize in Chemistry with Thomas R. Cech for their work on the catalytic properties of RNA.

== Family and education ==
Altman was born on May 7, 1939, in Montreal, Quebec, Canada. His parents, Ray (Arlin), a textile worker, and Victor Altman, a grocer, were Jewish immigrants to Canada, each coming from Eastern Europe as a young adult, in the 1920s. Altman's mother was from Białystok in Poland, and had come to Canada with her sister at the age of eighteen, learning English and working in a textile factory to earn money to bring the rest of their family to Quebec. Altman's father, born in Ukraine, had been a worker on a collective farm in the Soviet Union. He was sponsored to come to Canada as a farm worker, but later, as a husband and a father of two sons, he supported the family by running a small grocery store in Montreal. Sidney Altman was later to look back on his parents' lives as an illustration of the value of the work ethic: "It was from them I learned that hard work in stable surroundings could yield rewards, even if only in infinitesimally small increments."

As Altman reached adulthood, the family's financial situation had become secure enough that he was able to pursue a college education. He went to the United States to study physics at the Massachusetts Institute of Technology. While at MIT, he was a member of the ice hockey team. After achieving his bachelor's degree from MIT in 1960, Altman spent 18 months as a graduate student in physics at Columbia University. Due to personal concerns and the lack of opportunity for beginning graduate students to participate in laboratory work, he left the program without completing the degree. Some months later, he enrolled as a graduate student in biophysics at the University of Colorado Medical Center. His project was a study of the effects of acridines on the replication of bacteriophage T4 DNA. He received his Ph.D. in biophysics from the University of Colorado in 1967 with thesis advisor Leonard Lerman; Lerman went in 1967 to Vanderbilt University, where Altman worked briefly as a researcher in molecular biology before leaving for Harvard.

Altman was married to Ann M. Körner (daughter of Stephan Körner) in 1972. They are the parents of two children, Daniel and Leah. Having lived primarily in the United States since departing Montreal to attend MIT in 1958, Altman became a U.S. citizen in 1984, maintaining dual citizenship as a Canadian citizen as well.

== Career ==
After receiving his Ph.D., Altman embarked upon the first of two research fellowships. He joined Matthew Meselson's laboratory at Harvard University to study a DNA endonuclease involved in the replication and recombination of T4 DNA. Later, at the MRC Laboratory of Molecular Biology in Cambridge, England, Altman started the work that led to the discovery of RNase P and the enzymatic properties of the RNA subunit of that ribozyme. John D. Smith, as well as several postdoctoral colleagues, provided Altman with very good advice that enabled him to test his ideas. "The discovery of the first radiochemically pure precursor to a tRNA molecule enabled me to get a job as an assistant professor at Yale University in 1971, a difficult time to get any job at all".

Altman's career at Yale followed a standard academic pattern with promotion through the ranks until he became Professor in 1980. He was Chairman of his department from 1983 to 1985 and in 1985 became the Dean of Yale College for four years. On July 1, 1989, he returned to the post of Professor on a full-time basis. His doctoral students include Ben Stark.

While at Yale, Altman's Nobel Prize work came with the analysis of the catalytic properties of the ribozyme RNase P, a ribonucleoprotein particle consisting of both a structural RNA molecule and one (in prokaryotes) or more (in eukaryotes) proteins. Originally, it was believed that, in the bacterial RNase P complex, the protein subunit was responsible for the catalytic activity of the complex, which is involved in the maturation of tRNAs. During experiments in which the complex was reconstituted in test tubes, Altman and his group discovered that the RNA component, in isolation, was sufficient for the observed catalytic activity of the enzyme, indicating that the RNA itself had catalytic properties, which was the discovery that earned him the Nobel Prize. Although the RNase P complex also exists in eukaryotic organisms, his later work revealed that in those organisms, the protein subunits of the complex are essential to the catalytic activity, in contrast to the bacterial RNase P.

== Recognition ==
Altman was elected a Fellow of the American Academy of Arts and Sciences in 1988 and a member of both the National Academy of Sciences and the American Philosophical Society in 1990.

== Death ==
Altman died on April 5, 2022, in Rockleigh, New Jersey, after a long illness.

== Bibliography ==
- Altman, Sidney (September 2007). "A view of RNase P.". Mol Biosyst. 3 (9): 604–7. doi:10.1039/b707850c. PMID 17700860.
- Altman, S; Baer, M F; Bartkiewicz, M; Gold, H; Guerrier-Takada, C; Kirsebom, LA; Lumelsky, N; Peck, K (October 15, 1989). "Catalysis by the RNA subunit of RNase P—a minireview". Gene. 82 (1): 63–4. doi:10.1016/0378-1119(89)90030-9. PMID 2479591.

== See also ==
- History of RNA biology
- List of RNA biologists
- List of Jewish Nobel laureates
