= NAS Prize in Food and Agriculture Sciences =

Annual prize awarded by the US National Academy of Sciences

- Awarded for: Contribution to agriculture or to the understanding of the biology of a species fundamentally important to agriculture or food production
- Sponsored by: Bill & Melinda Gates Foundation, Foundation for Food and Agriculture Research
- Country: United States
- Presented by: National Academy of Sciences
- Rewards: $100,000 and a medal
- Established: 2016
- First award: 2017
- Website: nasonline.org/award/nas-prize-in-food-and-agriculture-sciences/

The NAS Prize in Food and Agriculture Sciences is a prize awarded by the National Academy of Sciences each year to a scientist at a United States institution for contributions to agriculture, or the understanding of the biology of an agriculturally important species. The award is presented to a single individual who must have received their Ph.D. no more than 20 years prior to the year of the award. The recipient receives a $100,000 prize and a medal.

== History ==
The existence of the prize was announced in 2016 in conjunction with the World Food Prize symposium. The National Academy of Sciences had previously had no award dedicated specifically to food and agricultural sciences, though scientists in these fields were eligible for awards in broader categories. The idea for the prize emerged from a conversation between several NAS members and Bill Gates at the 2013 NAS annual meeting, shortly after Gates and his wife received the Public Welfare Medal.

The prize was designed to be comparable in prestige and value to other major awards in the field, particularly the Wolf Prize in Agriculture and the World Food Prize and was specifically intended to attract younger scientists to food and agricultural research.

The NAS Council approved the concept in February 2014, and the prize was officially established in 2016 with a $3 million endowment funded equally by the Bill & Melinda Gates Foundation and the Foundation for Food and Agriculture Research (FFAR).

== Eligibility ==
The recipient of the prize must be employed at a U.S. institution and be mid-career, which, for the purposes of the prize, is defined as no more than 20 years since completion of the recipient's Ph.D. The prize specifically lists potential areas of science recipients might contribute to as including: Plant and Animal Sciences, Microbiology, Nutrition and Food Science, Soil Science, Entomology, Veterinary Medicine and Agricultural Economics.

While the prize is typically awarded to a single individual, it may be shared by two or more individuals with approximately equal contributions to a collaborative accomplishment.

== Laureates ==
- 2026 James Schnable, University of Nebraska–Lincoln
- 2025 Hans Coetzee, Kansas State University
- 2024 Jeffrey Ross-Ibarra, University of California, Davis
- 2023 Huaijun Zhou, University of California, Davis
- 2022 David Lobell, Stanford University
- 2021 Christina M. Grozinger, Pennsylvania State University
- 2020 Zachary Lippman, Cold Spring Harbor Laboratory
- 2019 Elizabeth Ainsworth, USDA-ARS
- 2018 Rodolphe Barrangou, North Carolina State University
- 2017 Edward S. Buckler IV, USDA-ARS

== See also ==
- List of National Academy of Sciences Awards
- List of agriculture awards
