= Douglas Koshland =

American biochemist (born 1953)

Douglas Elliot Koshland
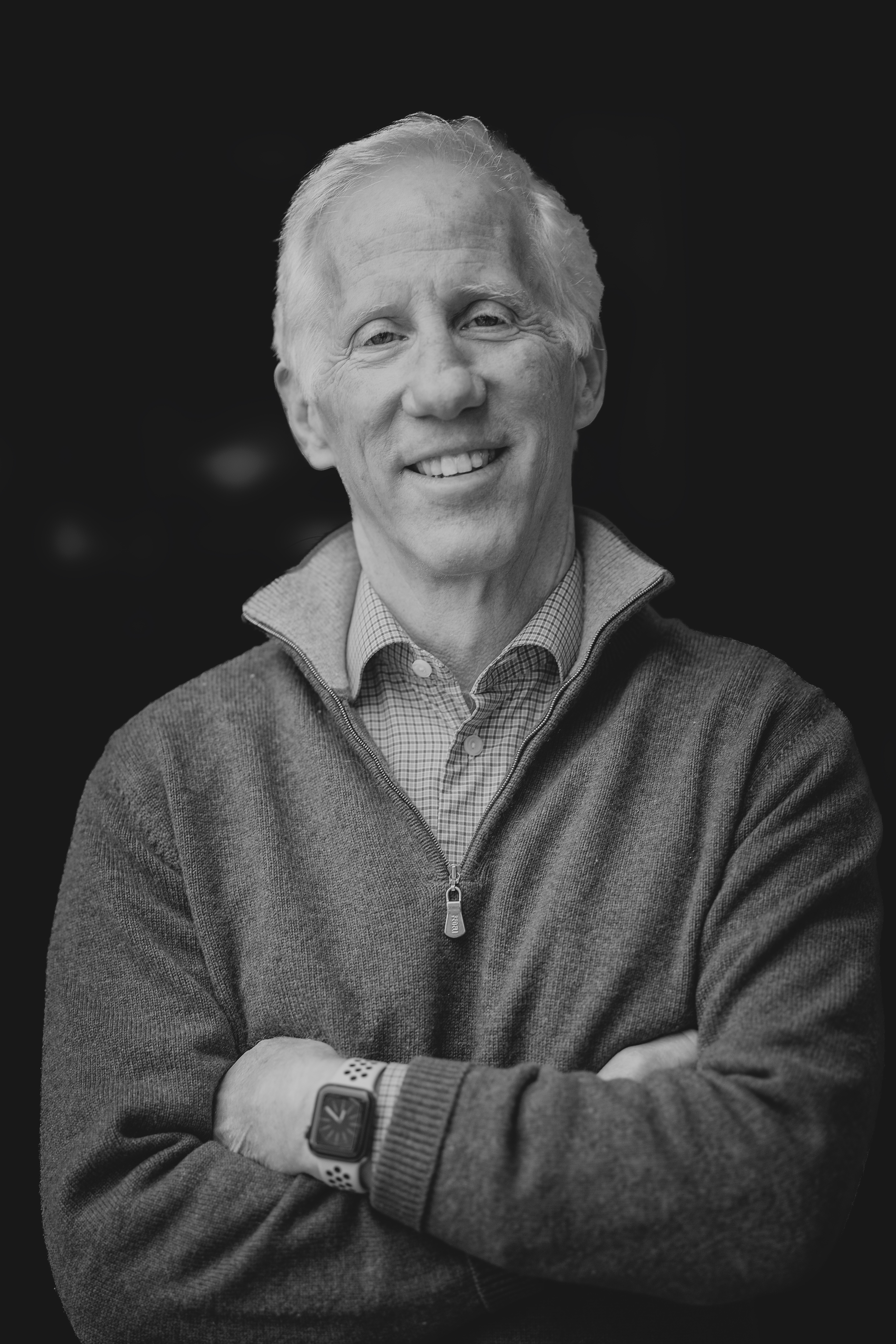
- Born: March 15, 1953 (age 73); Long Island, New York, US
- Education: Haverford College, Massachusetts Institute of Technology
- Spouse: Mary Porter
- Parent(s): Marian Koshland; Daniel E. Koshland Jr.
- Awards: Beckman Young Investigators Award; Genetics Society of America Medal (2021)
- Scientific career
- Fields: Genetics
- Workplaces: University of California, Berkeley
- Doctoral advisor: David Botstein, Marc Kirschner
- Other academic advisors: Leland Hartwell

Douglas E. Koshland (1953-present) is an American professor of molecular and cellular biology at the University of California, Berkeley.

== Biography ==
Koshland is the son of Marian (née Elliot) and Daniel E. Koshland Jr. He earned his B.A. in chemistry from Haverford College and his Ph.D. in microbiology from Massachusetts Institute of Technology under the guidance of David Botstein. He then did his postdoctoral work with Leland Hartwell at University of Washington and with Marc Kirschner at the University of California, San Francisco.

He was a staff scientist at Carnegie Institution for Science from 1987 and an adjunct professor in the Department of Biology at Johns Hopkins University. He was a Howard Hughes Medical Institute (HHMI) investigator from 1997-2012, was inducted into the National Academy of Sciences in 2010, and is a Fellow of the American Association for the Advancement of Science.

Koshland closed his laboratory in 2026 and ceased hiring students.

== Personal life ==
Koshland is married to Mary Porter.

== See also ==
Daniel E. Koshland, Jr., biochemistry professor, University of California, Berkeley
