= National Academies of Sciences, Engineering, and Medicine =

Scientific national academy for the U.S.

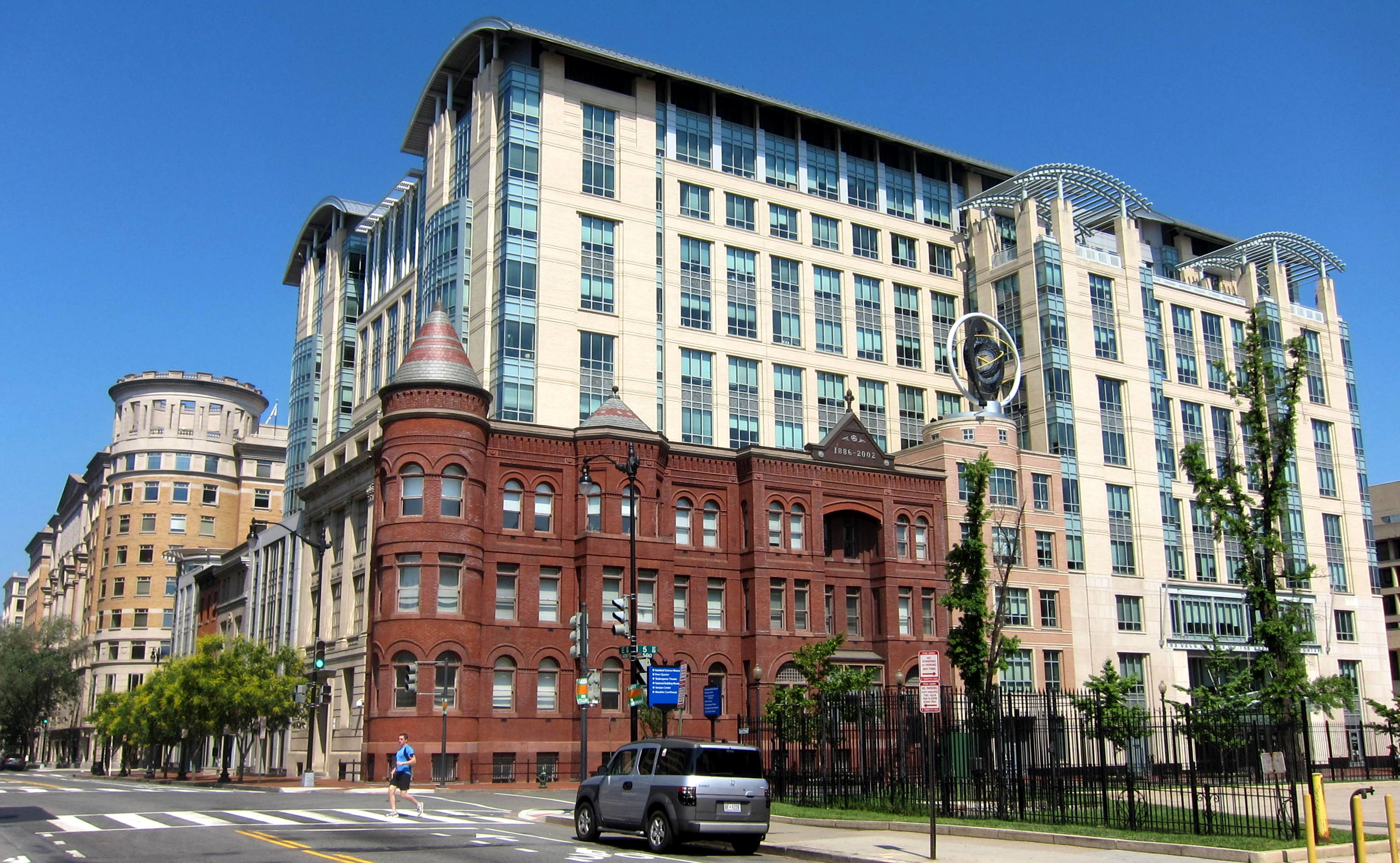
- The Keck Center of the National Academies in Washington, D.C.

- Location within Central Washington, D.C.
- Abbreviation: NASEM
- Formation: 1863 (National Academy of Sciences); 1916 (Program Centers); 1964 (National Academy of Engineering); 1970 (National Academy of Medicine)
- Founder: Federal government of the United States
- Type: National Academy
- Tax ID no.: 53-0196932
- Legal status: Congressionally Chartered Nonprofit Organization
- Headquarters: Keck Center; 500 5th Street, NW, Washington, D.C. 20001
- Location(s): National Academy of Sciences Building and 2101 Constitution Avenue NW, Washington, D.C.
- Coordinates: 38°53′48″N 77°01′10″W
- Official language: English
- President (NAS) & Chair (NRC): Neil Shubin
- President (NAE): Tsu-Jae King Liu
- President (NAM): Monica M. Bertagnolli
- Subsidiaries: National Academy of Sciences (NAS); National Academy of Engineering (NAE); National Academy of Medicine (NAM)
- Website: www.nationalacademies.org

The National Academies of Sciences, Engineering, and Medicine (NASEM), also known as the National Academies, is a congressionally chartered organization that serves as the collective scientific national academy of the United States.

NASEM is a parent organization for its three honorific learned society member organizations, the National Academy of Sciences, National Academy of Engineering, and National Academy of Medicine. It also produces studies and reports issued by its unified operating arm, previously called the National Research Council and today known as the Program Centers, serving as a public policy advisor, research institute, think tank, and public administration consultant on issues of public importance in the United States or on request by the federal, state, or local governments.

The National Research Council, National Academy of Engineering, and National Academy of Medicine began as activities of the National Academy of Sciences until they were reorganized in 2015 into units of the current National Academies while maintaining the charter status and corporate successorship of the original National Academy of Sciences. Now jointly governed by all three academies, the Program Centers produce some 200 publications annually which are published by the National Academies Press. The reports produced by the National Academies have been characterized as reflective of scientific consensus.

== History ==
=== Origins ===
The U.S. National Academy of Sciences was created by an Act of Incorporation dated March 3, 1863, which was signed by Abraham Lincoln. The Act stated that "... the Academy shall, whenever called upon by any department of the Government, investigate, examine, experiment, and report upon any subject of science or art. ... " All subsequently affiliated organizations have been created under this same overall congressional charter.

With the American civil war raging, the new academy was presented with few problems to solve, but it did address matters of "... coinage, weights and measures, iron ship hulls, and the purity of whiskey ..."

=== World War I ===
On June 19, 1916, president Woodrow Wilson requested that the National Academy of Sciences organize a "National Research Council". The purpose of the council (at first called the National Research Foundation) was in part to foster and encourage "the increased use of scientific research in the development of American industries ... the employment of scientific methods in strengthening the national defense ... and such other applications of science as will promote the national security and welfare."

At the time, the academy's effort to support national defense readiness, the Committee on Nitric Acid Supply, was approved by Secretary of War Newton D. Baker. Nitric acid was the substance basic in the making of propellants such as cordite, high explosives, dyes, fertilizers, and other products but availability was limited due to World War I. The NRC, through its committee, recommended importing Chilean saltpeter and the construction of four new ordnance plants. These recommendations were accepted by the War Department in June 1917, although the plants were not completed prior to the end of the war.

In 1918, Wilson formalized the NRC's existence under Executive Order 2859. Wilson's order declared the function of the NRC to be in general:

"(T)o stimulate research in the mathematical. physical, and biological sciences. and in the application of these sciences to engineering, agriculture. medicine. and other useful arts. with the object of increasing knowledge, of strengthening the national defense, and of contributing in other ways to the public welfare."

During World War I, when the United States was at war, the NRC operated as the Department of Science and Research of the Council of National Defense as well as the Science and Research Division of the United States Army Signal Corps. When war was first declared, the council had organized committees on anti-submarine and gas warfare.

On June 1, 1917, the council convened a meeting of scientific representatives of the UK and France with interested parties from the U.S. on the subject of submarine detection. Another meeting with the British and French was held in Paris in October 1918, at which more details of their work were disclosed. As a result of these meetings, the NRC recommended that scientists be brought together to work on the problems associated with submarine detection. Due to the success of council-directed research in producing a sound-based method of detecting submarines, as well as other military innovations, the NRC was retained at the end of the war, though it was gradually decoupled from the military.

=== Later history ===
The National Academy of Engineering was created in 1964. The Institute of Medicine was created in 1970 and renamed the National Academy of Medicine in 2015.

NRC's Articles of Organization have been changed only three times: in 1956, January 1993, and July 2015.

== Organization ==
=== Honorary academies ===
The National Academy of Sciences, National Academy of Engineering, and National Academy of Medicine are honorary membership organizations, each of which has its own governing Council, and each of which elects its own new members. The membership of the three academies totals more than 6,300 scientists, engineers, and health professionals. New members for each organization are elected annually by existing members, based on their distinguished and continuing achievements in original research. By the terms of the original 1863 Congressional charter, the three academies serve pro bono as "advisers to the nation on science, engineering, and medicine."

=== Program Centers ===
The program centers, formerly known as the National Research Council, are collectively the operating arm of the three academies for the purpose of providing objective policy advice. Although separately chartered (see above), it falls legally under the overall charter of the National Academy of Sciences, whose ultimate fiduciary body is the NAS Council. In actual practice, the NAS Council delegates governing authority to a Governing Board of the National Research Council that is chaired jointly by the presidents of the three academies, with additional members chosen by them or specified in the charters of the academies.

Under this three-academy umbrella, the program units produce reports that shape policies, inform public opinion, and advance the pursuit of science, engineering, and medicine.

There are five major program centers: Center for Advancing Science and Technology (CAST); Center for Health, People, and Places (CHPP); the Gulf Research Program; Transportation Research Board, and the Office of International Networks, Cooperation, and Security (INCS).

Center for Advancing Science and Technology (CAST)

- Computing Research, Technologies, and Systems
- Science and Engineering Education and Workforce
- Science and Technology Policy and Law
- Physical Sciences, Systems, and Infrastructure
- Aeronautics, Space, and Astronomy

Center for Health, People, and Places (CHPP)

- Biomedical and Health Sciences Program Area
- Earth Systems and Resources Program Area
- Food, Nutrition, and Agriculture Program Area
- Health Care and Public Health Program Area
- Life Sciences and Biotechnology Program Area
- Social and Economic Systems Program Area

Gulf Research Program (GRP)

- Gulf Environmental Protection and Stewardship (GEPS)
- Board on Gulf Education and Engagement (BGEE)
- Gulf Health and Resilience Board (GHRB)
- Gulf Offshore Energy Safety Board

Transportation Research Board (TRB)

- Consensus and Advisory Studies Division
- Cooperative Research Programs Division
  - Airport Cooperative Research Program (ACRP)
  - National Cooperative Highway Research Program (NCHRP)
  - Behavioral Traffic Safety Cooperative Research Program (BTSCRP)
  - National Cooperative Research and Evaluation Program (NCREP)
  - Transit Cooperative Research Program (TCRP)
  - National Cooperative Freight Research Program (NCFRP)
  - National Cooperative Rail Research Program (NCRRP)
  - Hazardous Materials Cooperative Research Program (HMCRP)

International Networks, Cooperation, and Security (INCS)

== Study process ==
The National Academies attempt to obtain authoritative, objective, and scientifically balanced answers to difficult questions of national importance. Top scientists, engineers, health professionals, and other experts (not limited to those in academies membership) are enlisted to address the scientific and technical aspects of some of society's problems. These experts are volunteers who serve on study committees that are convened to answer specific sets of questions. All committee members serve without pay.

NASEM does not perform original research; rather it provides independent advice. Federal agencies are the primary financial sponsors of the Academies' work; additional studies are funded by state agencies, foundations, other private sponsors, and the National Academies endowment. The external sponsors have no control over the conduct or results of a study, once the statement of task and budget are finalized. Study committees gather information from many sources in public meetings but deliberate in private in order to avoid political, special interest, and sponsor influence.

All reports go through an extensive external review facilitated by the internal Report Review Committee (also consisting of members from the NAS, NAE, and NAM).

Through this study process, the National Academies produce around 200 reports each year. Recent reports addressed the obesity epidemic, the use of forensics in the courtroom, invasive plants, pollinator collapse, underage drinking, the Hubble Space Telescope, vaccine safety, the hydrogen economy, transportation safety, climate change, and homeland security. Many reports influence policy decisions; some are instrumental in enabling new research programs; others provide independent program reviews. The National Academies Press is the publisher for the National Academies of Sciences, Engineering, and Medicine, and makes its publications available for free online reading. The full book PDFs have been available for free download since 2011.

The National Academies also provide credentialed witnesses who speak before government bodies on important issues. For example, a committee chair may speak on rising mortality rates in working adults in the US to a Senate Subcommittee on Primary Health and Retirement Security, Committee on Health, Education, Labor and Pensions.

=== Reports ===
==== Alcohol and health ====
In 2025, the National Academies issued their consensus study report Review of Evidence on Alcohol and Health to inform the 2025–2030 Dietary Guidelines for Americans. The committee conducted systematic reviews of scientific literature published to evaluate the relationship between alcohol consumption, including moderate alcohol consumption (defined as one drink per day for women and two for men), and eight specific health outcomes. To attempt to ensure the accuracy of these reviews, the report specifically attempted to account for "abstainer" and "sick quitter" biases by excluding studies that grouped former drinkers who may have quit due to health issues with lifelong non-drinkers.

The committee's findings varied in certainty across different health categories. It concluded with moderate certainty that moderate alcohol consumption is associated with lower all-cause mortality and a lower risk of cardiovascular mortality compared to never consuming alcohol. Conversely, the report found with moderate certainty that moderate intake is associated with an increased risk of breast cancer in females. For other conditions, such as colorectal cancer and nonfatal heart attacks, the evidence reached only a "low" level of certainty. In several areas, including neurocognition and weight change, the committee determined that no definitive conclusions could be drawn due to inconsistent data and the lack of standardized reporting in alcohol research.

==== Climate change ====
In 2001, the NRC published the report Climate Change Science: An Analysis of Some Key Questions, which emphasized that national policy decisions made both in the near term and in the future will influence the extent of any damage suffered by vulnerable human populations and ecosystems later in this century. The report endorsed findings of the Intergovernmental Panel on Climate Change (IPCC) as representing the views of the scientific community:

The changes observed over the last several decades are likely mostly due to human activities, but we cannot rule out that some significant part of these changes is also a reflection of natural variability. Human-induced warming and associated sea level rise are expected to continue through the 21st century ... The IPCC's conclusion that most of the observed warming of the last 50 years is likely to have been due to the increase in greenhouse gas concentrations accurately reflects the current[2001] thinking of the scientific community on this issue.

In 2013, the NRC published the report Abrupt Impacts of Climate Change: Anticipating Surprises, which provided an updated look at the issue of abrupt climate change and its potential impacts. This study differed from previous treatments of abrupt changes by focusing on abrupt climate changes and also abrupt climate impacts that have the potential to severely affect the physical climate system, natural systems, or human systems, often affecting multiple interconnected areas of concern.

==== Sexual assault ====
In 2013, the NRC published the report Estimating the Incidence of Rape and Sexual Assault, which pointed out that approximately 80 percent of sexual assaults go unreported to law enforcement. The report recommends that the National Crime Victimization Survey adopt new approaches to interviews of rape victims, including changing the wording of questions.

In an article about the report, Amber Stevenson, clinical supervisor and therapist at the Nashville Sexual Assault Center, said that victim-blaming was the main issue preventing victims from coming forward:

As long as we as a community continue to make victim-blaming statements, such as, "She put herself in this situation,"..."She didn't fight back, she must have wanted it," we will continue to see rapes go unreported ... We have to stop blaming the victim. The conversation needs to shift to the person who chose to rape.

==== Integrity in research ====
The 1992 report, Responsible Science: Ensuring the Integrity of the Research Process was updated in 2017 by the report, Fostering Integrity in Research:

... as experience has accumulated with various forms of research misconduct, detrimental research practices, and other forms of misconduct, as subsequent empirical research has revealed more about the nature of scientific misconduct, and because technological and social changes have altered the environment in which science is conducted, it is clear that the framework established more than two decades ago needs to be updated.

One of the report's main concerns is that a growing percentage of recently published research turns out to be not reproducible due in part to inadequate support of standards of transparency in many fields as well as to various other detrimental research practices.

== Other programs ==
The Christine Mirzayan Science and Technology Policy Fellowship is an annual program for recent graduate students to spend three months working in the National Academies. The Academies also administered the Marian Koshland Science Museum in downtown Washington until its closing in 2017; the Museum has since been replaced by LabX, a program of online resources and nationwide public events that aim to increase awareness of scientific and evidence-based solutions to community problems.

== Revenue ==
The National Academies do not receive direct appropriations from the federal government; instead their revenue comes from grants and contracts of federal agencies and private sources. According to the New York Times in 2023, "about 70 percent of the National Academies budget comes from federal funds, it also raised private donations from individuals, nonprofits and companies, including Chevron, Google, Merck, and Medtronic." At the time it was advising the government on opioid policy, it received $19 million from Purdue Pharma's Sackler family between 2000 and 2021.

Revenue applied to 2018
Source	US dollars
US government agencies (grants and contracts)
Department of Transportation (DOT)	81,078,845
Department of Defense (DOD)	33,763,256
Department of Health and Human Services (HHS)	18,383,255
U.S. Agency for International Development (USAID)	15,719,370
National Science Foundation (NSF)	12,606,945
Department of Energy (DOE)	7,940,633
National Aeronautics and Space Administration (NASA)	7,327,733
Department of Commerce (DOC)	6,363,193
Office of the Director of National Intelligence (ODNI)	5,479,264
Department of Veterans Affairs (VA)	4,204,101
Others	15,149,182
Total US government agencies	208,015,777
Private and nonfederal sources
Grants and contracts	50,193,687
Other contributions	5,669,979
Total private and nonfederal sources	55,863,666
Grand total	263,879,443

== See also ==
- American Academy of Arts and Sciences
- List of members of the National Academy of Sciences
- Member of the National Academy of Sciences
- National Academies Press
- National Academies Communication Award
- United States National Research Council rankings
