= Daniel E. Koshland Jr. =

American biochemist (1920–2007)

- Koshland in 1991
- Born: March 30, 1920; New York City, US
- Died: July 23, 2007 (aged 87); Lafayette, California, US
- Education: University of California, Berkeley (B.S.); University of Chicago (Ph.D.)
- Known for: Induced fit model
- Spouses: Marian Elliot Koshland (until her death); Yvonne Cyr San Jule
- Children: 5, including Douglas Koshland
- Awards: National Medal of Science (1990); Albert Lasker Special Achievement Award (1998)
- Scientific career
- Fields: Biochemistry
- Workplaces: University of California, Berkeley

Daniel Edward Koshland Jr. (March 30, 1920 – July 23, 2007) was an American biochemist. He reorganized the study of biology at the University of California, Berkeley, and was the editor of the leading U.S. science journal, Science, from 1985 to 1995. He was a member of the United States National Academy of Sciences, the American Academy of Arts and Sciences, and the American Philosophical Society.

== Early life ==
Koshland was born to a Jewish family, the son of Daniel E. Koshland Sr. and Eleanor (née Haas), daughter of the Haas family patriarch Abraham Haas. His great-grandfather was wool merchant Simon Koshland. He had two siblings: Frances "Sissy" Koshland Geballe and Phyllis Koshland Friedman. His father served as C.E.O. of Levi Strauss & Co. from 1955 to 1958 and is widely credited with saving the company during the Great Depression.

In 1997, Koshland's private fortune, derived from Levi Strauss, put him at 64th on the list of America's wealthiest people. Rather than relying on his fortune, Koshland chose to pursue a career in science. Koshland wrote in an autobiographical article that he decided to become a scientist in the eighth grade after reading two popular books about science, Microbe Hunters by Paul de Kruif and Arrowsmith by Sinclair Lewis.

== Research career ==
Attending Phillips Exeter Academy for high school Koshland then became the third generation of his family to matriculate to the University of California, Berkeley, where he majored in chemistry. The next five years, 1941–1946, were spent working with Glenn T. Seaborg at the University of Chicago on the top-secret Manhattan Project, where his team purified the plutonium that was used to make the atomic bomb at Los Alamos.

In 1949, he received his Ph.D. in organic chemistry from the University of Chicago. His early work was in enzyme kinetics at Brookhaven National Laboratory, Long Island, and Rockefeller University, New York. This led him to propose the induced fit model for enzyme catalysis. In the same period he studied the effect of using chemical modification to change the serine residue in the active site of subtilisin to cysteine, (in parallel with a similar experiment done independently and almost simultaneously. This can be regarded as the first example of an artificial enzyme, though Neet and Koshland did not use that term. A little later Koshland and colleagues introduced the principal alternative to the model of Monod, Wyman and Changeux to explain protein cooperativity.

Later Koshland turned to studying how bacteria control their movements in chemotaxis. His laboratory made three major discoveries concerning protein phosphorylation in bacteria:

1. The first phosphorylated bacterial protein, isocitrate dehydrogenase, was identified.
2. It was demonstrated that substituting an aspartate residue for the serine residue that was phosphorylated causes the protein to behave as if it were phosphorylated.
3. The response regulators in the two-component regulatory systems were shown to be phosphorylated on an aspartate residue and to be protein phosphatases with a covalent intermediate.

He spearheaded the reorganization of the biological sciences at Berkeley, merging eleven departments into three. In 1992, Koshland Hall was named after him. The building is located next to (and on some floors connected to) Barker Hall. Koshland Hall houses a number of laboratories in both molecular and cell biology as well as plant and microbial biology.

Koshland served as editor of the journal Science from 1985 to 1995. His philosophical essay The Seven Pillars of Life is frequently cited and discussed in terms of extraterrestrial and artificial life as well as biological life.

In 1998, Koshland was awarded the Albert Lasker Special Achievement Award given by the Lasker Foundation for medical research in the United States. In 2008, the award was renamed the Lasker-Koshland Special Achievement Award in Medical Science in honor of Koshland.

== Personal life ==
He was married to Marian Koshland (née Elliot), a fellow Berkeley professor, from 1946 until her death in 1997. Marian was not Jewish, the daughter of a teacher who had immigrated from Denmark and a hardware salesman father of Southern Baptist background. Daniel and Marian had five children: Ellen Koshland, Phyllis "Phylp" Koshland, James Koshland, Gail Koshland, and Douglas Koshland. Koshland's son Douglas is a professor of genetics at the University of California, Berkeley. Daniel Koshland supported the creation of the Marian Koshland Science Museum by giving a major gift to the National Academy of Sciences in Marian's honor.

After his wife's death in 1997 he reconnected with onetime Berkeley classmate Yvonne Cyr San Jule and they were married in Lafayette on August 17, 2000. San Jule had four children from previous marriages: conductor Christopher Keene, Philip Keene, Elodie Keene, and Tamsen (née San Jule) Calhoon. A biographical memoir on Koshland by David Sanders has been published by the United States National Academy of Sciences.

Koshland died in Walnut Creek, California, in 2007, after having experienced a massive stroke.
