= Mark Ptashne =

American molecular biologist

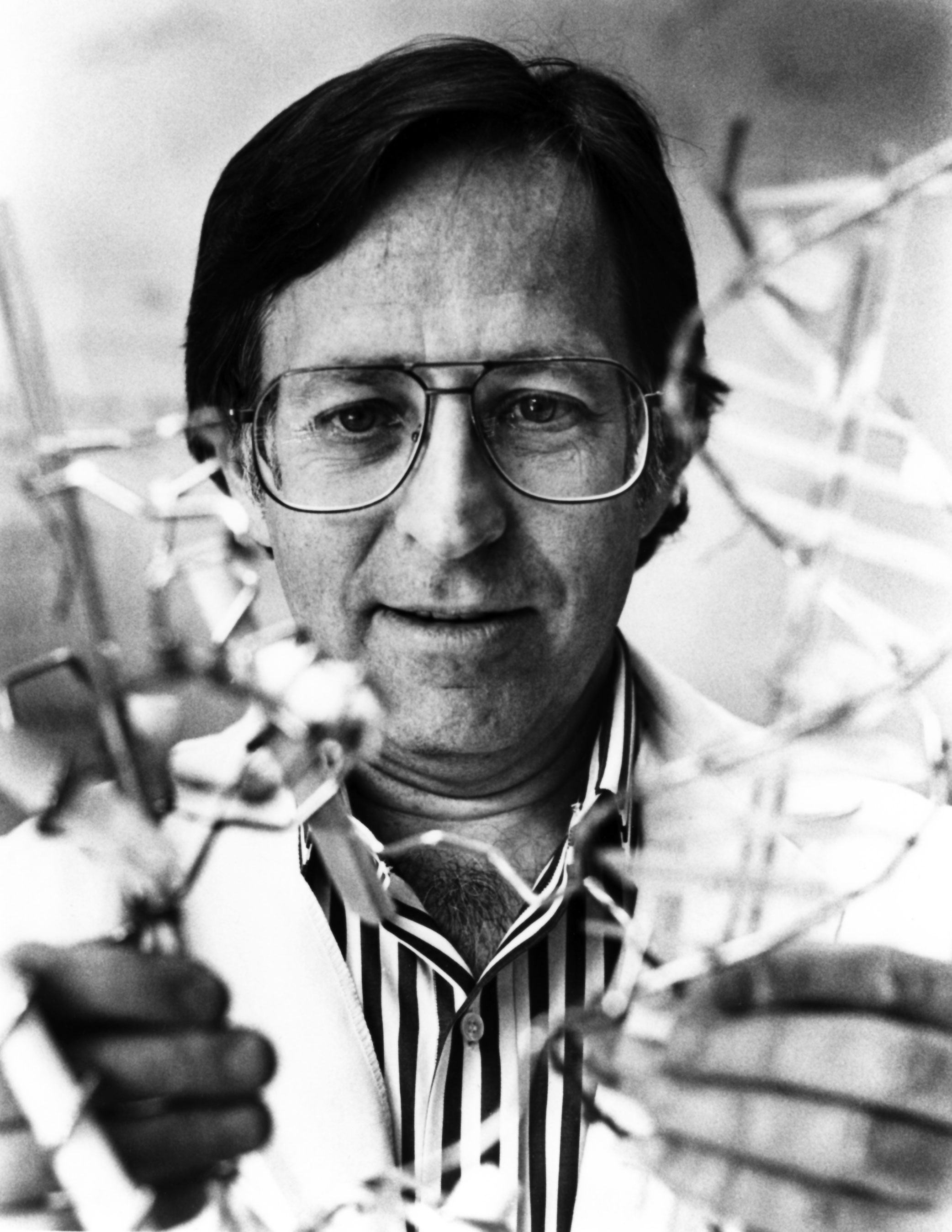
- Born: June 5, 1940 (age 86); Chicago
- Education: Reed College; Harvard University
- Awards: NAS Award in Molecular Biology (1979); Louisa Gross Horwitz Prize (1985); Lasker Award (1997); Massry Prize (1998)
- Scientific career
- Fields: Molecular Biology
- Workplaces: Memorial Sloan–Kettering Cancer Center

Mark Ptashne (born June 5, 1940, in Chicago) is a molecular biologist. He is the Ludwig Chair of Molecular Biology at Memorial Sloan–Kettering Cancer Center in New York City.

Ptashne grew up in Chicago. He earned his undergraduate degree at Reed College in Portland, Oregon in 1961 and his PhD from Harvard in 1968, after which he joined the faculty of Harvard. He was made professor there in 1971 and became chair of the Department of Biochemistry and Molecular Biology in 1980. In 1993 he was awarded an endowed chair, and in 1997 he left Harvard for MSK.

The focus of his scientific career has been gene regulation.

Ptashne was the first scientist to demonstrate specific binding between protein and DNA, and his lifelong work has been the elucidation of the molecular mechanisms of switch between lytic and lysogenic lifecyle of bacteriophage lambda, as well as how the yeast transcriptional activator Gal4 works. He was the originator of the "ball and stick" model of transcription factor function, demonstrating in bacteria and in yeast that they typically consist of separable regions that mediate DNA binding and interaction with transcriptional activators or repressors.

In 1980 he cofounded Genetics Institute, Inc. with Thomas Maniatis. The founding of a company by a Harvard scientist was something new at the time, and was very controversial.

In 1985, he was awarded the Louisa Gross Horwitz Prize from Columbia University. He won the Albert Lasker Award for Basic Medical Research in 1997, and the Massry Prize from the Keck School of Medicine, University of Southern California in 1998. He has written popular books for a wider scientific audience, including his book Genes and Signals.

Selected works
Books

- Ptashne, M; Gann, A (2002). Genes and Signals. Cold Harbor Spring Laboratory Press. ISBN 978-0-87969-633-7.
- Ptashne, M (2004). A Genetic Switch: Phage Lambda Revisited (3rd ed.). Cold Harbor Spring Laboratory Press. ISBN 978-0-87969-716-7.

Papers

- Ptashne, M (1967). "Specific Binding of the λ Phage Repressor to λ DNA". Nature. 214 (5085): 232–234. Bibcode:1967Natur.214..232P. doi:10.1038/214232a0. PMID 6034235. S2CID 4209094.
- Ptashne, M; et al. (1980). "How the λ repressor and cro work". Cell. 19 (1): 1–11. doi:10.1016/0092-8674(80)90383-9. PMID 6444544. S2CID 54281357.
- Ptashne, M. (2011). "Horace Judson (1931–2011)". PLOS Biology. 9 (7) e1001104. doi:10.1371/journal.pbio.1001104. PMC 3134443.
