= LabX =

Marian Koshland Science Museum
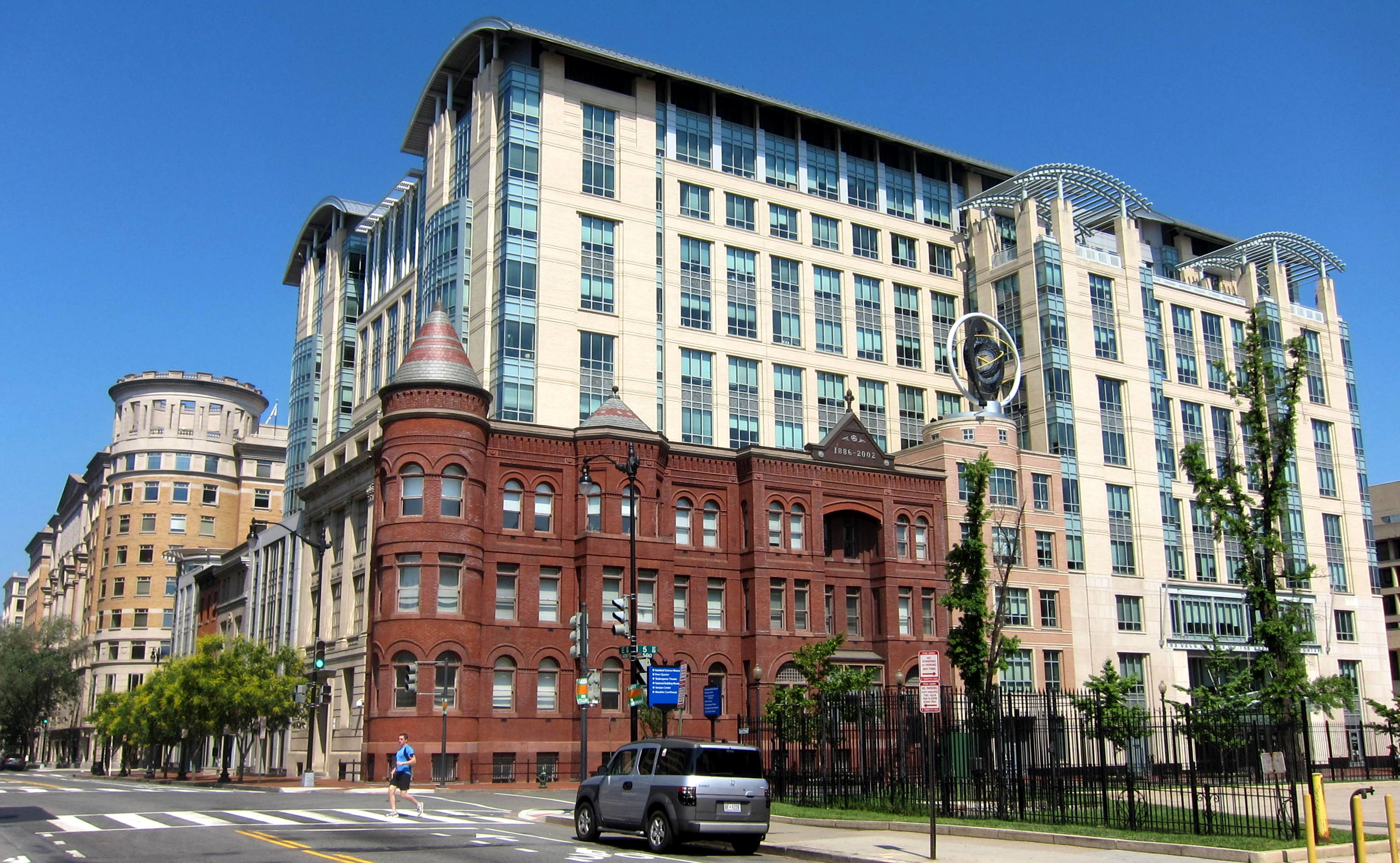
- The Marian Koshland Science Museum was housed in the Keck Center of the National Academies.

- Location within Washington, D.C.
- Established: 2004
- Dissolved: November 27, 2017
- Location: 525 E Street NW Washington, DC
- Coordinates: 38.8964°N 77.0195°W
- Type: Science museum
- Public transit access: Judiciary Square; Gallery Place-Chinatown; Archives
- Website: labx.org

LabX is the public engagement testbed at the U.S. National Academy of Sciences (NAS) - currently located in Washington, D.C. From 2004 until 2017, it was known as the Marian Koshland Science Museum. The museum featured exhibits that presented modern science and scientific issues in an accessible way, geared for the general public. It explored current scientific issues that were important for the nation's and world's public policy decisions, as presented in reports by the United States National Academies. The National Academy of Sciences replaced the museum with LabX.

== Exhibit development ==
The Koshland Science Museum was part of the National Academy of Sciences. Exhibits were developed based on guidance from committees of scientific experts, who donated their time and expertise to the museum. Each exhibit had its own Scientific Steering Committee or group of subject-matter experts who oversaw exhibit content and review information. A core group of museum staff members facilitated all aspects of exhibit selection, including development and fabrication. The museum also received input from advisory groups, whether in-person, in the community, or online. The museum also had a Museum Advisory Board involved in strategic planning.

The museum was centered around two primary exhibits: "Earth Lab", which focused on issues related to climate change, and "Life Lab", which emphasized learning, aging, nutrition, and infectious disease. The museum also had a "Wonders of Science" section devoted to interactive exhibits.

== Origin of the museum ==
Opened in April 2004, the Marian Koshland Science Museum was named for Marian Koshland, an immunologist and molecular biologist who conducted groundbreaking research in the behavior of antibodies. The museum was developed as the result of a gift from her husband, Daniel Koshland, a molecular biologist specializing in the study of enzymes and bacteria. The Museum shared an eponym with the Marian Koshland Integrated Natural Science Center at the Haverford College.

== Location ==
The museum was located at 525 E Street, NW. The museum entrance was at the corner of 6th & E Streets, NW, in the Penn Quarter neighborhood of Washington, DC. It was three blocks north of the National Mall.
