= Lasker–Koshland Special Achievement Award in Medical Science =

American award for medical research accomplishments

The Albert Lasker Special Achievement Award is one of the four Lasker Awards given by the Lasker Foundation for medical research in the United States. The first award was given in 1994; it is not awarded every year. In 2008, the award was renamed the Lasker–Koshland Special Achievement Award in Medical Science in honor of Daniel E. Koshland Jr.

== Recipients ==
Source: The Lasker Foundation - Awards

- 1994: Maclyn McCarty
- 1996: Paul Zamecnik
- 1997: Victor A. McKusick
- 1998: Daniel E. Koshland Jr.
- 1999: Seymour S. Kety
- 2000: Sydney Brenner
- 2002: James E. Darnell
- 2004: Matthew Meselson
- 2006: Joseph G. Gall
- 2008: Stanley Falkow
- 2010: David Weatherall
- 2012: Donald D. Brown and Tom Maniatis
- 2014: Mary-Claire King
- 2016: Bruce M. Alberts
- 2018: Joan Argetsinger Steitz
- 2021: David Baltimore
- 2023: Piet Borst
- 2025: Lucy Shapiro

== See also ==
- List of medicine awards
