= New York Genome Center =

Research organization in New York, United States

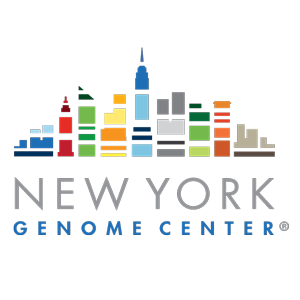
- Established: 2011
- Research type: Basic (non-clinical), Clinical research and translational research
- Field of research: Genomics, Bioinformatics, DNA sequencing, Whole genome sequencing
- Director: Tom Maniatis, PhD, Evnin Family Scientific Director & CEO
- Location: New York City, New York, United States
- Affiliations: American Museum of Natural History; Cold Spring Harbor Laboratory; Columbia University; Albert Einstein College of Medicine; Georgetown Lombardi Comprehensive Cancer Center; Hackensack Meridian Health; Hospital for Special Surgery; Memorial Sloan Kettering Cancer Center; Icahn School of Medicine at Mount Sinai; NewYork-Presbyterian Hospital; New York Stem Cell Foundation; New York University; Northwell Health; Princeton University; The Rockefeller University; Roswell Park Comprehensive Cancer Center; Rutgers Cancer Institute of New Jersey; Stony Brook; Weill Cornell Medicine
- Nobel laureates: Harold E. Varmus, MD
- Website: New York Genome Center

The New York Genome Center (NYGC) is an independent 501(c)(3) nonprofit academic research institution in New York City. It serves as a multi-institutional collaborative hub focused on the advancement of genomic science and its application to drive novel biomedical discoveries. NYGC's areas of focus include the development of computational and experimental genomic methods and disease-focused research to better understand the genetic basis of cancer, neurodegenerative disease, and neuropsychiatric disease. In 2020, NYGC also has directed its expertise to COVID-19 genomics research.

== Purpose and organization ==
The Center leverages strengths in whole genome sequencing, genomic analysis, and development of genomic tools to advance genomic discovery. Its faculty hold joint tenure-track appointments at its member institutions and lead independent research labs at the center.

NYGC's scientists bring a multidisciplinary and in-depth approach to the field of genomics, conducting research in single cell genomics, gene engineering, population and evolutionary genomics, technology and methods development, statistics, computational biology and bioengineering. In 2017, co-founder Tom Maniatis was named Evnin Family Scientific Director and chief executive officer of the New York Genome Center.

== Founding ==
The center was founded in November 2011 as a collaboration among eleven academic institutions to advance genome research, based on the vision of Dietrich A. Stephan and leadership from Tom Maniatis and financial support of $2.5 million from each institution as well as from visionary private philanthropists. In November 2012, the center recruited Robert B. Darnell as president and Scientific Director, where he served as CEO and Founding Director, before returning to Rockefeller University and Howard Hughes Medical Institute Investigator in 2017. NYGC formally opened in a multi-story building at 101 Avenue of the Americas. on September 19–20, 2013.

The 12 founding institutions (Albert Einstein College of Medicine joined the original 11 institutions in April 2013) were:

- Cold Spring Harbor Laboratory (New York)
- Columbia University (New York)
- Weill Cornell Medicine (New York)
- Memorial Sloan Kettering Cancer Center (New York)
- Icahn School of Medicine at Mount Sinai (New York)
- New York—Presbyterian Hospital (New York)
- New York University (New York)
- Northwell Health (New York)
- The Jackson Laboratory (Maine)
- Rockefeller University (New York)
- Stony Brook University (New York)
- Albert Einstein College of Medicine (New York)

Currently, NYGC has 20 member institutions with Hackensack Meridian Health and Georgetown Lombardi Comprehensive Cancer Center joining in December 2019 as associate members. and Rutgers Cancer Institute of New Jersey joining as associate member in 2020.

== Funding ==
The New York Genome Center is a 501(c)(3) nonprofit academic research institution in New York City. Since its inception, the center has raised over $500 million to support its genomic research, including federal and private grants and philanthropy. This includes two joint gifts from the Simons Foundation and the Carson Family Charitable Trust; $100 million in 2016 and $125 million in 2019.

The New York Genome Center also receives support from its member institutions, as well as New York State, the Empire State Development Corporation, the Partnership Fund for New York City, and the New York City Economic Development Corporation.

Government funding has included a $55 million grant from New York State to support genomic medicine. In 2016 it received a $40 million grant from the National Human Genome Research Institute to establish a Center for Common Disease Genomics, and is leading a collaborative, large-scale genomic sequencing program focused on advancing understanding of common diseases, including autism. Additionally, the Center and Weill Cornell Medicine received a National Cancer Institute grant to support a joint cancer genomics data center for the research and clinical interpretation of tumors, a part of the ongoing development of The Cancer Genome Atlas. The center was also awarded a $13.5 million contract in 2015 to conduct whole genome sequencing and analysis for the National Heart, Lung, and Blood Institute's TOPMed program. (Note: NYGC is among several recipients, another being the Broad Institute.)

In 2017, New York State committed $17 million in capital improvements for the New York Genome Center to house JLABS@NYC, a life sciences incubator, which opened in summer 2018.

== Notable faculty ==
- Harold E. Varmus, MD | Senior Associate Core Member
- Michael Wigler, PhD | Senior Associate Core Member
- Simon Tavaré, PhD | Senior Associate Core Member

== Recent Publications ==
In the last five years, NYGC scientists have published over 200 papers in leading scientific journals. For an up-to-date listing of publications, go to https://www.nygenome.org/lab-groups-overview/publications/
