= Tom Maniatis =

American biologist

- Born: May 8, 1943 (age 83); Denver, Colorado
- Education: University of Colorado, Vanderbilt University
- Known for: The development and application of gene cloning methods to the study of molecular biology.
- Awards: The Eli Lilly Research Award in Microbiology and Immunology, 1981; Richard Lounsbery Award, 1985; Pasarow Award in Cancer Research, 2001; Lasker-Koshland Special Achievement Award in Medical Science, 2012
- Scientific career
- Fields: Molecular Biology
- Workplaces: Harvard University, Cold Spring Harbor Laboratory, California Institute of Technology, Columbia University
- Doctoral advisor: Leonard Lerman
- Other academic advisors: Mark Ptashne, Fred Sanger

Tom Maniatis (born May 8, 1943), is an American professor of molecular and cellular biology. He is a professor at Columbia University, and served as the Scientific Director and CEO of the New York Genome Center.

== Education ==
Maniatis received B.A. and M.S. degrees from the University of Colorado in Boulder, and a PhD in Molecular Biology from Vanderbilt University. He carried out postdoctoral studies at Harvard University and at the Medical Research Council (MRC) Laboratory of Molecular Biology in Cambridge, England.

== Research and career ==
Maniatis developed and disseminated gene cloning technologies and their applications in the study of gene regulatory mechanisms.

=== cDNA Cloning ===
While an assistant professor of Biochemistry and Molecular Biology at Harvard, and a member of the Cold Spring Harbor Laboratory (CSHL) faculty, Maniatis collaborated with Drs. Fotis Kafatos and Argiris Efstratiadis to develop a method for synthesizing and cloning full length double stranded DNA copies of messenger RNA (termed “copy” or cDNA). This method provided a key step in the isolation of human genes, and in the production of “recombinant” proteins in mammalian cells in culture, a central process in the biotechnology industry.

=== Genomic DNA libraries ===
Maniatis joined the Department of Biology at the California Institute of Technology in Pasadena California, where his laboratory developed methods to isolate and study individual human genes. This lab generated the first human genomic DNA library containing all of the genes in the human genome.

Using genomic DNA library, the Maniatis lab isolated and characterized the entire “cluster” of human b-globin genes, which were the first human genes to be cloned and their DNA sequences determined. His laboratory contributed fundamental insights into the mechanisms of RNA transcription, RNA splicing and the regulation of gene expression.

Maniatis returned to Harvard in 1980 where he taught and continued his research. In 2010 he moved to Columbia University. While there he cofounded the New York Genome Center in 2010. He became the Scientific Director and CEO of the center in 2016.

=== Molecular cloning manual ===
Maniatis was instrumental in the writing of the “Molecular Cloning Manual”. In 1979, the Maniatis lab had developed and deployed gene cloning methods. Maniatis and Ed Fritsch taught a summer course in gene cloning at the Cold Spring Harbor Laboratory. Based on research methods developed in the Maniatis Laboratory and the material presented in the course, they collaborated with Joseph Sambrook, then the Scientific Director of the CSHL, to write the textbook.

=== Biotechnology companies ===
Maniatis and Mark Ptashne founded Genetics Institute, Inc. in 1980. The company produced several FDA approved drugs “protein biologics” including blood clotting factors for the treatment of hemophilia, and erythropoietin for the treatment of anemia. The company was acquired by Wyeth Pharmaceuticals.

In 1994, Maniatis, Alfred Goldberg, and others from the Harvard Medical School founded ProScript. The company invented the proteasome inhibitor Velcade (Bortezomid) approved by the FDA for the treatment of Multiple Myeloma. ProScript was acquired by Millennium/Takeda Pharma.

In 2004 Maniatis cofounded Acceleron Pharma, a TGF-b company that produced “ligand trap” drugs, including REBLOZYL^{®} for the treatment of Myodysplastic Syndrome (MDS) and b-thalassaemia.

Kallyope was founded by Maniatis, Charles Zuker, and Richard Axel in 2006. It focused on the development of drugs to treat metabolic and inflammatory disorders of the gut.

Maniatis, David Goeddel, and William J. Rutter won the Brandeis University Jacob and Louise Gabbay Award in Biotechnology and Medicine in 1999.

== Service ==
Maniatis has served on the board of trustees of the Cold Spring Harbor Laboratory, the Jackson Laboratory, and the Rockefeller University.

Maniatis led the ALS Association's initiative TREAT ALS (Translational Research Advancing Therapy for ALS) that combines drug discovery with priorities set for existing drug candidates, to accelerate clinical testing of compounds with promise for treating the disease. He also served on the scientific advisory board of “Prize for Life” founded by Avichai Kremer. Maniatis’ won the Jacob F. Javits Lifetime Achievement Award in ALS research from the ALS Association.

Maniatis was a cofounder of the New York Genome Center, headed its scientific steering committee, and has served as a member of its board of directors from its founding in 2011.

Maniatis is founding director of the university-wide Columbia University Precision Medicine Initiative (CPMI), which is dedicated to the application of genomic technology to the advancement of basic and medical science, directed towards the practice of precision medicine (the use of genetic and genomic information to diagnose and treat human diseases).

== Awards ==
- Rita Allen Foundation Career Development Award, 1978.
- The Eli Lilly Research Award in Microbiology and Immunology from the American Society of Microbiology, 1981.
- The Richard Lounsbery Award for Biology presented jointly by the French and U.S. National Academies of Sciences, 1985.
- The American Medical Association Scientific Achievement Award, 2000.
- The Pasarow Award in Cancer Research, 2001.
- The Lasker-Koshland Special Achievement Award in Medical Science, 2012.

Maniatis has received Honorary PhD degrees from the University of Athens, the Cold Spring Harbor Graduate School of Biological Sciences, and the Rockefeller University.

Maniatis was elected to the U.S. National Academy of Sciences, and the American Academy of Arts and Sciences in 1985, and the U.S. National Academy of Medicine in 2012.
