= Benjamin C. Stark =

American bioengineer

- Born: November 22, 1949 (age 76); Michigan, United States
- Education: Yale University
- Awards: William J. Branstrom Freshman Prize (University of Michigan, 1968); James B. Angell Scholar (University of Michigan, 1969-71); Phi Beta Kappa (University of Michigan, 1970); Bachelor of Science Degree with high distinction and highest honors in Cellular Biology (University of Michigan, 1971); The Phi Sigma Award in Biology (University of Michigan, 1971); National Science Foundation Graduate Fellowship (1971-74); National Science Foundation Energy-related Postdoctoral Fellowship (1977-78); Lewis College (IIT) Junior Faculty Teaching Excellence Award (1988); IIT Teaching Excellence Award (1988); William C. Staszak award, Oak Park Education Foundation, Oak Park, IL (1996); Person of the Millennium, IIT Millennium Project (1999); Honor Award for University Research by the American Academy of Environmental Engineering and Scientists (AAEES, 2013 )
- Scientific career
- Fields: Biotechnology, genetic engineering
- Workplaces: Illinois Institute of Technology
- Doctoral advisor: Sidney Altman
- Website: www.iit.edu/csl/bio/faculty/stark_benjamin.shtml

Benjamin "Ben" C. Stark is an American biologist and a professor at the Illinois Institute of Technology. He grew up in a small city in mid-Michigan in the 1950s-1960s. After high school he majored in cellular biology at the University of Michigan (B.S. 1971) and later he received his master (M.Sc. 1974) and doctoral (Ph.D. 1977) degrees from Yale University with Sidney Altman. After two postdoctoral positions, he took a faculty position at Illinois Institute of Technology, where he has worked since. He has carried out research in the area of genetic engineering and RNA biology.

He was one of the co-discoverers of RNase P, a catalytic RNA, in the laboratory of Sidney Altman who shared the Nobel Prize in Chemistry with Thomas R. Cech in 1989 for their work on the catalytic properties of RNA. Another major accomplishment of Stark includes the discovery of enhancement of productivity of recombinant organisms engineered to express the Vitreoscilla hemoglobin (VHb (hemoglobin)), the first bacterial hemoglobin. He has over 80 peer-reviewed publications.

== Awards and honors ==
Stark's research has been recognized by many awards, including Honor Award for University Research by the American Academy of Environmental Engineers and Scientists (2013), Person of the Millennium (IIT Millennium Project, 1999), and the Teaching Excellence Award (Lewis College, IIT, 1988).
