= Marian Koshland =

American immunologist (1921–1997)

- Born: Marian Elliott; October 25, 1921; New Haven, Connecticut, US
- Died: October 28, 1997 (aged 76); Berkeley, California, US
- Education: Vassar College (B.S.); University of Chicago (M.S.; Ph.D.)
- Known for: Research into antibodies and immune response
- Spouse: Daniel E. Koshland Jr. (1920–2007)
- Children: 5, including Douglas Koshland
- Awards: FASEB Excellence in Science Award (1989)
- Scientific career
- Fields: Immunology, bacteriology
- Workplaces: University of California, Berkeley

Marian Elliott "Bunny" Koshland (October 25, 1921 – October 28, 1997) was an American immunologist who discovered that the differences in amino acid composition of antibodies explain the efficiency and effectiveness with which they combat a huge range of foreign invaders.

== Biography ==
Marian Elliott was born on October 25, 1921, in New Haven, Connecticut, to Margrethe Schmidt Elliott and Walter Elliott. Her mother was a teacher who had emigrated from Denmark and her father was a hardware salesman of Southern Baptist background. When she was four, her younger brother contracted typhoid fever, and she was tutored by two neighbor girls. After her brother's recovery and return from the hospital, the siblings spent a year quarantined inside to protect the immunocompromised boy. During that period, Marian's father dedicated his time to tutoring her, leading to her being advanced compared to many of her peers when she did enter school. She was something of a tomboy, befriending three Jewish boys with whom she would attend Works Progress Administration theater productions. She was the only girl in her class who dared to handle a three-foot black constrictor snake, for which she won a can of rattlesnake meat.

Marian attended Vassar College in New York and graduated in 1942 with a degree in bacteriology. She then attended the University of Chicago, where she received her M.S. in bacteriology in 1943. In Chicago, she worked on reducing the spread of respiratory diseases and was a member of a research team that developed a vaccine for cholera.

While at Chicago, she met Daniel E. Koshland Jr., a biochemist and heir to the Levi Strauss fortune. In 1945, she joined him in Oak Ridge, Tennessee and spent a year working on the Manhattan Project, researching the biological effects of radiation. The two married in 1946 and returned to Chicago, where Marian received her Ph.D. in immunology from the University of Chicago in 1949. Marian's sister-in-law later recalled that her professor did not want to give her a Ph.D. because Marian was pregnant and he thought she would waste it. In 1949, she moved with Daniel to Boston, where Marian spent two years in a postdoctoral fellowship at Harvard Medical School's Department of Bacteriology. They later both worked at the Brookhaven National Laboratory for 13 years.

In the early 1950s, Marian Koshland demonstrated the molecular differences between serum-borne and secreted antibodies. By the 1960s, she had turned her attention to the origins of antibody specificity. Jim Allison, a colleague from Berkeley, said "Bunny analyzed polyclonal antibodies directed against two different haptens, and on the basis of exquisitely careful amino acid composition analyses, convincingly showed that these antibodies had different amino acid compositions and therefore must differ in their amino acid sequence. These data had a profound effect on theories of antibody formation and how antibody specificity was generated. Legend has it that at the annual meeting of the American Association of Immunology where she first presented her data, her talk was received by a standing ovation—quite high praise indeed."

In 1965, Koshland became a researcher at the University of California, Berkeley, joining its faculty in 1970. She studied molecular biology with David Baltimore in his M.I.T. lab in the late 1970s. From 1982 to 1989 she was chair of Berkeley's Department of Microbiology and Immunology. Later she led that department's Graduate Affairs Division. She also served on the board of the National Science Foundation and was a president of the Council of American Association of Immunologists in 1982 and in 1983. She won the inaugural Excellence in Science Award from the Federation of American Societies for Experimental Biology in 1989 and was honored by the AAI Committee for the Status of Women in Science.

Koshland died in Berkeley, California, on October 28, 1997, of lung cancer.

The Marian Koshland Science Museum was in Washington, D.C., and featured exhibits geared toward the general public; the Marian E. Koshland Integrated Natural Science Center at Haverford College houses the elite liberal arts college's science departments. Both are named in her honor. Koshland's children, Catherine Koshland and Douglas Koshland, both attended Haverford and, as of September 2021, hold positions at U.C. Berkeley; Catherine has served as executive vice chancellor and provost since July 1, 2021, and Douglas is a professor of molecular and cell biology.

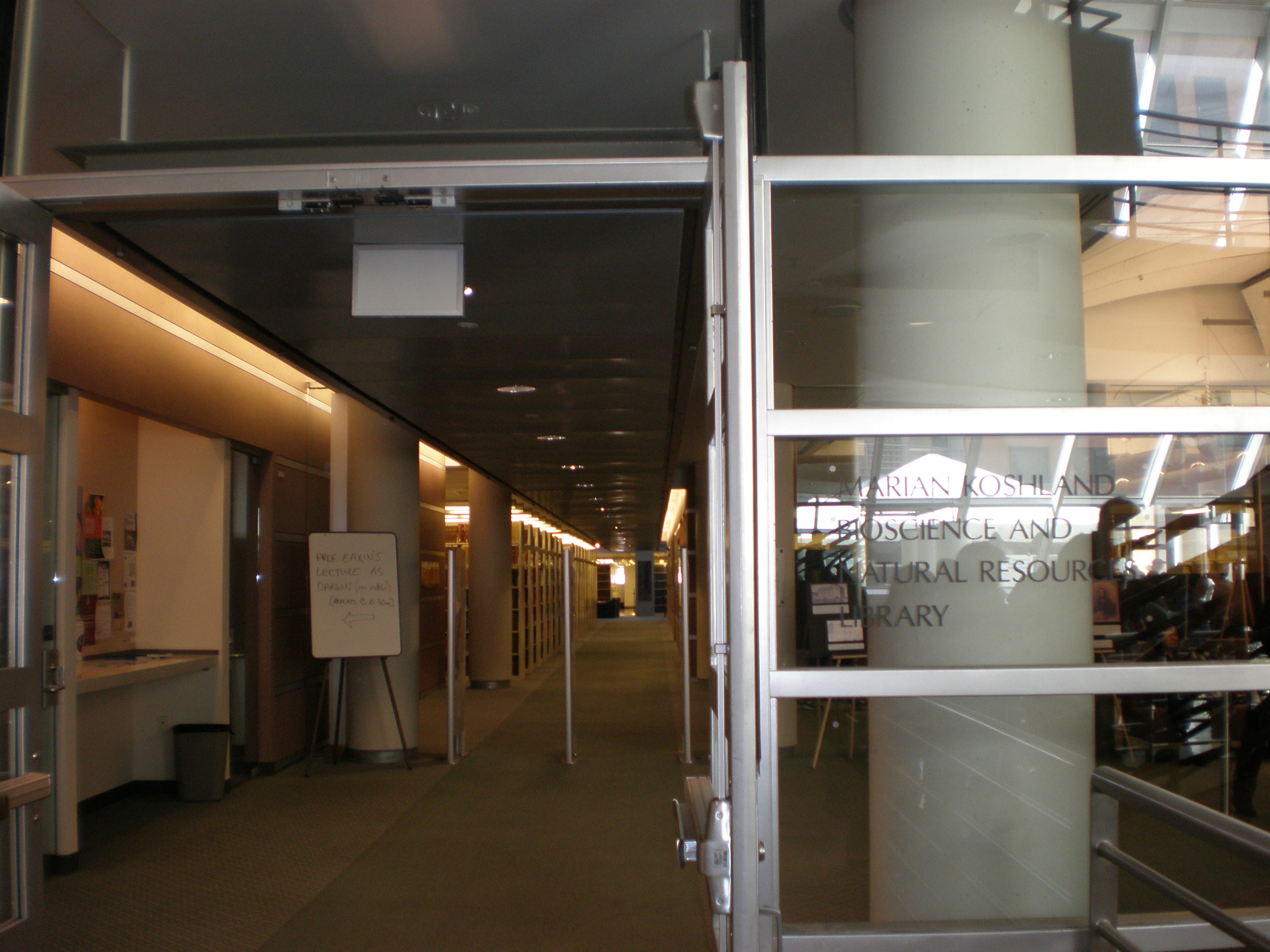
Entrance to the Marian Koshland Bioscience and Natural Resource Library in the Valley Life Sciences Building, at U.C.B.

== Publications ==
- Koshland, Marian E.; Englberger, Frieda M.; Shapanka, Rosyln (March 1964). "Differences in the Amino Acid Composition of a Third Rabbit Antibody". Science. 143 (3612): 1330–1331. Bibcode:1964Sci...143.1330K. doi:10.1126/science.143.3612.1330. PMID 17799240. S2CID 35924531.
- Koshland, Marian Elliott (April 1996). "Sheer Luck Made Me An Immunologist". Annual Review of Immunology. 14: viii–xv. doi:10.1146/annurev.immunol.14.1.00. PMID 8962690.
