= Sally Rockey =

American researcher (born 1958)

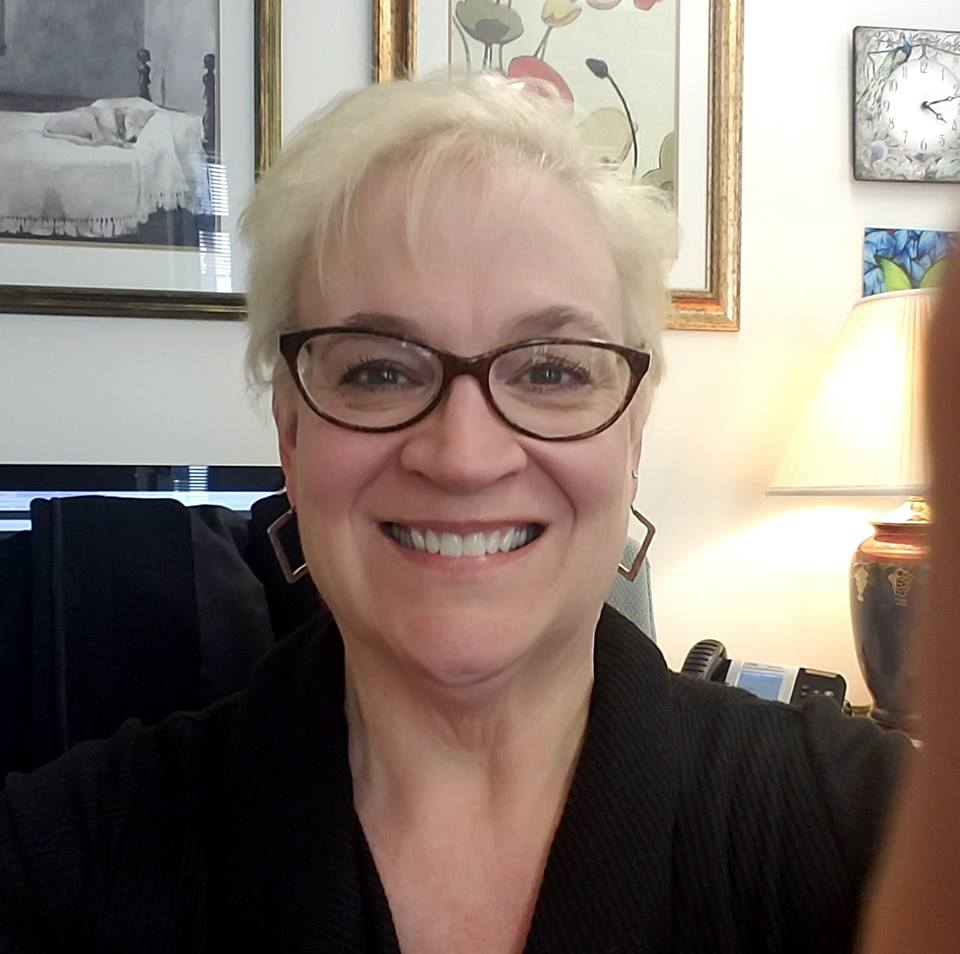
- Portrait of Dr. Sally Rockey
- Born: February 13, 1958 (age 68)
- Education: Bowling Green State University; Ohio State University
- Occupations: Executive Director, Foundation for Food and Agriculture Research

Sarah (Sally) Jean Rockey (born February 13, 1958) was the inaugural executive director of the Foundation for Food and Agriculture Research, an organization that funds innovative agricultural research efforts through private/public partnerships. Prior to this position, Rockey was deputy director for Extramural Research at the United States National Institutes of Health (NIH), overseeing research administration for the largest research program in the world.

== Early years ==
Rockey is the third of four children of Ann Kaserman Rockey and Lee Cady Rockey. She moved often as a child as her father was transferred through his job at General Electric. When she was ten, her family settled in Lake Lucerne in Bainbridge, Ohio. She graduated from Kenston High School in 1976, attended Bowling Green State University for two years and transferred to the Ohio State University where she received three degrees, a BS in Zoology and a Masters and Ph.D. in Entomology. After graduation she held a postdoctoral position at the Department of Entomology, University of Wisconsin.

== Career ==
Rockey's career in research and grants administration began in 1986 at the U.S. Department of Agriculture, Cooperative State Research, Education and Extension Service where she held a variety of positions prior to appointment as the head of the Competitive Grants Program and finally the agency's Chief Information Officer in 2002. She moved to NIH in 2005 to apply her skills in research administration to the large biomedical research portfolio. She oversaw many complex initiatives while at NIH and gave special attention to workforce issues, as promoting the next generation of scientists has been a linchpin of her career.

Rockey was considered a leader in research administration and has used her various positions to further the application of science to real world problems. While at NIH, Rockey used this position to advocate for greater transparency in NIH administration, establishing the blog "Rock Talk" as a platform for communicating with the community of biomedical researchers receiving NIH extramural funding and with the general public. The Rock Talk blog was pioneering for the Federal government, as one of the first blogs to accept public comments and was the subject of a feature in Nature magazine.

Rockey has also published commentary on scientific career development and, with NIH Director Francis Collins, on managing financial conflicts of interest in scientific research.

Rockey retired from Federal public service after 30 years and returned to her roots in agriculture when she was appointed as the first executive director for the Foundation for Food and Agriculture Research. FFAR funds innovation to advance agriculture through public-private research partnerships. Rockey was considered one of the central voices globally for promoting agricultural sciences as a way to improve people's lives and worked closely with Congress, Federal agencies, and other significant organizations on agricultural science funding and policy issues.

Rockey served for five years as the vice-president of the Human Frontiers of Science Program, and international research program located in Strasbourg, France.

Rockey has given hundreds of talks on various topics during the course of her career and has been featured on radio, podcasts and occasionally television.

Rockey has 13 research publications and numerous other public commentaries, editorials, or focus pieces.

== Awards and honors ==
- Joseph F. Carrabino Award, National Council of University Research Administrators (NCURA) 2014 “For Significant Contribution to Research Administration”
- Presidential Rank Award (2004).
- Fellow of the Entomological Society of America (2017)
