= Foundation for Food and Agriculture Research =

U.S. nonprofit organization supporting agricultural research

- Abbreviation: FFAR
- Formation: 2014
- Type: Nonprofit organization
- Legal status: 501(c)(3) nonprofit
- Purpose: Agricultural research funding
- Headquarters: Washington, D.C., United States
- Website: foundationfar.org

The Foundation for Food and Agriculture Research (FFAR) is a United States nonprofit organization established by Congress in the Agricultural Act of 2014 to fund agricultural research through public–private partnerships and matching federal and non-federal investments.

== History ==
FFAR was created as part of the Agricultural Act of 2014 (the 2014 Farm Bill), which allocated an initial $200 million in federal funding to establish the foundation and required that funds be matched by non-federal contributions. The creation of FFAR was described as a major component of the farm bill’s agricultural research provisions. The foundation’s funding model was continued in subsequent legislation, including the Agriculture Improvement Act of 2018.

Prior to its establishment, scientific societies and policy groups proposed the creation of a foundation to leverage public–private funding for agricultural research. FFAR was intended to complement existing U.S. Department of Agriculture research programs by supporting collaborative and innovative research initiatives.

The Agriculture Improvement Act of 2018 reauthorized FFAR and provided an additional $185 million in federal funding, while expanding requirements for transparency, stakeholder engagement, and long-term strategic planning, and clarifying its authority to raise matching funds from non-federal sources.

Sally Rockey, a former Deputy Director for Extramural Research at the National Institutes of Health, was appointed as the inaugural executive director of FFAR in 2015. In 2022, Saharah Moon Chapotin was appointed executive director of FFAR, succeeding Sally Rockey.

== Mission and activities ==
FFAR supports research aimed at improving agricultural productivity, sustainability, and food security. Its mission includes advancing scientific innovation through partnerships among government agencies, academic institutions, nonprofit organizations, and the private sector.

Research funded by FFAR spans multiple priority areas, including:

- soil health and sustainable water management
- crop improvement and next-generation crops
- animal health and production systems
- food safety, nutrition, and human health
- agricultural technology and innovation

The foundation also invests in workforce development through fellowships, grants, and early-career awards for scientists in food and agriculture.

FFAR-funded projects have addressed a range of agricultural challenges, including improving crop productivity, enhancing soil health, advancing animal systems, and developing sustainable agricultural practices. The foundation has also supported research into photosynthetic efficiency, ecosystem services, and climate-resilient agricultural systems.

== Funding model ==
FFAR operates as a 501(c)(3) nonprofit organization and uses a matching-funds model in which federal funds are paired with private-sector or non-federal contributions. This model is intended to increase the overall investment in agricultural research and encourage collaboration across sectors.

By leveraging public and private funding, FFAR supports large-scale collaborative research initiatives designed to address national and global challenges in agriculture and food systems.

== See also ==
- United States Department of Agriculture
- Agricultural research
- Agriculture Improvement Act of 2018
