= National Academy of Sciences Building =

- National Academy of Sciences building
- U.S. National Register of Historic Places
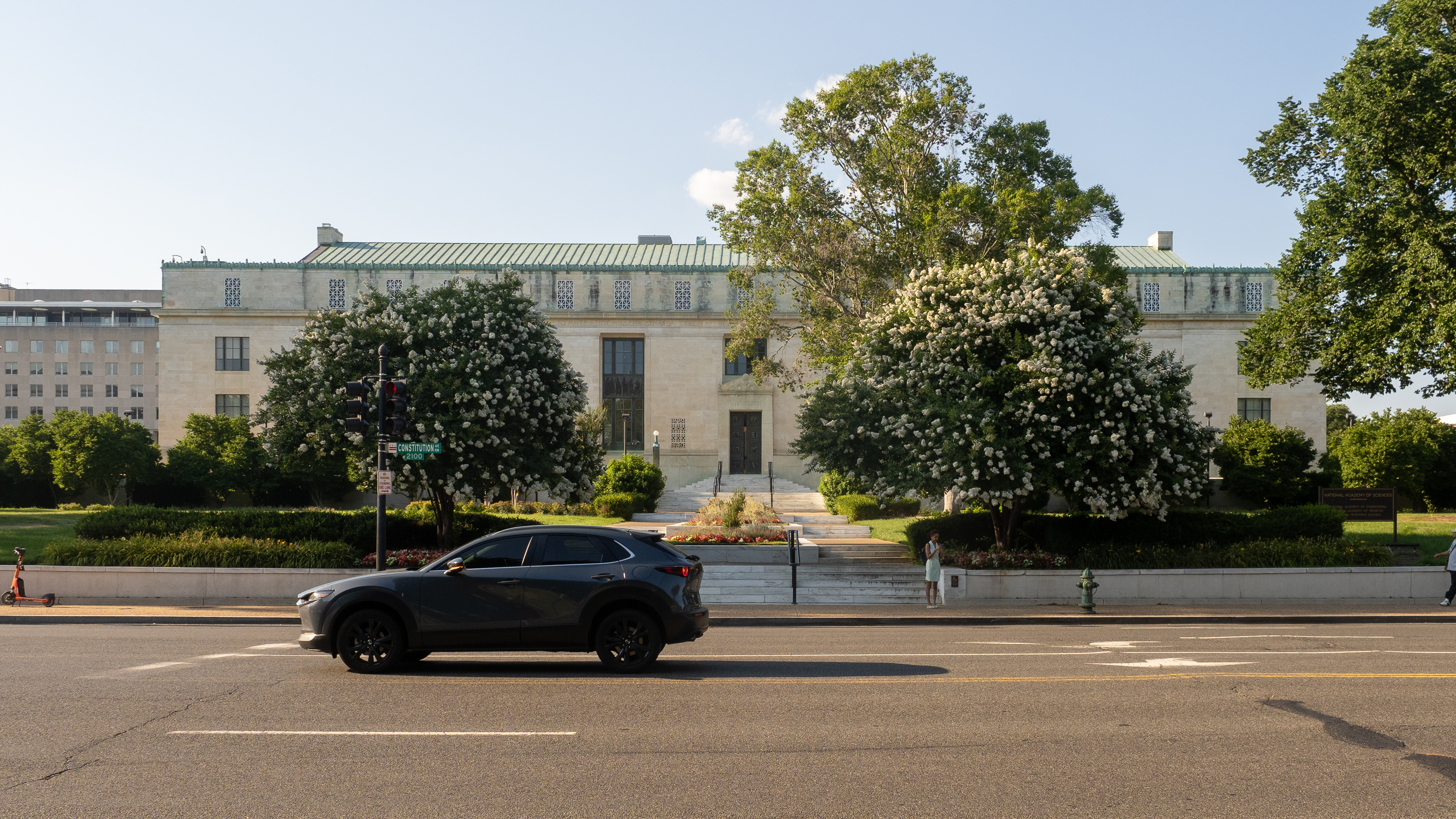
- National Academy of Sciences Building in 2024

- Location within Central Washington, D.C.
- Location: 2101 Constitution Ave., NW. Washington, D.C.
- Coordinates: 38°53′34.8″N 77°2′51.72″W
- Architect: Bertram Grosvenor Goodhue
- NRHP reference No.: 74002168
- Added to NRHP: March 15, 1974

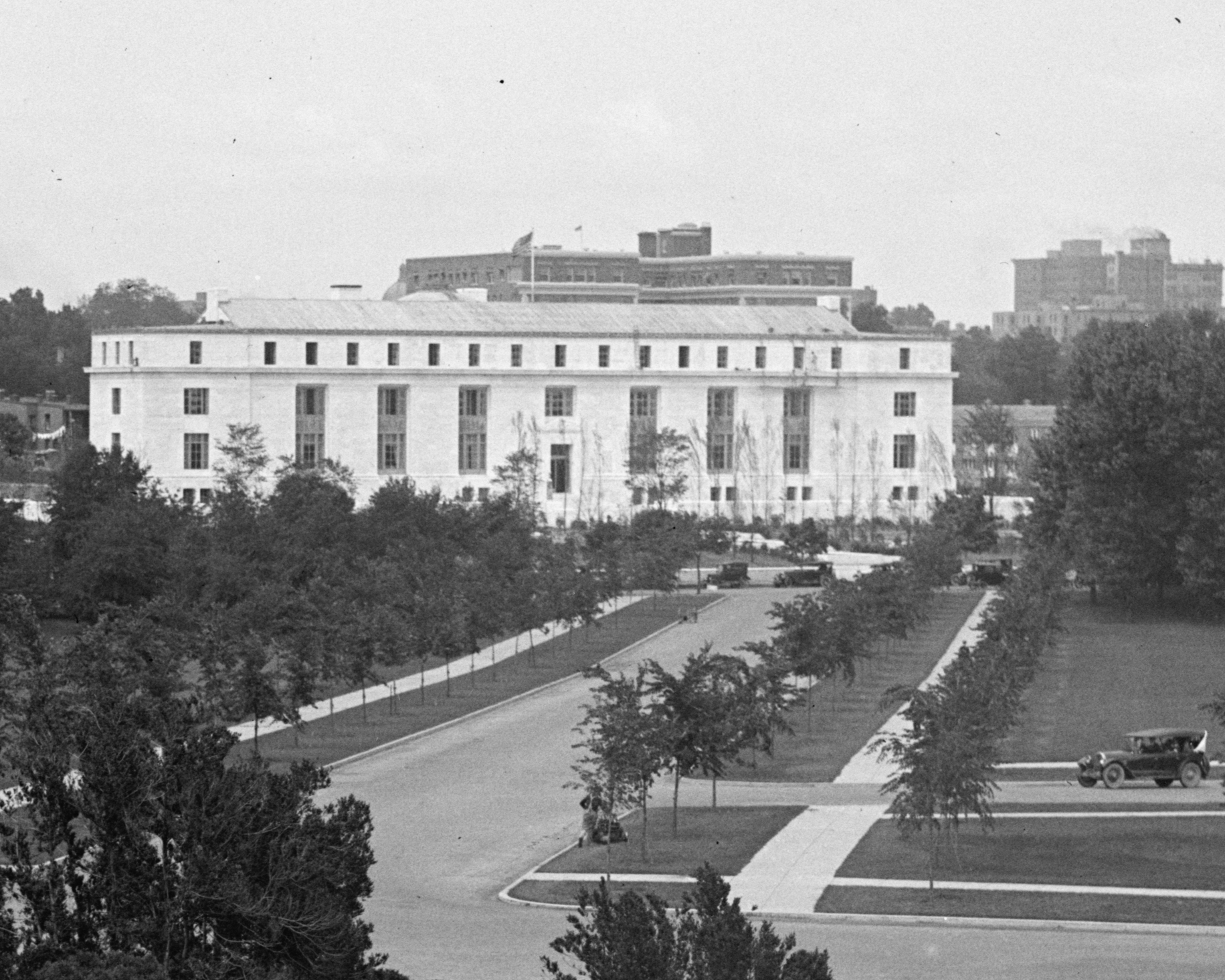
National Academy of Science & Research Commission building in June 1924

The National Academy of Sciences (NAS) Building houses the executive offices of the National Academy of Sciences, National Academy of Engineering, and the National Academy of Medicine. It is located at 2101 Constitution Avenue, N.W., in Washington, D.C. Designed by Bertram Grosvenor Goodhue, the building's architecture combines elements of Classicism and irregular forms into a new "Alexandrian" style. President Calvin Coolidge gave the principal address at the building dedication ceremony on April 28, 1924, referring to the building as a "Temple of Science".
