= James E. Darnell =

American biologist

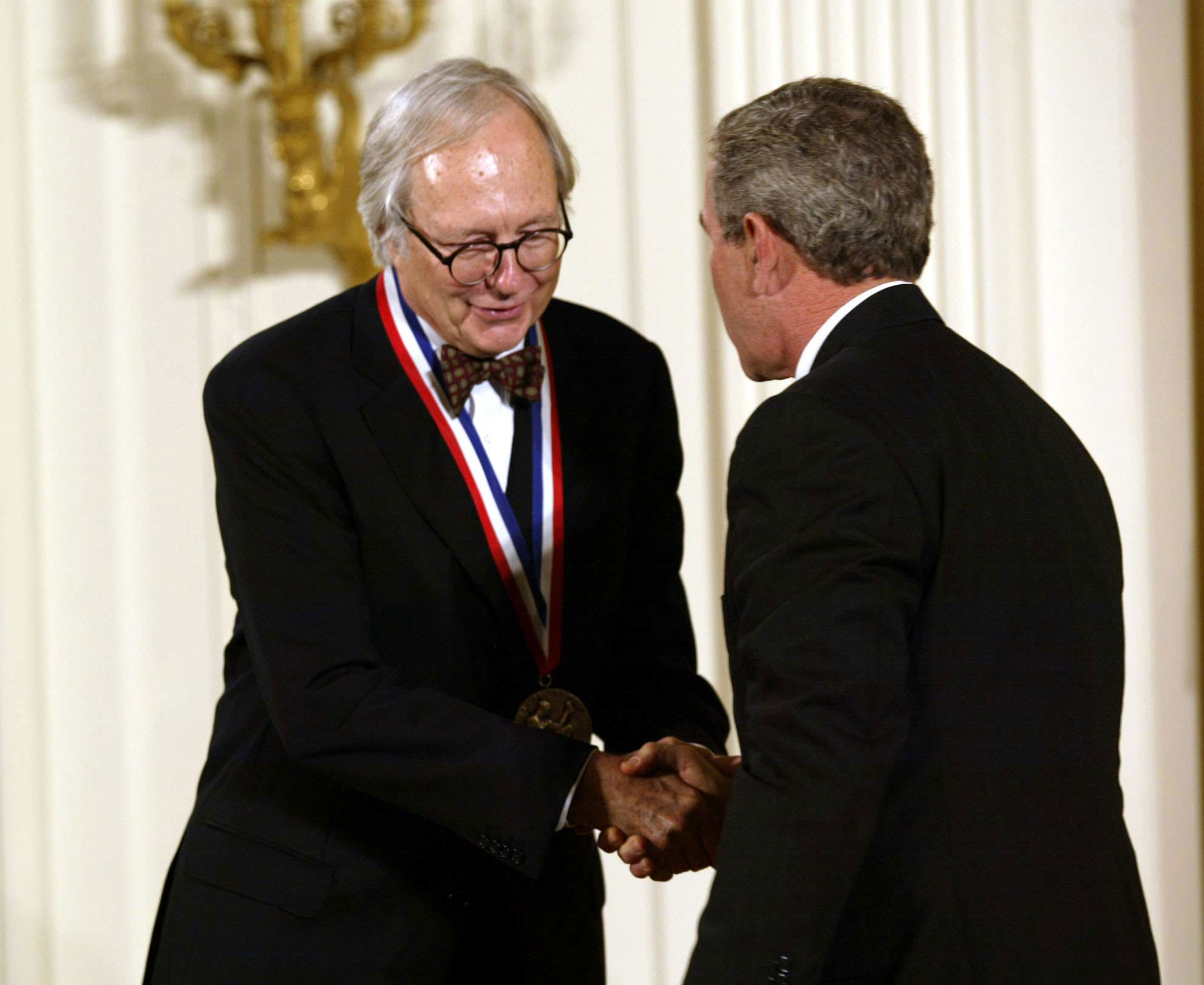
- James E. Darnell receiving the 2002 National Medal of Science
- Born: September 9, 1930 (age 95); Columbus, Mississippi
- Citizenship: United States
- Education: University of Mississippi (B.A., 1951); Washington University School of Medicine in St. Louis (M.D., 1955)
- Known for: Original discovery of RNA processing in eukaryotes.; Determined how extracellular proteins (cytokines) stimulates nuclear gene expression.
- Awards: Albany Medical Center Prize (2012); Albert Lasker Special Achievement Award (2002); National Medal of Science (2002); E.B. Wilson Medal (1998); Canada Gairdner International Award (1986)
- Scientific career
- Fields: Biochemistry; Molecular Biology; Developmental Biology
- Workplaces: The Rockefeller University; Massachusetts Institute of Technology; Albert Einstein College of Medicine; Columbia University

James Edwin Darnell Jr. (born September 9, 1930, Columbus, Mississippi) is an American biologist who made significant contributions to RNA processing and cytokine signaling and is author of the cell biology textbook Molecular Cell Biology. He is the Vincent Astor Professor Emeritus of Molecular Cell Biology at The Rockefeller University.

In 2004, he was elected a foreign member of the Royal Swedish Academy of Sciences. He became a member of the American Philosophical Society in 2013.

Since 2013, Darnell has been listed on the Advisory Council of the National Center for Science Education.

He is married to Norwegian former model and dress shop owner Kristin Holby, known as "Clotilde", whose daughter Phoebe, a financial analyst, is married to businessman Divya Narendra.

== Awards ==
- 1999 Dickson Prize
- 1999 Cancer Research Institute William B. Coley Award
- 2002 National Medal of Science
- 2002 Albert Lasker Special Achievement Award
- 2010 Hope Funds Award in Basic Research
- 2012 Albany Medical Center Prize
