= Genetics Institute =

Genetics Institute, Inc.
- Type: Defunct
- Industry: Biotechnology
- Founded: 1980
- Defunct: 1996
- Fate: acquisition by Wyeth
- Successor: Wyeth
- Headquarters: Cambridge, MA, United States

Genetics Institute, Inc. was a biotechnology research and development company founded by Thomas Maniatis and Mark Ptashne, two Harvard molecular biologists, in 1980 in Massachusetts. Originally operating out of Ptashne's house in Boston, the company found more spacious quarters first in Boston and then Cambridge before expanding further. Gabriel Schmergel joined soon afterwards as CEO.

Many leading scientists joined G.I. from academia and it proved to be a fertile source of patents for some time. The AU-rich element that regulates mRNA stability and translation was discovered and characterized at G.I. in 1985.

== Historical background ==
One of the two largest national clusters of biotechnology in the U.S. (the other being the San Francisco Bay area), the greater Boston area has been the birthplace of many innovative corporations and non-profit research centers. Beginning in the late 1970s and 1980s, this biotech trend saw three early large for-profit corporations: Biogen (now Biogen Idec), Genzyme, and Genetics Institute. MIT's Whitehead Institute was one of the seminal non-profit research centers in this field locally, among many others. Aside from MIT, Harvard, Boston University and several teaching hospitals including Massachusetts General Hospital and Brigham and Women's were important contributors to the local field's development.

== Products ==
G.I.'s Products (or potential candidates for products) included forms of M-CSF, GM-CSF interleukin-3, rPSGL-Ig , interleukin-11 (Neumega), bone morphogenetic protein 2, recombinant human Factor IX, and recombinant human Factor VIII (Recombinate); as well as tissue plasminogen activator and erythropoietin that both involved costly, complex lawsuits over patent infringement with competitors.

Toward the end of its independent existence, G.I. created a program to share "a library of several thousand genes and their related proteins that could be scanned for potential new drugs."

This program was based on a G.I. technology that allowed it to identify proteins secreted by cells and therefore more likely to be therapeutic in the body.

== Dissolution ==
Wyeth (American Home Products at the time) acquired a majority interest in GI in 1992 and the remaining interest at the end of 1996. The company became part of Wyeth's Research division.
