= National Academy of Sciences =

Science branch of the US National Academies

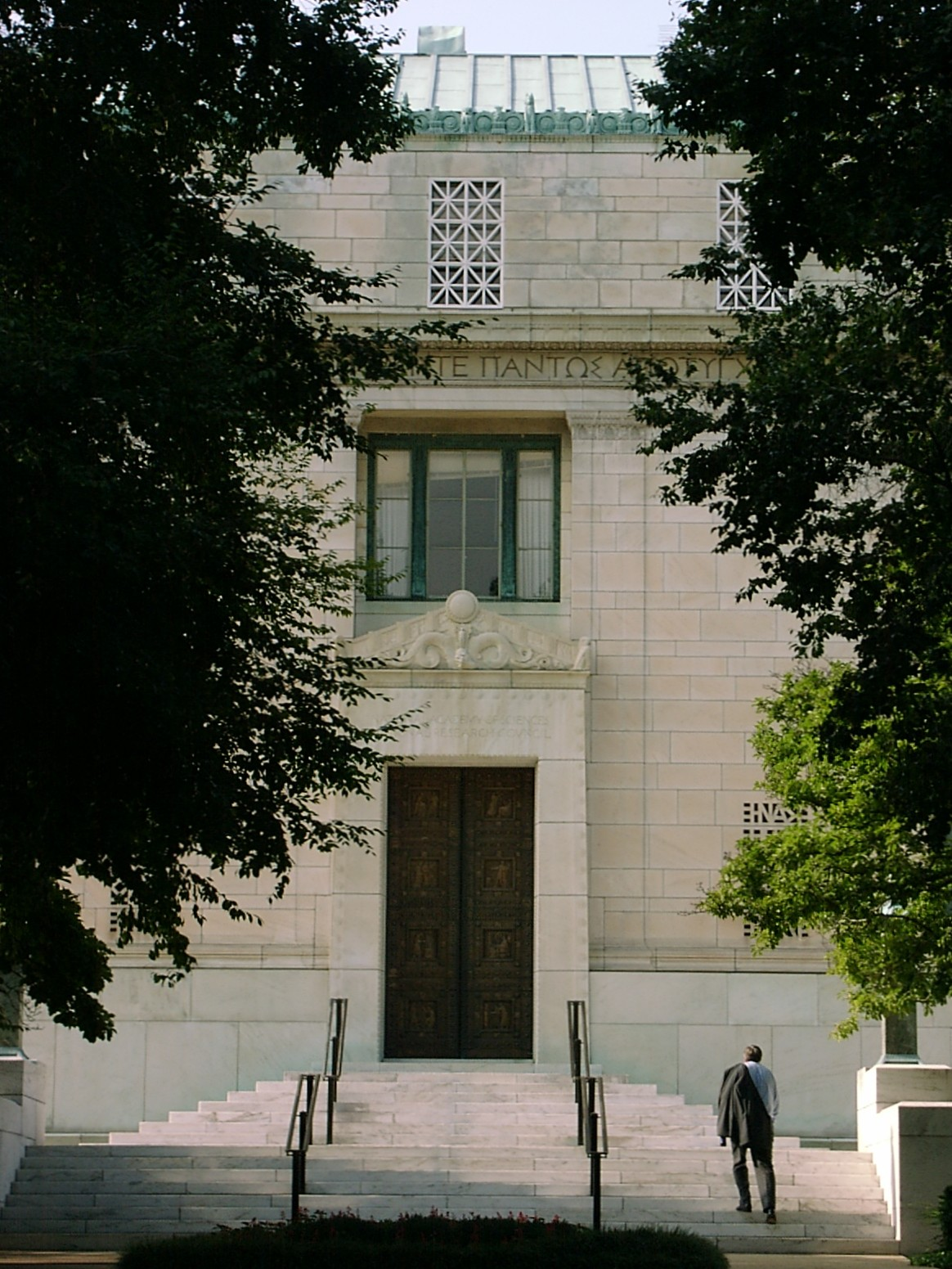
- The National Academy of Sciences building in Washington, D.C. in 2000
- Formation: March 3, 1863; 163 years ago
- Founders: Alexander Dallas Bache; Abraham Lincoln
- Founded at: 2101 Constitution Avenue, NW, Washington, D.C., U.S. 20418
- Type: NGO
- Coordinates: 38°53′46″N 77°02′12″W
- Parent organization: National Academies of Sciences, Engineering, and Medicine
- Endowment: $553.9 million (2020)
- Website: nasonline.org

The National Academy of Sciences (NAS) is an American nonprofit, non-governmental organization. NAS is part of the National Academies of Sciences, Engineering, and Medicine, along with the National Academy of Engineering (NAE) and the National Academy of Medicine (NAM).

As a national academy, new members of the organization are elected annually by current members, based on their distinguished and continuing achievements in original research. Election to the National Academy is one of the highest honors in the scientific field in the United States. Members of the National Academy of Sciences serve pro bono as "advisers to the nation" on science, engineering, and medicine. The group holds a congressional charter under Title 36 of the United States Code.

Congress legislated and President Abraham Lincoln signed an Act of Congress (1863) establishing the National Academy of Sciences as an independent, trusted nongovernmental institution, created for the purpose of "providing independent, objective advice to the nation on matters related to science and technology [and] to provide scientific advice to the government 'whenever called upon' by any government department." This objective gave the academy the purpose of enriching and providing resources to any part of the federal government—rather than serving a single branch or executive agency, in contrast to the Library of Congress or many entities that report to the president. The goal was somewhat unusual at the time, and also different from other knowledge-based entities serving a branch of government, such as the Library of Congress. The academy receives no compensation from the government for its services.

== Overview ==
As of 2024, the National Academy of Sciences includes 2,687 NAS members and 531 international members. It employed about 1,100 staff in 2005. Some 190 members have won a Nobel Prize. By its own admission in 1989, the addition of women to the academy "continues at a dismal trickle"; at that time there were 1,516 male members and 57 female members.

The National Academy of Sciences is one of the 135 member organizations of the International Science Council (ISC). Although there is no formal relationship with state and local academies of science, there often is informal dialogue. The National Academy is governed by a 17-member Council, made up of five officers (president, vice president, home secretary, international secretary, and treasurer) and 12 Councilors, all of whom are elected from among the academy membership. Agencies of the United States government fund about 85 percent of the academy's activities. Further funding comes from state governments, private foundations, and industrial organizations.

The council has the ability, ad hoc, to delegate certain tasks to committees. For example, the Committee on Animal Nutrition has produced a series of Nutrient requirements of domestic animals reports since at least 1944, each one being initiated by a different subcommittee of experts in the field, for example, on dairy cattle.

The National Academy of Sciences meets annually in Washington, D.C., which is documented in the Proceedings of the National Academy of Sciences (PNAS), its scholarly journal. The National Academies Press is the publisher for the National Academies and makes more than 5,000 publications freely available on its website.

From 2004 to 2017, the National Academy of Sciences administered the Marian Koshland Science Museum to provide public exhibits and programming related to its policy work. The museum's exhibits focused on climate change and infectious disease. In 2017, the museum closed and made way for a new science outreach program called LabX.

== History ==
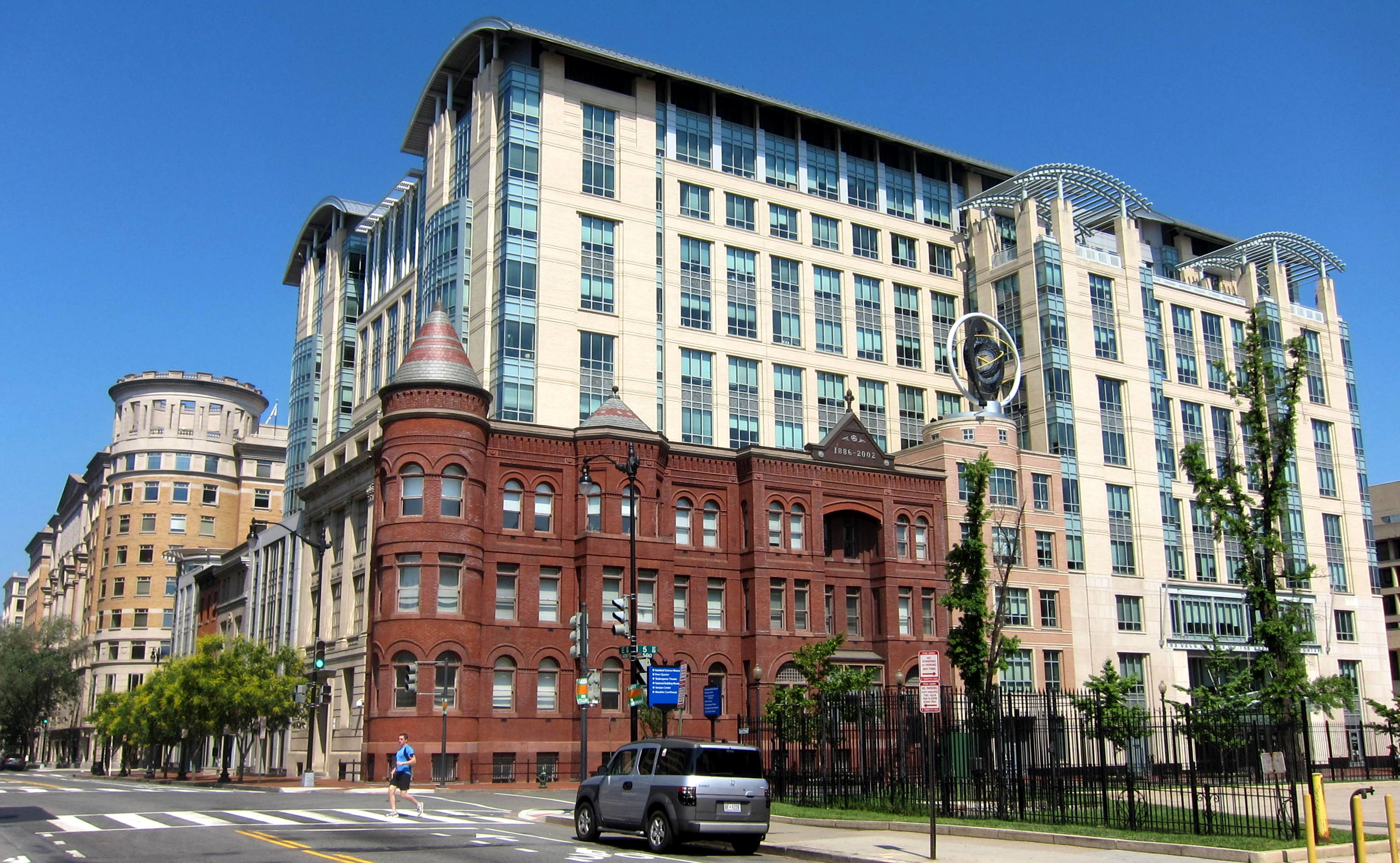
The Keck Center of the National Academies in Washington, D.C., one of several facilities where the National Academy of Sciences maintains offices

The Act of Incorporation, signed by President Abraham Lincoln on March 3, 1863, created the National Academy of Sciences and named 50 charter members. Many of the original NAS members came from the so-called "Scientific Lazzaroni", an informal network of mostly physical scientists working in the vicinity of Cambridge, Massachusetts (c. 1850).

In 1863, the organizers enlisted the support of Alexander Dallas Bache and Charles Henry Davis, the latter a professional astronomer who had been recently recalled from the Navy to Washington, D.C. to head the Bureau of Navigation. They also elicited support from Swiss-American geologist Louis Agassiz and American mathematician Benjamin Peirce, who together planned the steps whereby the National Academy of Sciences was to be established. Senator Henry Wilson of Massachusetts was to name Agassiz to the Board of Regents of the Smithsonian Institution.

Agassiz was to come to Washington, D.C., at the government's expense to plan the organization with the others. This bypassed Joseph Henry, who was reluctant to have a bill for such an academy presented to Congress. He believed that such a resolution would be "opposed as something at variance with our democratic institutions". Nevertheless, Henry later became the second President of NAS. Agassiz, Davis, Peirce, Benjamin Gould, and Senator Wilson met at Bache's house and "hurriedly wrote the bill incorporating the Academy, including in it the name of fifty incorporators".

During the last hours of the session, when the Senate was immersed in the rush of last-minute business before its adjournment, Senator Wilson introduced the bill. Without examining it or debating its provisions, both the Senate and House approved it, and President Lincoln signed it.

Although hailed as a great step forward in government recognition of the role of science in American society, at the time, the National Academy of Sciences created enormous ill feelings among scientists, whether or not they were named as incorporators.

The act states:

[T]he Academy shall, whenever called upon by any department of the Government, investigate, examine, experiment, and report upon any subject of science or art, the actual expense of such investigations, examinations, experiments, and reports to be paid from appropriations which may be made for the purpose, but the Academy shall receive no compensation whatever for any services to the Government of the United States.

The National Academies did not solve the problems facing a nation in Civil War as the Lazzaroni had hoped, nor did it centralize American scientific efforts. However, election to the National Academy did come to be considered "the pinnacle of scientific achievement for Americans" until the establishment of the Nobel Prize at the end of the 19th century.

In 1870, the congressional charter was amended to remove the limitation on the number of members.

In 2013, astrophysicist Neil deGrasse Tyson was asked to write a speech for the 150th anniversary of the Gettysburg Address in which he made the point that one of Lincoln's greatest legacies was establishing NAS in that same year, which had the long-term effect of "setting our Nation on a course of scientifically enlightened governance, without which we all may perish from this Earth".

== Membership ==
The academy currently (as of 2026) has 2,705 active members, with 557 international, non-voting members. 3218 of them are living. Existing members elect new members for life. Up to 120 members are elected annually, while up to 30 foreign citizens may be elected as international members annually. The election process begins with a formal nomination, followed by a vetting period, and culminates in a final ballot at the academy's annual meeting in April each year. Members are affiliated with a specific scientific field in one of six so-called "classes", which include: Physical and Mathematical Sciences; Biological Sciences; Engineering and Applied Sciences; Biomedical Sciences; Behavioral and Social Sciences; and Applied Biological, Agricultural, and Environmental Sciences.

Over the entire history of the NAS, Harvard University is associated with the most members (331) overall, while the University of California at Berkeley is associated with the most members (255) without including the medical school. Examples of top schools, UC Berkeley/MIT/Princeton/Caltech do not have medical schools, while Harvard/Stanford do. The top ten institutions, two of which are from the University of California System and another four of which are in the Ivy League, account for nearly 28% of all members ever elected. Those ten are also precisely the only institutions in the entire history of the NAS to have had 100 or more members overall.

On the list for living members, only 14 institutions have 50 or more members overall, including the medical school (where it applies). They represent 32% of all living members of the NAS.

Top 14 Primary Institutions (50 or more Living Members)
Institution	Living Members	
Institution	Including Medical School	Excluding Medical School
Harvard University	179	113
Stanford University	178	149
University of California, Berkeley	143	143
Massachusetts Institute of Technology	122	122
Princeton University	90	90
Columbia University	73	57
Yale University	73	56
California Institute of Technology	72	72
University of Chicago	55	55
University of California, San Diego	52	50
Max Planck Institutes (Germany)	52	52
University of Washington	51	46
University of California, Los Angeles	49	42
National Institutes of Health	45	45

Top 10 Primary Institutions (All-time Members)
Institution	All-time Members (1863–2024)	
Institution	Excluding Medical School	Including Medical School
University of California, Berkeley	255	255
Harvard University	235	331
Stanford University	234	274
Massachusetts Institute of Technology	219	219
Princeton University	133	133
California Institute of Technology	132	132
University of Chicago	129	130
Columbia University	124	136
University of California, San Diego	116	122
Yale University	103	137

== Facilities ==
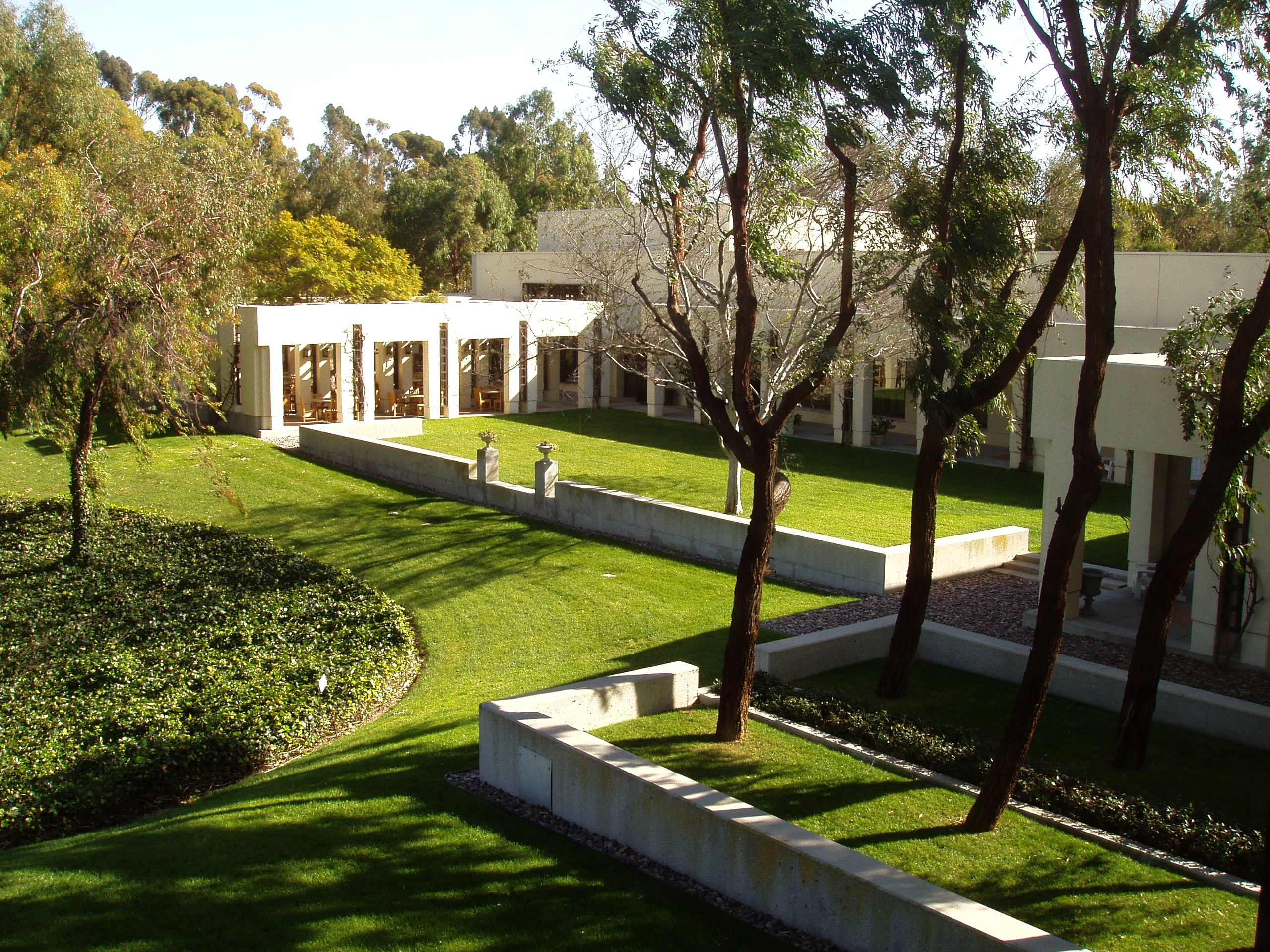
The National Academies' Beckman Conference Center in Irvine, California

The National Academy of Sciences maintains multiple buildings around the United States. The National Academy of Sciences Building is located at 2101 Constitution Avenue, in northwest Washington, D.C.; it sits on the National Mall, adjacent to the Marriner S. Eccles Federal Reserve Board Building and in front of the headquarters of the U.S. State Department. The building has a neoclassical architectural style and was built by architect Bertram Grosvenor Goodhue. The building was dedicated in 1924 and is listed on the National Register of Historic Places. Goodhue engaged a team of artists and architectural sculptors, including Albert Herter, Lee Lawrie, and Hildreth Meière to design interior embellishments celebrating the history and significance of science. The building is used for lectures, symposia, exhibitions, and concerts, in addition to annual meetings of the NAS, NAE, and NAM. Cultural Programs of the National Academy of Sciences hosts exhibitions exploring intersections of art, science, and culture such as Mathemalchemy. The 2012 Presidential Award for Math and Science Teaching ceremony was held here on March 5, 2014. Approximately 150 staff members work at the NAS Building. In June 2012, it reopened to visitors after a major two-year restoration project, which restored and improved the building's historic spaces, increased accessibility, and brought the building's aging infrastructure and facilities up to date.

More than 1,000 National Academies staff members work at The Keck Center of the National Academies at 500 Fifth Street in northwest Washington, D.C. The Keck Center provides meeting space and houses the National Academies Press Bookstore. The Marian Koshland Science Museum of the National Academy of Sciences – formerly located at 525 E St., N.W. – hosted visits from the public, school field trips, and permanent science exhibits.

NAS also maintains conference centers in California and Massachusetts. The Arnold and Mabel Beckman Center is located on 100 Academy Drive in Irvine, California, near the campus of the University of California, Irvine; it offers a conference center and houses several NAS programs. The J. Erik Jonsson Conference Center, located at 314 Quissett Avenue in Woods Hole, Massachusetts, is an NAS conference facility.

== Presidents ==
The president is the head of the academy, elected by a majority vote of the membership to serve in this position for a term to be determined by the governing Council, not to exceed six years, and may be re-elected for a second term. Terms usually start on July 1 and end on June 30. The academy has had 22 presidents since its foundation. The current president is geophysicist Marcia K. McNutt, the first woman to hold this position. Her term expires on June 30, 2026.

No.	Image	President	Term	Notes
1		Alexander Dallas Bache	1863–1867	
2		Joseph Henry	1868–1878	
3		William Barton Rogers	1879–1882	
4		Othniel Charles Marsh	1883–1895	
5		Wolcott Gibbs	1895–1900	
6		Alexander Agassiz	1901–1907	
7		Ira Remsen	1907–1913	
8		William Henry Welch	1913–1917	
9		Charles Doolittle Walcott	1917–1923	
10		Albert Abraham Michelson	1923–1927	
11		Thomas Hunt Morgan	1927–1931	
12		William Wallace Campbell	1931–1935	
13		Frank Rattray Lillie	1935–1939	
14		Frank Baldwin Jewett	1939–1947	
15		Alfred Newton Richards	1947–1950	
16		Detlev Wulf Bronk	1950–1962	
17		Frederick Seitz	1962–1969	
18		Philip Handler	1969–1981	
19		Frank Press	1981–1993	
20		Bruce Michael Alberts	1993–2005	
21		Ralph J. Cicerone	2005–2016	
22		Marcia McNutt	2016–2026	
23		Neil Shubin	2026–present	

== Awards ==
The academy gives a number of different awards:

- General
  - Membership of the National Academy of Sciences (including international members)
  - John J. Carty Award for the Advancement of Science
  - William O. Baker Award for Initiatives in Research, formerly NAS Award for Initiatives in Research
  - NAS Award for Scientific Reviewing
  - NAS Award for Scientific Discovery
  - Public Welfare Medal
  - Raymond and Beverly Sackler Prize in Convergence Research
  - National Academies Communication Award, with other national academies
- Astronomy/Astrophysics
  - Henry Draper Medal
  - J. Lawrence Smith Medal
  - James Craig Watson Medal
- Behavioral/Social Sciences
  - Atkinson Prize in Psychological and Cognitive Sciences
  - William and Katherine Estes Award, formerly the NAS Award for Behavioral Research Relevant to the Prevention of Nuclear War
  - Troland Research Awards
- Biology and Medicine
  - Alexander Hollaender Award in Biophysics
  - Jessie Stevenson Kovalenko Medal
  - Richard Lounsbery Award
  - Gilbert Morgan Smith Medal
  - NAS Award in Molecular Biology
  - NAS Award in the Neurosciences
  - Pradel Research Award
  - Selman A. Waksman Award in Microbiology
- Chemistry
  - NAS Award in Chemical Sciences
  - NAS Award for Chemistry in Service to Society
- Earth and Environmental Sciences
  - Alexander Agassiz Medal
  - Arthur L. Day Prize and Lectureship
  - Daniel Giraud Elliot Medal
  - Mary Clark Thompson Medal
  - NAS Award in Early Earth and Life Sciences
  - Charles Doolittle Walcott Medal, part of the NAS Award in Early Earth and Life Sciences since 2008
  - Stanley Miller Medal, part of the NAS Award in Early Earth and Life Sciences since 2008
  - G. K. Warren Prize
- Engineering and Applied Sciences
  - J.C. Hunsaker Award – aeronautical engineering
  - Gibbs Brothers Medal – naval architecture, marine engineering
  - NAS Award for the Industrial Application of Science
  - NAS Prize in Food and Agriculture Sciences
- Mathematics and Computer Science
  - NAS Award in Mathematics
- Physics
  - Arctowski Medal
  - Comstock Prize in Physics
  - Alexander Hollaender Award in Biophysics

== Joint Declaration on Global Warming ==
In 2005, the national science academies of the G8 forum (including the National Academy of Sciences) and science academies of Brazil, China, and India (three of the largest emitters of greenhouse gases in the developing world) signed a statement on the global response to climate change. The statement stresses that the scientific understanding of climate change has become sufficiently clear to justify nations taking prompt action.

On May 7, 2010, a letter signed by 255 Academy members was published in Science magazine, decrying "political assaults" against climate change scientists. This was in response to a civil investigative demand on the University of Virginia (UVA) by Virginia Attorney General Ken Cuccinelli, seeking a broad range of documents from Michael E. Mann, a former UVA professor from 1999 to 2005. Mann, who currently works at the University of Pennsylvania, is a climate change researcher, and Cuccinelli alleges that Mann may have defrauded Virginia taxpayers in the course of his environmental research. Investigations had cleared Mann of charges that he falsified or suppressed data.

== Notable appointments ==
- 1873, Edward C. Pickering (1846–1919) was the youngest scientist elected
- 1924, Florence R. Sabin (1871–1953) was the first woman member to be elected
- 1965, David Blackwell (1919–2010) was the first African-American elected
- 2013, Ben Barres (1954–2017) was the first openly transgender scientist elected
- 2024, Peter Ungar (1963–present) was the first Arkansan elected

== See also ==
- American Academy of Arts and Sciences
- National Digital Library Program (NDLP)
- List of members of the National Academy of Sciences
- National Digital Information Infrastructure and Preservation Program (NDIIPP)
- National Science Foundation (NSF)
- National Academy of Sciences' Board on Science, Technology, and Economic Policy
- National Academy of Sciences Biographical Memoirs
- National Academies of Sciences, Engineering, and Medicine
- Astronomy and Astrophysics Decadal Survey
