= List of University of California, Berkeley alumni in business =

This page lists notable alumni and students of the University of California, Berkeley. Alumni who served as faculty are listed in bold font, with degree and year.

Notable faculty members are in the article List of UC Berkeley faculty.

== Founders and co-founders ==
- Tom Anderson, B.A. 1998 – co-founder of social networking website MySpace (acquired by News Corporation for $580 million)
- Brian Behlendorf – co-founder of the Apache Software Foundation, Mozilla Foundation board member, co-founder and CTO of CollabNet
- Joan Blades, B.A. 1977 – co-founder of software company Berkeley Systems (acquired by Sierra Online for $13 million), co-founder of political activist group MoveOn.org
- Richard C. Blum, B.S. 1958, M.B.A. 1959 – founder of private equity firm Blum Capital and the American Himalayan Foundation, regent of the University of California
- Richard Bolt, B.A. 1933, M.A. 1937, PhD 1939 – co-founder of ARPANET developer Bolt, Beranek and Newman (BBN)
- Eric Brewer, B.S. EECS 1989 – co-founder of web search engine company Inktomi (acquired by Yahoo! for $235 million), director of Intel Labs Berkeley; lead researcher at Google
- Gary Chevsky, attended for undergraduate degree 1990–1994 – co-founder and chief architect of web search engine company Ask Jeeves (known now as Ask.com, and acquired by InterActive Corp for $1.9 billion), senior VP at Symantec and YouSendIt
- Frederick Gardner Cottrell, B.S. Chemistry, 1896 – founder of patent holding company Research Corporation (which held the rights to the patent for Ernest O. Lawrence's cyclotron); inventor of the electrostatic precipitator, which removes pollution from factory exhaust fumes; inducted into the National Inventors Hall of Fame in 1992
- E. Morris Cox, B.S. 1924 – cofounder of Dodge & Cox investment management firm
- Toby Crabel – founded Crabel Fund Ltd and Crabel Fund LP , hedge fund manager and tennis player.
- Ed Crane, B.S. 1967 – founder of the Cato Institute
- David Culler, B.A. 1980 – chair of the Department of Computer Science at UC Berkeley, associate chair of the Electrical Engineering and Computer Sciences (UC Berkeley), and associate CIO of the College of Engineering (UC Berkeley); co-founder of smart grid monitoring company Arch Rock (acquired by Cisco Systems)
- Weili Dai, B.A. Computer Science 1984 – co-founder (with Sehat Sutardja MS 1983, PhD 1988 EECS and Pantas Sutardjai MS 1983, PhD 1988) of NASDAQ-100 broadband technology company Marvell Technology Group; namesake of Sutardja-Dai Hall on the UC Berkeley campus
- Lee Felsenstein, B.S. EECS 1972 – founder of Community Memory, designer of Osborne 1 computer, mediator of Homebrew Computer Club, from which would emerge 23 companies, including Apple Inc.
- Charles H. Ferguson, B.A. 1978 – co-founder of Vermeer Technologies Incorporated (acquired by Microsoft for $133 million), founder and president of Representational Pictures, winner of an Academy Award for Best Documentary for Inside Job (2010), Academy Award nomination for the documentary film No End in Sight (2007), former fellow at the Brookings Institution, lifelong member of the Council on Foreign Relations (also listed in "Academy Awards" section)
- Donald Fisher, B.S. 1951 – founder and former CEO of NYSE-listed S&P 500 clothing retailer The Gap, the largest apparel retailer in the United States
- Rob Fulop, B.S. CS 1980 – co-founder of video game companies Imagic and PF.Magic (creator of first virtual pets such as Dogz), Atari engineer, developed Missile Command and Night Driver
- Jean Paul Getty (attended and transferred to the University of Oxford) – founder of the Getty Oil Company
- Steve Gibson (attended) – founder of software security company Gibson Research Corporation and co-host of Security Now!
- Edward Ginzton, B.S. 1936, M.S. 1937 – researcher in klystron tubes, co-founder of Varian Associates (which later split into three companies: NYSE-listed Varian Medical Systems; Varian Semiconductor, acquired by Applied Materials for $4.9 billion; and Varian, Inc., acquired for 1.5 billion by Agilent Technologies)
- Diane Greene, M.S. CS 1988 – co-founder (with Mendel Rosenblum M.S. 1989, PhD 1992 and Edward Wang BS EECS 1983, MS 1988, PhD 1994) of NYSE-listed company VMWare
- Garrett Gruener, M.A. Political Science 1977 – co-founder of web search engine company Ask Jeeves (known now as Ask.com, and acquired by InterActive Corp for $1.9 billion)
- Ashraf Habibullah, S.E., M.S. 1970 – co-creator of the first computer-based structural-engineering applications and founder, President, and CEO of the structural-engineering software company Computers and Structures, Inc.
- John Hanke, M.B.A. 1996 – founder and CEO of Keyhole, Inc. (acquired by Google, renamed to Google Earth); founder of video game company Niantic (which created Pokémon Go)
- William Harlan, B.A. 1963 – founder of Harlan Estate, Bond, the Napa Valley Reserve, a cult wine Cabernet Sauvignon producer
- William Haseltine, B.A. 1966 – founder of Cambridge BioSciences and Dendreon Corp.
- F. Warren Hellman, B.A. 1955 – founder of Hellman & Friedman and Matrix Partners, former chairman, head of Investment Banking Division at Lehman Brothers; founder of the Hardly Strictly Bluegrass Festival, founder of The Bay Citizen (which later merged with the Center for Investigative Reporting)
- Larry Hillblom, J.D. – co-founder of DHL
- Mike Homer, B.S. 1981 – co-founder and former CEO of networking company Kontiki (acquired by VeriSign for $62 million)
- David T. Hon B.S. 1964 – physicist and founder of Dahon folding bicycles
- Chenming Hu, M.S. EE, PhD EE – Distinguished Professor of Microelectronics at UC Berkeley, co-founder and chairman of Celestry Design Technologies (acquired by Cadence Design Systems for over $100 million); recipient of the Phil Kaufman Award; co-inventor of the 3D transistor (the FinFET)
- Kai Huang, B.A. 1994 – co-founder (with Charles Huang BA 1992) and president of video game company RedOctane (publisher of Guitar Hero and acquired by Activision for $99.9 million)
- Jess S. Jackson, J.D. 1974 – founder of Kendall Jackson Wine Estates
- Bill Joy, M.S. 1982 – co-founder of computer software and hardware manufacturer Sun Microsystems (acquired by Oracle Corporation for $7.4 billion)
- Gene Kan, B.S. 1997 – founder of distributed search engine InfraSearch (acquired by Sun Microsystems for $12 million)
- Victor Koo, co-founder of Chinese video website Youku, whose American depositary shares were listed on the NYSE in 2010 and which was acquired by Alibaba in 2016 for $5.4 billion; formerly president of Chinese internet company Sohu
- Anthony Levandowski, B.S. Industrial Engineering 2002, M.S. IEOR 2003 – co-founder (with Andrew Schultz MS 2006 and Pierre-Yves Droz MS) of the secretive robotics hardware company 510 Systems, which developed the technologies for Google Street View and Google Car, and was acquired by Google)
- David R. Liu, PhD 1999 – co-founder of Editas Medicine
- Daniel S. Loeb, attended – founder of hedge fund Third Point Management
- Thomas J. Long, B.S. 1932 – founder of pharmaceutical retailer Longs Drugs (acquired by CVS Caremark for $2.54 billion)
- Samuel Madden, PhD – co-founder of Vertica Systems (acquired by Hewlett-Packard for $350 million, 2005 Technology Review Top 35
- Brian Maxwell, B.A. 1975 – co-founder (with Jennifer Maxwell, BS 1988) of energy bar food company PowerBar (acquired by Nestlé for $375 million); namesake of the Maxwell Family Field on the UC Berkeley campus
- Nick McKeown, MS 1992, PhD 1995 – co-founder and former CTO of Abrizio (acquired by PMC-Sierra for $400 million), co-founder and former CEO of Nemo Systems (acquired by Cisco Systems for $12.5 million), co-founder of software-defined networking company Nicira Networks (acquired by VMWare for $1.26 billion); Kleiner Perkins Professor of Computer Science at Stanford University
- Paul Merage, B.S. Business 1966, MBA 1968 – co-founder and former CEO of Hot Pockets frozen food company Chef America Inc. (acquired by Nestlé for $2.6 billion)
- Alan Miller, B.S. EECS 1973 – co-founder of first independent video game publisher Activision (known now as the NASDAQ-100 video game company Activision Blizzard), co-founder and former CEO of video game company Accolade (acquired by Infogrames for $60 million)
- Gordon Moore, B.S. 1950 – co-founder of NASDAQ-100 company Intel, originator of Moore's Law
- Lowell North, B.S .1951 – gold medalist at the 1968 Summer Olympics in Mexico City, founder of North Sails ("the world's leading sailmaker")
- Pierre Omidyar, attended to complete his undergraduate degree in computer science – founder of NASDAQ-100 web auction site eBay
- Kim Polese, B.S. 1984 (biophysics) – CEO of software company SpikeSource; original product manager of the Java at Sun Microsystems; co-founder and former CEO of software company Marimba (acquired by BMC Software for $239 million)
- Lars Rasmussen, PhD 1992 – co-founder of Where 2 Technologies (which was acquired by Google and renamed to Google Maps); co-founder of Google Wave; researcher at Facebook
- Warren Robinett, M.S. C.S. 1976 – originator of Easter eggs, co-founder of edutainment software company The Learning Company (acquired by Mattel for $3.8 billion)
- Andrew Rudd, MS 1972, MBA 1976, PhD 1978 – co-founder (with UC Berkeley professor Barr Rosenberg) and chairman and CEO of Barra Inc. (acquired by Morgan Stanley for $816.4 million and known as MSCI)
- John Schaeffer, 1971 – founder of NASDAQ-listed solar energy retailer Real Goods and the Solar Living Center
- Sally Schmitt, BS 1952 – founder of The French Laundry
- Jim Simons, PhD 1972 – founder of $84 billion hedge fund Renaissance Technologies; mathematician; philanthropist
- Nat Simons, B.S 1989, M.S. 1994 – founder of investment management firm Meritage Group ($12.3 billion AUM); founder of Prelude Ventures; businessman; philanthropist
- Charles Simonyi, B.S. 1972 – founder of Intentional Software; former head of Microsoft's flagship Office applications; fifth space tourist; at Xerox PARC he created the first WYSIWYG word processor, Bravo; joined Microsoft to spread the WYSIWYG and computer mouse gospel; originally from Hungary, he is the "Hungarian" in Hungarian notation, which he created
- Barclay Simpson, B.S. – founder of Simpson Manufacturing Company (NYSE: SSD) and one of the top benefactors of his alma mater ($50 million)
- James Solomon, B.S. EE, M.S. EE – founder of electronic design automation company SDA Systems (became NASDAQ-listed Cadence Design Systems); recipient of the Phil Kaufman Award, the "Nobel Prize" of the electronic design industry"
- Masayoshi Son, B.A. 1980 – founder and CEO of TYO-listed Japanese telecommunications and media giant Softbank, venture capital firm Softbank Capital
- Jacki Sorensen – founder of Aerobic Dancing, Inc., the first aerobics classes
- Dawn Song, PhD – founder of Oasis Labs
- Timothy Springer, B.A. biochemistry 1971 – immunologist and professor, Harvard Medical School and Boston Children’s Hospital; founder of biotech companies LeukoSite (acquired in 1998 by Millennium Pharmaceuticals for $635 million), Morphic Therapeutic, and Scholar Rock; main investor, Moderna and Selecta Biosciences
- Cornelius Vander Starr (attended) – founder of AIG Corporation
- Sehat Sutardja, M.S. 1983, PhD 1988 EECS – co-founder (with Weili Dai BA Computer Science 1984 and Pantas Sutardjai MS 1983, PhD 1988) of NASDAQ-100 broadband technology company Marvell Technology Group; namesake of Sutardja-Dai Hall on the UC Berkeley campus
- Jon F. Vein, B.A. – founder of MarketShare (acquired for $450 million by Neustar); Emmy Award-winning producer
- Cher Wang, M.A. 1981 – founder and chairperson of TWSE-listed smartphone manufacturer HTC Corporation and TWSE-listed electronics manufacturer VIA Technologies
- Alice Waters, B.A. 1967 – celebrity chef, founder of Chez Panisse, originator of the California cuisine; 2015 National Humanities Medal recipient for "celebrating the bond between the ethical and the edible. As a chef, author, and advocate, Ms. Waters champions a holistic approach to eating and health and celebrates integrating gardening, cooking, and education, sparking inspiration in a new generation"; member of the American Academy of Arts and Sciences; recipient of five James Beard Foundation Awards (1984 Who's Who of Food & Beverage, 1997 Fruits & Vegetables, 1992 Outstanding Chef, 1992 Outstanding Restaurant, 1997 Humanitarian of the Year, 2004 Lifetime Achievement)
- Norm Winningstad, BSEE 1948 – founder of Lattice Semiconductor and video game peripheral manufacturer Thrustmaster
- Dean Witter, 1909 – co-founder and partner, Morgan Stanley Dean Witter
- Steve Wozniak, class of 1976, graduated B.S. 1986 – co-founder of NASDAQ-100 computer software and hardware manufacturer Apple Inc, member of the National Academy of Engineering; Chief Scientist of flash memory enterprise company Fusion-io (when it was acquired by SanDisk for $1.3 billion); namesake of the Wozniak Lounge in Soda Hall
- Chris Wright – founder and CEO of Liberty Energy, board member of Oklo Inc.
- Tony Xu, B.S. IEOR 2006 – co-founder and CEO of DoorDash

== Chairs, presidents, and CEOs ==
- Charles Anderson, BS Chemistry 1938 – CEO and president (1958–1980) of Stanford Research International (known now as SRI International)
- Mitchell Baker, B.A. 1979, J.D. 1987 – current chairperson and former CEO of the web browser company Mozilla Corporation – current chairperson of the Mozilla Foundation, recipient of the Electronic Frontier Foundation Pioneer Award in 2008; inducted into the Internet Hall of Fame
- William F. Ballhaus, Jr., B.S. 1967, M.S. 1968, PhD 1971 – director of NASDAQ company OSI Systems, former president and CEO of Aerospace Corporation, former director of NASA's Ames Research Center
- Brian Barish, B.A. 1991 – president of the investment firm Cambiar Investors, LLC.
- Bengt Baron, B.S. 1985, M.B.A. 1988 – CEO of V&S Group (Stockholm, Sweden); former CEO of Absolut Vodka; 1980 Summer Olympics gold medalist in 100m men's backstroke
- Stephen Bechtel Sr., attended, honorary – president, chairman of Bechtel Corporation
- Philip M. Condit, B.S. 1963 – chairman and CEO of NYSE-listed S&P 500 aerospace corporation The Boeing Company 1996–2003
- Rick Cronk, B.S. Business 1965 – co-owner and former president (1977–2003) of NASDAQ-listed ice cream company Dreyer's Grand Ice Cream (acquired by Nestlé in a $2.8 billion deal in 2002); former national president of the Boy Scouts of America and the outgoing chairman of the World Scout Committee of the World Organization of the Scout Movement
- Lisa Davis, B.S. – chair and CEO of Siemens Corporation (USA)
- Patricia Dunn, B.A. 1975 – former chairwoman of NYSE-listed S&P 500 computer products company Hewlett-Packard
- Frederick L. Ehrman, 1927 – president, CEO and chair of Lehman Brothers
- Michael R. Gallagher, B.A. Business 1967, MBA 1968 – former CEO and director of Playtex Products, Inc., 1995–2004
- Charles Giancarlo, M.S. – chair and CEO of Pure Storage; former CTO of Cisco and managing director and operating partner of Silver Lake Partners
- Mandy Ginsberg, BA – CEO of Internet dating site Match.com (NASDAQ-listed IAC-subsidiary), CEO of instructional web site Tutor.com (subsidiary of NASDAQ-listed IAC)
- Greg Greeley, MBA 1998 – president of Homes of Airbnb; former vice president of Amazon Prime
- Andrew Grove, PhD 1963 – 4th employee of NASDAQ-100 semiconductor company Intel, and eventually its president, CEO, and chairman, and TIME magazine's Man of the Year in 1997
- Peter E. Haas, B.A. 1940 – president and CEO (1976–2005) and chairman (1981–1989) of Levi Strauss & Co
- Robert D. Haas, B.A. 1964 – chair emeritus and former president, chair, CEO of Levi Strauss & Co.
- Walter A. Haas, Sr., B.S. 1910 – former president and CEO of Levi Strauss & Co.
- Walter A. Haas, Jr., B.S. 1937 – former president and CEO of Levi Strauss & Co.
- H. Robert Heller, PhD Economics 1965 – president and CEO of Visa USA and Federal Reserve Board of Governors
- Isaias W. Hellman Jr., B.A. 1892 – former president of Wells Fargo Bank and the Union Trust Company
- Paul E. Jacobs, B.S. 1984, M.S. 1986, PhD 1989 – CEO of NASDAQ-100 wireless telecommunications semiconductor company Qualcomm
- Daniel E. Koshland Sr., B.A. Economics – CEO (1955–58) of Levi Strauss & Co.
- Joseph Jimenez, M.B.A. 1984 – CEO of Novartis
- Douglas Leeds, B.A. Political Economy – CEO of Ask.com (subsidiary of NASDAQ-listed IAC)
- Howard Lincoln, B.A. 1962, J.D. 1965 – former chairman of video game company Nintendo of America (American branch of TYO-listed video game company Nintendo), chairman and CEO of the Seattle Mariners; recipient of the inaugural Academy of Interactive Arts and Sciences Lifetime Achievement Award
- Sanjay Mehrotra, B.S., M.S. – president and CEO of NASDAQ-100 company Micron Technology
- Shantanu Narayen, M.B.A. 1993 – president and CEO of NASDAQ-100 software company Adobe Systems Inc.
- Paul Otellini, M.B.A. 1974 – CEO of NASDAQ-100 semiconductor company Intel (2005–present)
- Rudolph A. Peterson, B.S. 1925 – president and CEO of NYSE-listed S&P 500 financial services company Bank of America
- John Riccitiello, B.S. 1981 – CEO of NASDAQ-100 video game company Electronic Arts (April 2007 – March 2013); managing director and co-founder of Elevation Partners; former president and chief operating officer (October 1997 to April 2004) of Electronic Arts (grew the company from $673 million to $3 billion, increased profits over 900%); former president and chief executive officer, Bakery Division, at Sara Lee; former president and chief executive officer of Wilson Sporting Goods
- Arun Sarin, M.S. 1978, M.B.A. 1978 – CEO of London-based NASDAQ-100 wireless service provider company Vodafone (2003–present)
- Eric Schmidt, M.S. 1979, PhD 1982 – inaugural CEO of NASDAQ-100 Internet search company Google (2001–2011); executive chairman at Google (2011–present), 136th-richest person in the world in 2011
- Weijian Shan, PhD – chairman and CEO of global investment firm PAG (2022 AUM of $50 billion)
- Jeff Shell, BAS Economics and Applied Math – chairman of Universal Filmed Entertainment and chairman of the Broadcasting Board of Governors
- Douglas W. Shorenstein, BA – real estate developer, chairman and CEO of Shorenstein Properties; chairman of the board of directors of the Federal Reserve Bank of San Francisco
- Masayoshi Son, B.A. 1980 – president and CEO of Japanese multinational corporation Softbank
- Ron Suber, B.A. – president emeritus of Prosper Marketplace
- Robert Tjian, BS Biochemistry – molecular biologist, president of the Howard Hughes Medical Institute
- Cher Wang, M.A. 1981 – chair of computer motherboard manufacturer TWSE-listed VIA Technologies and TWSE-listed portable electronics manufacturer HTC Corporation
- Peng Zhao, Ph.D. 2006 – CEO of Citadel Securities

== Other executives and board members ==
- E. Floyd Kvamme, B.S. EECS 1959 – former vice president and president at NYSE-listed S&P 500 semiconductor manufacturer company National Semiconductor, former vice president at Apple Computer, venture capitalist Kleiner Perkins Caufield & Byers
- Bob Lutz, B.S. 1961, M.B.A. 1962 – General Motors vice chairman, Product Development, and chairman; former vice chairman for Chrysler
- Jack McCauley, BS EECS 1986 – engineer who designed devices used in the video game series Guitar Hero; former vice president of Engineering at Oculus VR)
- Jessica Uhl, B.A. – member of the board of directors of Goldman Sachs, former chief financial officer and a member of the board of directors of Shell plc

== Other ==
- Stewart Blusson, PhD 1964 – multimillionaire diamond magnate (Ekati Diamond Mine)
- Louie DeDeaux, B.A. Sociology (early 1980s) – American combat engineer and narcotics trafficker based in Colombia.
- Don Graham – developer of the Ala Moana Center
- William Randolph Hearst, Jr. (attended) – newspaper publisher
- Michael Milken, B.S. 1968 – billionaire financier, Drexel Burnham Lambert, philanthropist
- Tracey Panek – historian and archivist

== See also ==
- List of UC Berkeley faculty
- List of University of California, Berkeley alumni
- University of California, Berkeley School of Law
