= Sim Van der Ryn =

American architect (1935–2024)

Sim van der Ryn
- Born: Simon Herman Van der Rijn; March 12, 1935; Groningen, Netherlands
- Died: October 19, 2024 (aged 89); Petaluma, California, U.S.
- Education: University of Michigan (B.Arch)
- Occupations: Architect; academic
- Spouses: Mimi Wolfe (divorced); Ruth Friend (divorced); Gale Parker (divorced)
- Children: 3

Simon Herman Van der Ryn (né Van der Rijn; March 12, 1935 – October 19, 2024) was a Dutch-born American architect, researcher, and educator. Van der Ryn's professional interest was applying principles of physical and social ecology to architecture and environmental design. He promoted sustainable design at the community scale and the building-specific scale. He designed single-family and multifamily housing, community facilities, retreat centers and resorts, learning facilities, and office and commercial buildings.

== Biography ==
=== Early life ===
Simon Herman Van der Rijn was born to a Jewish family in Groningen, Netherlands, on March 12, 1935. His family soon fled to the United States, leaving the Netherlands on September 1, 1939, as the Nazi invasion of Poland began. The family first arrived in Queens, New York City, then moved to nearby Great Neck, where they changed the spelling of their surname to Van der Ryn.

Van der Ryn pursued architecture at the University of Michigan, graduating at 24 with a B.Arch in 1958. During that year, he moved to California and joined the UC Berkeley faculty, where he taught for 35 years. Later in his career, he was listed as a state architect in California and New Mexico. Sim also became a licensed architect, where he received a certification by the National Council of Architectural Registration Boards (NCARB).

=== Teaching Career ===
Van der Ryn's professional career was centered around the inclusion of ecological values in the built environment. He taught at the University of California, Berkeley (UC Berkeley) from 1961 to 1995, taking four years off from teaching to work as State Architect for the California state government.

While teaching, Van der Ryn led several projects and design studios that reflected his architectural philosophy. As young Berkeley professors, Van der Ryn and Jim Campe started a program that used a retired post office van to travel to local elementary schools, where they ran workshops and architectural interventions that engaged children with basic design and hands-on making skills. They often used recycled materials, promoting both an anti-consumerist and environmentalist approach. Part of the project took the form of a series of self-published books titled Farallones Scrapbook, which documented their interventions and recommendations for classroom reform.

Van der Ryn and Campe also organized a UC Berkeley studio titled "Making a Place in the Country – The Outlaw Builder's Studio" to engage students directly with the practice and challenges that come with self-sufficient communities. The studio class met three consecutive days a week at a rural plot of land in West Marin County next to the Point Reyes National Seashore, where they learned to forage for food and build structures that the students lived in during the class. The class required an equal number of men and women, an uncommon requirement at the time. The studio used found materials from local buildings that were being demolished and built with them, often ignoring established modern practices and building codes.

In 1972, he was a founding member of the Farallones Institute, a group of ecologically and sustainably minded architects, engineers, and biologists in the Bay Area. In 1974, the group purchased a house in Berkeley, California, which was converted into an experimental urban homestead known as the Integral Urban House. In 1975, the Farallones Institute purchased land in Occidental, California, as an outdoor laboratory for researching environmentally conscious art and design. As of 2026, the same land is owned and operated by the Occidental Arts and Ecology Center.

While Sim Van Der Ryn spent a large majority of his time teaching he brought many of his values into his professional work. One of these being his project the Real Goods Solar Living Center, in Hopland, California. This project was designed for Real Goods Trading company incorporated energy efficient and climate responsive design features. The showroom is built using 600 rice straw bales which were covered with "gun earth" and other local non toxic recycled materials. Because of the sloped roof which contains clerestory windows, natural light is brought into the space without causing glare or overheating. If artificial lighting is needed, the on site grid energy system can be used as a supply source. Because of this additional electric supply source, a solar powered pump allows one million gallons of recycled water throughout the site. This water would be used for irrigation, cooling systems and plumbing uses throughout the project In all, this project encompasses many of Sim Van De Ryn’s philosophies of architecture.

Another project of Sim Van Der Ryn is the Somerset Parkside in Sacramento, California. This community project was designed to revitalize a neighborhood in downtown Sacramento that consisted of mixed use, mixed income, and self sufficient community. Each of the 107 dwellings has a private yard and south facing balcony with year round solar access allowing for little reliance on artificial lighting. This is done to allow for the use of passive solar heating and cooling. With the project being centrally located, there is a reduction in the need for private transportation which decreased general costs for residents. Materials selection played a large part in this project both for user health and affordability. The Somerset parkside became known for its affordability, commercial spaces, shared gardens, and recreational spaces while still maintaining the general focus of the project on the residents of Somerset Parkside.

==== Teaching Appointments ====
- Assistant Professor, University of California, Berkeley (UCB), 1958–1966
- Associate Professor, University of California, Berkeley, 1966-1970
- Professor, University of California, Berkeley, 1970
- Goff Chair of Innovative Architecture, University of Oklahoma, Norman, 2001
- Professor Emeritus of Architecture, University of California, Berkeley, 2019

=== California State Government ===
Van der Ryn was appointed California State Architect in the administration of Governor Jerry Brown in the late 1970s. While working as State Architect, Van der Ryn helped to establish the Office of Appropriate Technology. This new office supported statewide recommendations and implementation of cost- and energy-saving technologies in sectors such as waste disposal, transportation, agriculture, energy, and construction.

=== Personal life and death ===
Van der Ryn was married to Mimi Wolfe, with whom he had three children: Julia, Micah, and Ethan. Their marriage ended in divorce, as did other marriages to Ruth Friend and Gale Parker. Beyond architecture, he had a passion for watercolor painting.

Van der Ryn died from Alzheimer's disease at a care facility in Petaluma, California, on October 19, 2024, at the age of 89.

== Buildings ==
- State of California, Energy Resources and Conservation and Development Building, Sacramento
- State of California, Department of Justice, Office Building #1, Sacramento, 1977-1978
- State of California, State Office Building, Sacramento, 1977-1978
- State of California, Water Resources Control Board Building, Sacramento
- State of California, State Office Building, San Jose
- The Ojai Foundation School, Ojai, California
- Green Gulch Zen Center, Muir Beach, California
- Real Goods Solar Living Center, Hopland, California, 1996

== Awards ==
- Recipient, Guggenheim Fellowship, 1971.
- Recipient, American Institute of Architects, California Council (AIACC), Commendation for Excellence in Technology, 1981.
- Recipient, AIACC, Nathaniel Owings Award, 1996.
- Recipient, Rockefeller Scholar in Residence, Bellagio, Italy, 1997 and 2012.
- Fellowship, Graham Foundation for Advanced Studies in the Fine Arts, Chicago, IL, 1997.
- President's Award for Planning, American Society of Landscape Architects (ASLA Colorado Chapter) for the Arbolera de Vida Master Plan, Albuquerque, NM, 1997.
- Recipient, Congress for the New Urbanism, Athena Medal, 2008

== Books ==
- Van der Ryn, Sim (1978). The Toilet Papers. Santa Barbara, CA: Capra Press. ISBN 978-0884961215
- Van der Ryn, Sim and the Farallones Institute, Helga & William Olkowski (1982). The Integral Urban House. NY: Random House. ISBN 978-0871562135
- Calthorpe, Peter and Sim Van der Ryn (1986). Sustainable Communities: A New Design Synthesis for Cities, Suburbs and Towns. San Francisco: Sierra Club Books. ISBN 0-87156-629-X
- Van der Ryn, Sim and Stuart Cowan (1996). Ecological Design. Washington, DC: Island Press. ISBN 1-55963-389-1
- Van der Ryn, Sim (2005). Design For Life: The Architecture of Sim Van der Ryn. Layton, UT: Gibbs Smith. ISBN 978-1586855307
- Van der Ryn, Sim and Stuart Cowan (2007). Ecological Design, Tenth Anniversary Edition. Washington, DC: Island Press. ISBN 978-1-59726-1418
- Van der Ryn, Sim (2013). Design for an Empathic World: Reconnecting People, Nature, and Self 2nd None ed. Edition. ISBN 978-1610914260
- Van der Ryn, Sim (2013). Culture, Architecture and Nature: An Ecological Design Retrospective 1st Edition. ISBN 041583967X

== See also ==
- Paolo Soleri
- Mike Reynolds
- Tom Bender
