= Strong tie =

Strong tie may refer to:

- Simpson Strong Tie, a subsidiary and brand of structural hardware produced by the Simpson Manufacturing Company
- Interpersonal ties, in sociology
