= Warthen =

Warthen is a surname. Notable people with the surname include:

- Dan Warthen (born 1952), American former baseball player and current coach
- David Warthen (born 1957), American technology company founder
- Ferol Sibley Warthen (1890–1986), American painter and printmaker

== See also ==
- Warthen, Georgia
