= Real Goods Solar =

Real Goods Solar, Inc.
- Type: Public
- Traded as: OTCQX: RGSE
- Genre: Residential and commercial solar PV installation
- Founded: 1978; 48 years ago Willits, California, U.S.
- Founder: John Schaeffer
- Defunct: January 31, 2020 RGS Energy filed for bankruptcy on January 31, 2020 and no longer exists.
- Headquarters: 110 16th Street; Denver, Colorado, U.S.
- Key people: Chief Executive Officer; Dennis Lacey
- Products: Renewable energy systems
- Website: RealGoodsSolar.com; RGSEnergy.com

Real Goods Solar Inc. OTCQX: RGSE was a publicly traded residential solar power integrator doing business as RGS Energy. The company established its roots as a provider of sustainable lifestyle products through its retail division, dating back to 1978, when it sold some of the first retail solar panels in the United States of America. The company had customers in all 50 American states and all 10 Canadian provinces but filed Chapter 7 bankruptcy in January 2020.

== History of Real Goods ==
=== Early years ===
In 1977, 29-year-old John Schaeffer lived on an off-grid community in Mendocino County, California, and commuted 35 miles (56 km) to work each day as a computer operator. As one of the few people with a vehicle and a job in town, he became the designated person to pick up supplies for the community. This led him to create his own general store that sold all the goods for off-grid living at fair prices, according to him. In 1978, Schaeffer took $3,000 in savings and a $5,000 loan from his father and purchased a 50% share of an alternative energy store Open Circle from Steve Troy in Willits, California. John Schaeffer and Steve Troy then changed the name of Open Circle to Real Goods Trading Company.

One day, a man from Los Angeles arrived at the store with a Porsche full of solar panels. First developed at Bell Laboratories in the 1950s and used in the 1960s in the NASA space program, solar panels had yet to find commercial applications. They bought 100 of these novel 9-Watt panels for $600 apiece. They sold them for $900 each to people interested in simple living in Mendocino County who also wanted to enjoy light fixtures, TV and a few of mainstream civilization's other creature comforts. These sales made Real Goods one of the first companies to sell a solar panel commercially in the United States. The success of the Willits store prompted them to open an additional store in Ukiah, California, in 1980 and a third store in Santa Rosa, California in 1982. That same year, Real Goods published the first edition of The Alternative Energy Source Book, which was written by Steve Troy as a source for sustainable living principles and practices.

By 1985, Real Goods' annual sales were $3 million, but growth was erratic, and all three retail stores were closed. Steve Troy left Real Goods and focused his company Jade Mountain (founded in 1979) on technology and renewable energy systems. He sold half of that business in 1999 to Gaiam and worked on creating Gaiam Energy Tech which became Real Goods Solar after he sold the second half of Jade Mountain to Gaiam in 2001. John Schaeffer invested his last $3,000 in a 16-page catalog and rejuvenated the company as a mail order business operating out of his garage, sending catalogs to the 2,000-name mailing list the company had accumulated. Customers returned and the company was revived.

=== The 1990s ===
During the 1990s, Real Goods expanded its business by presenting a message about the benefits of solar energy. https://realgoods.com/off-grid-solar. In 1990, the entire solar industry received a boost from the 20th anniversary of Earth Day and the Persian Gulf War, and Real Goods took advantage of it. That year, the company also set its Billion Pound Goal to keep one billion pounds of carbon dioxide out of the atmosphere by 2000, which it completed three years early in 1997.

In 1991, Real Goods held its first direct public stock offering, selling stock directly to its customers, and raised $1 million. The following year Real Goods declared a National Off-The-Grid Day, which soon became the National Tour of Solar Homes, during which the public could see solar-powered living firsthand. Real Goods held its second stock offering in 1993, and in 1994, used those funds to break ground on the Solar Living Center (SLC) in Hopland, California. The same year, Real Goods launched its e-commerce business. In 1998, Schaeffer formed the Solar Living Institute (SLI), a nonprofit organization whose mission is to promote sustainable living through "inspirational" environmental education. The SLI offers classes and workshops and manages the SLC.

=== Partnership with Gaiam and the birth of Real Goods Solar ===
Real Goods grew significantly in the first decade of the 21st century. By this time, the company had five brick and mortar stores located in Hopland, Santa Rosa, Los Gatos, Berkeley and West Los Angeles, California. The company's catalog and e-commerce businesses grew as well, and Real Goods increased its annual revenues to $19 million.

In 2001, Real Goods merged with the sustainable lifestyle company Gaiam Inc. (Nasdaq: GAIA) in a stock swap worth $8.7 million. Per the merger agreement, Real Goods shareholders received one share of Class A GAIA common stock for each 10 shares of Real Goods stock owned. Gaiam consolidated order processing and distribution in Cincinnati and accounting responsibilities in Broomfield, Colorado, and implemented a new supply chain management information system.

With the influx of additional capital and the power of Gaiam behind it, Real Goods looked for a promising growth opportunity and found it in the residential solar installation market. Since Real Goods was now headquartered in Colorado, yet maintained the SLC, SLI and offices in California, and since the federal government and both states offered attractive tax incentives for installing solar systems, Real Goods opened its residential solar system installation division in both states in 2002. The commercial solar business was also growing, and Real Goods launched its commercial solar installation division in 2004.

=== Initial public offering ===
In 2008, Real Goods positioned itself for aggressive growth by separating its mail order division from Gaiam, re-launching the Real Goods website as a stand-alone e-commerce channel, expanding its solar division, and going public. On May 8, 2008, Real Goods completed an initial public offering as Real Goods Solar and raised $55 million. Real Goods Solar began trading on the NASDAQ under the symbol RSOL. Through holding 100 percent of Real Goods’ Class B shares, Gaiam maintained control of Real Goods.

=== Solar installation expansion ===
Between 2007 and 2008 Real Goods acquired four solar installation companies in California and became one of the nation's largest solar installers. In November 2007, Real Goods Solar acquired San Rafael, California-based Marin Solar for $3.2 million in cash and stock. In a similar deal inked in January 2008, RSOL purchased Carlson Solar, headquartered in Hemet, California for $3.2 million in cash and stock. In August 2008, Real Goods Solar completed its third acquisition — Santa Cruz, California-based Independent Energy Systems for $3.6 million. In October 2008, RSOL completed its fourth acquisition in less than a year by acquiring Regrid Power of Campbell, California in a deal valued at $3.8 million in cash and stock. With the acquisition of Marin Solar, Real Goods added the commercial experience and expertise necessary to position itself as a major competitor in the commercial solar installation market.

=== Merger with Alteris Renewables ===
On June 22, 2011, Real Goods Solar announced a merger agreement with Connecticut-based renewable energy installer Earth Friendly Energy Group Holdings, LLC, d/b/a Alteris Renewables. The merger was completed on December 20, 2011, and the combined company retained the Real Goods Solar name, NASDAQ ticker (RSOL), and Louisville, Colorado headquarters. Alteris equity holders were issued 8.7 million shares of Real Goods Solar Class A common stock in exchange for 100% of Alteris' outstanding equity.

The merger was seen by both companies as an opportunity to increase its national footprint, as Real Goods Solar operated in the West and Alteris operated in the Northeast. The companies' respective regions were considered the two fastest-growing markets for solar installations, and both companies had more than 30 years of experience operating in them.

RGS Energy filed for bankruptcy on January 31, 2020.

== Divisions ==
=== Real Goods Solar division ===
RGS Energy filed for bankruptcy on January 31, 2020, and no longer exists. Their customers have been provided with no referral for maintenance or other issues. Some customers are being pursued by collections agencies for either false claims or contractual obligations of RGS Energy that the company mishandled.

=== Real Goods retail division ===
In 2014 the Hopland store and the Real Goods Retail Division or Real Goods Trading Corporation, were purchased back from RGSE by owner and founder John Schaeffer to be run privately.

=== Solar Living Center ===
The SLI and the Real Goods Store are both headquartered at the Solar Living Center (SLC), a 5,000-square-foot (460 m^{2}) strawbale building surrounded by 12 acres (49,000 m^{2}) of permaculture gardens in Hopland, California. The building was designed using passive solar principles and requires little additional heat or light, and the gardens are laid out in a pattern similar to that of U.S. climate zones.

=== Company headquarters ===
In 2008, Real Goods — with Gaiam as its majority shareholder — moved into new corporate offices in Louisville, Colorado.
