= Barclay Simpson =

American businessman (1937–2022)

- Born: Walter Barclay Simpson; May 25, 1921; Oakland, California, U.S.
- Died: November 8, 2014 (aged 93)
- Education: University of California, Berkeley
- Occupations: Manufacturing, philanthropist
- Spouse(s): Joan Devine (divorce); Sharon Hanley
- Children: 7

Walter Barclay "Barc" Simpson (May 25, 1921 - November 8, 2014) was an American businessman and philanthropist. He was the founder of Simpson Manufacturing, and a major donor to his alma mater, University of California, Berkeley.

== Early life and education ==
Barclay Simpson was born and raised in Oakland, California. During World War II, he was a student at the University of California, Berkeley. He later received his B.S. degree in 1966.

== Career ==
After leaving college, Simpson served in the U.S. Army Air Corps.

In 1956, Simpson founded the engineering firm Simpson Manufacturing. The company developed and produced structural connectors that became an industry standard in housing and commercial construction.

From 1980 to 1993, Simpson and his wife, Sharon, owned and operated an art gallery in Lafayette, California.

== Community ==
Simpson served as president of the BART Board of Directors. He donated to several arts organizations and programs, including Cal Shakes and the Oakland Museum of California.

In 2013, he was awarded the Berkeley Medal for his financial support of the university, including endowing The Simpson Center for Student-Athlete High Performance.
