= Louie DeDeaux =

American combat engineer and narcotics trafficker

- DeDeaux photographed during the Tet Offensive in 1968
- Born: July 3, 1947; Bogotá, Colombia
- Died: January 15, 2026 (aged 78); Near Cali, Colombia
- Education: University of California, Berkeley
- Occupations: Combat engineer; narcotics trafficker
- Known for: Cocaine trafficking and association with The Fraternity

Louie DeDeaux was an American combat engineer and narcotics trafficker associated with the cocaine trade between Colombia and the United States during the 1970s. He attended the University of California, Berkeley and was convicted of felony cocaine possession in California in 1973. As a condition of probation, a judge ordered him to leave the United States.

DeDeaux was identified in Phil Bronstein's 1982 San Francisco Examiner investigation, The Cocaine Fraternity, as an early Colombian cocaine supplier to Stephen Jay Green, a central figure in the California-based trafficking network known as The Fraternity.

== Early life and education ==
DeDeaux was born in Bogotá, Colombia, to an American mining engineer and a Colombian mother. His childhood included periods in Colombia, Bolivia, Peru and California.

He attended Colegio Calasanz in Bogotá and Saint Mary's College High School in the San Francisco Bay Area.

Following his military service, DeDeaux attended the University of California, Berkeley, where he studied sociology. An October 1973 newspaper report identified him as a senior at the university and a Colombian citizen who had lived in the United States for 13 years.

== Military service ==
=== Training and qualifications ===
Louie DeDeaux served in the United States Army from 1967 to 1969. He completed basic combat training at Fort Bragg, North Carolina, before attending combat engineer training at Fort Leonard Wood, Missouri.

At Fort Leonard Wood, DeDeaux underwent military occupational specialty (MOS) training in combat engineering. The eight-week engineer specialist curriculum in use at the installation in September 1967 included bridge construction, military demolitions, mine warfare, field fortifications and the operation of engineering equipment.

His training followed the Army's contemporary combat-engineer program, which emphasized the rapid construction of floating, Bailey and timber bridges; the placement, detection and clearance of land mines; and the use of explosives and demolition equipment. The curriculum also included weapons familiarization with the M16 rifle, M60 machine gun, M79 grenade launcher and M72 LAW antitank weapon.

DeDeaux qualified as a marksman with the M14 rifle and M16 rifle, receiving the Army's Marksman Marksmanship Qualification Badge with Rifle and Automatic Rifle qualification clasps.

=== Combat service in Vietnam ===
Following his training, DeDeaux deployed to South Vietnam, serving with the 19th Combat Engineer Battalion during two combat tours between 1967 and 1969.

His combat service included the Tet Offensive of 1968 and the Battle of Tam Quan.

DeDeaux received the National Defense Service Medal, the Vietnam Service Medal with two bronze service stars, and the Republic of Vietnam Campaign Medal with the 1960– device.

He was honorably discharged from the United States Army as a Specialist Four (E-4).

== Military awards and decorations ==
DeDeaux's military decorations and qualifications included the following:

Military awards and qualifications
Service ribbons
National Defense Service Medal	Vietnam Service Medal with two bronze service stars	Republic of Vietnam Campaign Medal with 1960– device
Marksmanship qualifications
U.S. Army Marksman Marksmanship Qualification Badge with Rifle and Automatic Rifle qualification clasps

== 1972 arrest and conviction ==
On March 20, 1972, DeDeaux was arrested at a residence on Hearst Street in Berkeley following a federal customs investigation.

According to the San Francisco Examiner, customs agents intercepted a newspaper mailed from Colombia to the residence and discovered cocaine concealed inside it. A subsequent search uncovered additional cocaine, bringing the total seizure to approximately 25 grams, valued at $4,400.

DeDeaux was convicted of felony cocaine possession. On October 16, 1973, Alameda County Superior Court Judge Harold B. Hove ordered DeDeaux to leave the United States as a condition of probation. The judge acknowledged that he lacked authority to order deportation but could impose departure as a probation condition.

DeDeaux was fined $500 and agreed to return to Colombia rather than face a possible prison sentence of two to ten years.

== Early activities in Cali ==
After leaving California, Louis DeDeaux settled in Cali, Colombia, where he became involved in the cocaine trade and the local nightlife scene. He owned Saint Tropez, a nightclub in downtown Cali that served as a meeting place for early transactions with members of what would later be called the Cocaine Fraternity. DeDeaux was among the earliest Colombian suppliers to Stephen Jay Green, who was then developing a distribution network in Northern California. Green purchased cocaine from DeDeaux before establishing larger supply relationships with Robert Gomez and Enrique “Kiki” Otoya.

DeDeaux also operated an import-export company named Impercol and worked as a bullfighting impresario while maintaining connections with local politicians and business figures. Outside the city he developed a large ranch that American media later described as a citadel, featuring a man-made lake, an aviary, and a swimming pool. He assembled a notable art collection and imported and collected cars from the United States.

In 1973, DeDeaux, Green, and Frankie Dunn gathered at DeDeaux’ nightclub in Colombia. Journalist Phil Bronstein described the encounter in the first installment of his 1982 investigative series, ‘‘The Cocaine Fraternity’’, identifying DeDeaux as a reputed drug dealer and noting Green’s consumption of aguardiente and cocaine at the establishment.

=== Association with The Fraternity ===
DeDeaux was associated with The Fraternity through his cocaine transactions with Stephen J. Green.

The network connected Colombian suppliers with distributors operating primarily in the San Francisco Bay Area. Green's subsequent associates included Robert Gomez and Enrique "Kiki" Otoya.

DeDeaux's dealings with Green formed part of the early history of the network described in Bronstein's The Cocaine Fraternity investigation.

== Residence in Colombia ==
DeDeaux maintained a large estate outside Cali. The residence was described as a citadel containing a man-made lake, swimming pool and aviary.

He also collected art and imported automobiles from the United States.

== Later life and death ==
DeDeaux withdrew from the cocaine trade during the early 2000s and spent his later years living in the mountains outside Cali, Colombia.

He died in his sleep on January 15, 2026.

== Media coverage ==
=== 1973 San Francisco Examiner report ===
On October 17, 1973, the San Francisco Examiner published "UC student ordered to leave U.S.", documenting DeDeaux's cocaine-possession conviction, Berkeley education and the probation condition requiring his departure from the country.

=== 1982 Cocaine Fraternity investigation ===
In November 1982, journalist Phil Bronstein published a five-part investigative series in the San Francisco Examiner entitled The Cocaine Fraternity.

The series examined Stephen J. Green's cocaine distribution network and its connections with Colombian suppliers, including DeDeaux.

== See also ==
- The Fraternity
- Stephen Jay Green
- Cocaine trafficking
- Illegal drug trade in Colombia
- Vietnam War
