= Lime TV =

Defunct American digital television network focused on health and wellness

- Country: United States
- Broadcast area: Nationwide (United States)
- Headquarters: Bluefield, West Virginia, U.S.

Programming
- Language: English
- Picture format: 480i (SDTV)

Ownership
- Owner: Revolution LLC (Steve Case)
- Parent: Revolution Health Group
- Sister channels: Lime Radio (Sirius 114)

History
- Launched: 1999 (as WISDOM Television)
- Closed: February 25, 2007
- Replaced by: Lime.com
- Former names: WISDOM Television (1999–2005)

Links
- Website: lime.com

Lime TV (formerly WISDOM Television) was an American digital cable and satellite television network devoted to healthy living, wellness, and environmental sustainability. Founded in 1999 by William Turner as part of the Wisdom Media Group, the network featured programs on alternative medicine, yoga, meditation, nutrition, and personal growth. It was later acquired in 2005 by AOL co-founder Steve Case through his company Revolution LLC and rebranded as Lime TV. The channel ceased traditional broadcasting in February 2007 and transitioned into an online and satellite radio platform under the Lime brand. In 2007, Lime was acquired by Gaiam, a wellness media company.

== WISDOM Channel ==
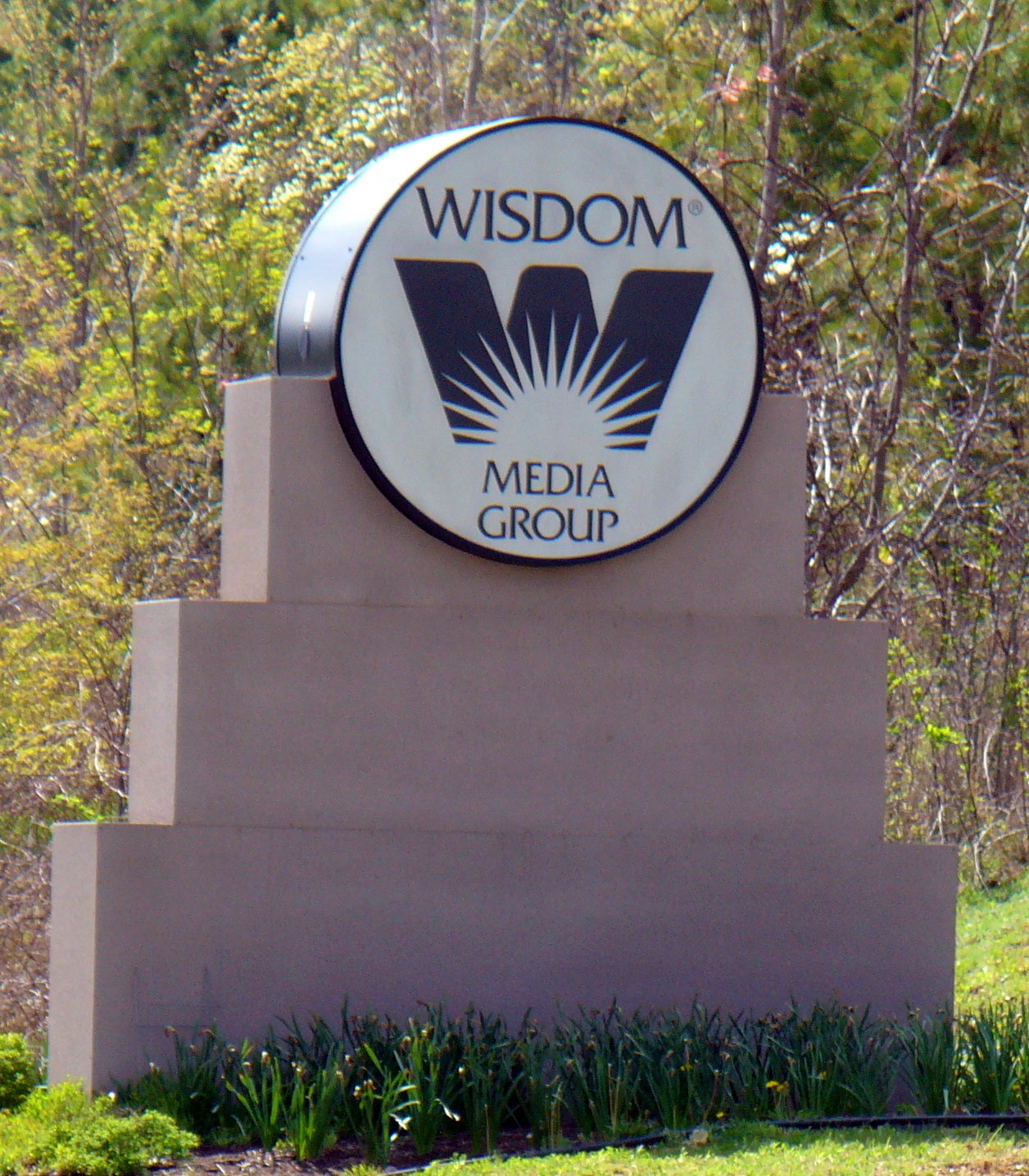
Wisdom Media Group was purchased by Steve Case to become Lime

WISDOM Television and Radio was founded in 1999 by William Turner in Bluefield, West Virginia. Turner (no relation to Ted Turner) was an early entrant into the cable and satellite television business. He was a pioneer of cable television, introducing one of the first cable television systems nationwide in Welch, West Virginia, and then expanded into the C-band service (large dish) business with becoming one of the largest C-band providers nationwide. He then founded Wisdom Television and Wisdom Radio with programming centered on new-age entertainment, alternative medicine, healthy lifestyles, and philosophy.

In 2002, Turner died after a long struggle of cancer, and the family sought out after his mission to sell the company in order to expand the distribution and grow. In 2005, Wisdom Media Group was sold to Steve Case's Revolution company and became LIME TV.

== AOL Acquisition ==
In 2005, the network was acquired by a company led by AOL Co-Founder, Steve Case. The channel was soon renamed and rebranded as Lime TV. The details of Case's acquisition have never been publicly disclosed, but the purchase by Case's company included WISDOM's carriage and distribution contracts with DISH, Comcast, Insight Communications, and Sirius Radio, as well as WISDOM's programming library.

== As Lime TV/Radio ==
Present day Lime TV combined community and editorial content with streamed video and social networking tools. Lime.com included features such as The Meditation Room, eco-celebrity gossip in The Green Room, a news feed and articles, tips, and polls. Lime.com was also the home of a feature called Live the Change that offers simple tips that make big changes for living better. Updated weekly, Lime's podcasts offered nine channels of content covering tips and information from Lime Radio and Lime Television hosts, specifically customized for podcast content. Podcast topics include eco-friendly gardening, fighting stress, parenting skills, and relationship advice.

Lime Radio was a 24/7 channel on Sirius Satellite Radio channel 114. It offered 12 daily hours of live call-in shows. Hosts include Andrew Weil, herbal pharmacist Dave Foreman, supermarket guru Phil Lempert, Jesse Dylan, Neale Donald Walsch, Josh Dorfman ("The Lazy Environmentalist"), Mel Robbins and Karen Salmansohn. The channel has been discontinued on February 13, 2008.

Lime Wireless provided mobile phone information on wellness, sustainability and personal growth. It was available on Sprint and Verizon Wireless via their mobile portal pages.

== End of Service ==
On January 29, 2007, Lime announced they would discontinue the television channel in favor of online content distribution. Both Comcast Cable and Dish Network notified their subscribers that the last day of Lime TV service would be February 25, 2007.

In August 2007, LIME was purchased by GAIAM, a health and wellness company that operates GAIAM.com.
