= Occidental Arts and Ecology Center =

Ecology center

Coordinates: 38.4125°N 122.9564°W

The Occidental Arts & Ecology Center (OAEC) is a non-profit organization and intentional community located near the town of Occidental in the western part of Sonoma County, California, the traditional homeland of the Southern Pomo and Coast Miwok. It is situated on an 80-acre ecological reserve in the Dutch Bill Creek Watershed, near the Russian River. OAEC is a research, demonstration, education, advocacy, and community-organizing center that develops strategies for regional-scale community resilience.

Founded in 1994, OAEC's projects and partnerships address current urgent crises through permaculture and ecological design, biointensive horticulture, conservation hydrology, restoration ecology, strategic organizing methods, and democratic self-governance.

OAEC hosts organizational retreats for networks, public agencies, foundations, and other groups working towards social and environmental change.

OAEC's mission is to support systems of governance and economy that are ecologically restorative, socially just, and culturally rejuvenating. OAEC trains and supports “whole communities” — schools, public agencies, tribes, urban social justice organizations, watershed groups, and others — to design and cultivate resilience to mounting ecological, social, and economic challenges.

== History ==
The land OAEC resides on was developed in 1974 as The Farallones Institute Rural Center, an independent association of scientists, architects, and horticulturists who founded a center for teaching and research in appropriate technology, organic gardening, and sustainable design. The Farallones Institute established the original garden, known as the Mother Garden. In 1982 the Mother Garden became certified organic by CCOF and is currently the 7th oldest garden in California to receive this organic certification. The Mother Garden was also granted the first ever organic agricultural easement in the United States by the Sonoma County Land Trust in 1994, requiring that the Mother Garden remain in organic agricultural production into perpetuity.

In 1994 OAEC was founded by a group of friends as a non-profit and intentional community, the Sowing Circle. Over the years, landmark moments include the beginning of the OAEC Nursery Plant Sale in 1995, which continues seasonally from April to October. OAEC has offered Permaculture Design Certification courses since 1996, making it one of the oldest permaculture institutions in the country. In 2004, the WATER Institute was established to organize communities around Conservation Hydrology for the stewardship, advocacy, and protection of watersheds. In 2009 the Bring Back the Beaver campaign was officially launched to advocate for and educate about the importance of native beavers as a keystone species for healthy watersheds in California. In 2024, OAEC was awarded Non-Profit of the Year for California Senate District 2.

== Programs ==
=== Mother Garden Biodiversity ===
OAEC's Mother Garden Biodiversity Program curates, propagates, and shares thousands of varieties of edible, medicinal, and ornamental plants, with a focus on perennials. The plant collection and seed bank emphasize food crops of special genetic, cultural, and historic importance that are appropriate to the Bay Area bioregion. Each year, the Mother Garden Biodiversity Program hosts three of the largest free seed exchanges in California - Bioneers, the Ecological Farming Association Conference, and the West Sonoma County Seed Swap. The onsite gardens provide a classroom for onsite courses and food for residents and retreat guest throughout the year.

The Mother Garden Nursery is 100% California Certified Organic. Plant sales run every weekend from April - October.

=== WATER Institute ===
In 2004, OAEC established the WATER Institute (Watershed Advocacy, Training, Education & Research) to promote the importance of healthy watersheds to healthy communities. The WATER Institute promotes community-based watershed literacy and action by:

1. Reframing the policy debate around water quality and supply at the city, county, and California state levels.
2. Educating and empowering all sectors of regional economies to implement restoration, conservation, and policy changes for water security for communities, agriculture,. and ecosystems.
3. Implementing climate change responsive land-use and water management practices at the watershed scale.

OAEC demonstrates Conservation Hydrology restoration techniques at the 80-acre demonstration site. From 1997 to 2003, the WATER Institute ran its flagship program, Basins of Relations: Starting and Sustaining Community Watershed Groups, which trained over 40 California watershed groups. Co-founder Brock Dolman coined the now viral watershed restoration meme Slow it, Spread it, Sink it, Store it, Share it, referring to slowing water down and spreading it out onto the landscape so that it has time to rehydrate the water table. These and many other core WATER Institute principles can be found in the Basins of Relations: A Citizen’s Guide to Protecting and Restoring Our Watersheds guidebook.

==== Bring Back the Beaver Campaign ====
In 2009, as a response to the drastic decline of coho salmon in the Russian River watershed, the WATER Institute launched a Bring Back the Beaver Campaign to educate citizens about the importance of beaver for watershed and ecosystem resiliency. North American Beavers are what biologists call a “keystone species” as the habitat they create benefits many other species. Their dams improve water quantity and quality, increase late-season stream flow, and reduce the impacts of flooding. Beaver bank burrows and food caches provide critical habitat for many native and endangered California species. To improve water supply quality and quantity and increase resilience to drought, wildfire, and climate change, the WATER Institute works to integrate beaver management into California policy and regulation.

In 2023, after over a decade of work by the Bring Back the Beaver Campaign, OAEC worked with the California Department of Fish and Wildlife (CDFW) to change state beaver policies to recognize that beaver are a California native species and that they provide ecological benefits in diverse landscapes across the state. At CDFW's request, OAEC is creating a statewide Beaver Coexistence Program to help farmers and other landowners live with and benefit from the presence of beaver in the landscape. Major milestones in this campaign were OAEC's support for moving the State into collaborations with both the Maidu Summit Consortium and the Tule River Tribe in carrying out the first beaver conservation translocations in California in nearly 75 years.

=== Wildlands Restoration ===
OAEC's 70-acre wildlands preserve and field campus honors the legacy of Coast Miwok/Southern Pomo land stewardship practices and seeks to restore keystone ecological cycles of fire, carbon, and life through “regenerative disturbance.” Since 1994, staff, volunteers, and students have been steadily working to restore healthy mixed hardwood and conifer forests, coastal prairie, and riparian plant and animal communities through active stewardship and wildtending methods. Core elements of the wildlands program include the “Fuels to Flows” Campaign, local Fireshed x Watershed Community Organizing, Workforce Development in Holistic Vegetative Management, and Biological Monitoring/Citizen Science.

=== Organizational Retreats ===
OAEC serves as a retreat center for organizations, networks, public agencies, foundations, and others working towards social and environmental change. OAEC has hosted hundreds of groups and tens of thousands of organizers, teachers, land-stewards, tribal members, farmers, policymakers, government agency staff, philanthropists, and advocates from all over California, the U.S., and around the world to plan solutions for pressing ecological and social issues.

=== Fiscally Sponsored Projects ===
OAEC gives administrative support to new social change organizations who don't have or need their own 501(c)(3) nonprofit status by providing accounting, tax, HR, strategy and fundraising support.

== Publications ==
OAEC has produced various publications including Basins of Relations: A Citizen's Guide to Protecting our Watersheds, Beaver in California: Creating a Culture of Stewardship, Russian River Watershed Map, and cookbook.
