= Gary Chevsky =

American computer scientist

- Born: September 11, 1972; Odessa, Ukrainian SSR, Soviet Union (now Ukraine)
- Occupation: Entrepreneur

Gary Chevsky (born September 11, 1972 in Odesa) is an American entrepreneur, engineer and was the founding architect of Ask.com. He served as President at Tango mobile video and audio-over-IP calling service for consumers, before founding a Social Virtual Reality company StayUp Inc.

== Career ==
In 1992, Chevsky was hired by Garrett Gruener, fellow Berkeley grad and eventual co-founder, to help write programming for the Ask Jeeves concept site. After parting ways, he went on to work for Informix before reconnecting with Gruener in 1995. From 1995 to 2006, Chevsky worked on question answering and information-retrieval technologies at Ask Jeeves (now Ask.com). Subsequently, he served as Vice President of Engineering at Symantec Corporation in its Consumer Business Unit (known for its Norton brand), developing web security technologies such as Norton Safe Web. From 2009 to 2011, he served as Vice President of Product Development, Operations & IT for YouSendIt (now Hightail). In July 2011, Chevsky was hired at Tango.me, a video calling company, to oversee engineering. Chevsky went on to become the President of Tango, which during his tenure grew from less than 10 million to over 400 million users worldwide. In 2017, Chevsky envisioned the future of video communication in virtual reality and started an effort at Tango around Social VR, eventually leading the spin-off of the project into a stand-alone company StayUp Inc., with Chevsky as founder and CEO. StayUp was acquired in 2018 by IMVU, a social 3D world company, with Chevsky coming onboard as an executive advisor. In 2021, he joined RingCentral as Vice President of Collaboration.

== Personal life ==
He immigrated to the United States in 1988 and settled in San Francisco, California. Chevsky studied Computer Science at the University of California Berkeley. He holds 5 patents in the area of natural language processing and search/information retrieval, and is also featured in the Search Engine exhibit in the Computer History Museum in Mountain View, CA.
