= Integral Urban House =

1970s California sustainability project

- First edition (publ. Sierra Club Books)
- Author: Bill Olkowski; Helga Olkowski; Sim Van der Ryn
- Set in: Berkeley, California.
- Publication place: United States

The Integral Urban House was a pioneering 1970s experiment in self-reliant urban homesteading. The house was located at 1516 5th St. in Berkeley, California between 1974 and 1984.

The Sierra Club published a book about the experiment in 1979. Elements of the home included a vegetable garden, chickens, rabbits, a fish pond, beehives, a composting toilet, solar power and more. The founders were California State Architect Sim Van der Ryn and Bill & Helga Olkowski, authors of the City People's Guide to Raising Food, and the project was run by the Farallones Institute, which was also founded by Van der Ryn and Bill and Helga Olkowski. According to cofounder Bill Olkowski, Architectural Digest named among the top houses of the 20th century.

According to one environmental history, "The Olkowskis and staff at the Integral Urban House taught visitors to become ecosystem managers in urban, domestic space by involving them in pest control, food production, and household waste management."

== Background and mission ==
In 1972 Sim Van der Ryn, Bill & Helga Olkowski, and other architects, engineers, and biologists in the San Francisco Bay Area held a series of meetings at restaurants ("usually Chinese") to form the Farallones Institute, which was founded as a non-profit research and educational organization focused on studying self-reliant living and developing sustainable environmental practices at an urban scale. Shortly after its founding, the Farallones Institute proceeded with a project to create a house that would be capable of combining, or “integrating”, principles of energy conservation, water conservation, urban agriculture, domestic waste recycling, solar energy collection, home composting, and in-house food growth to create a self-sufficient demonstration house to showcase their ideas to the public. Bill and Helga Olkowski proposed to have this house built in an urban setting as they wanted to show that cities could become, in their words, “ecologically stable and healthy places to live”.

The project's development was further accelerated by the 1973 oil crisis, when imports of oil from the Middle East slowed considerably. In wake of the crisis, the Farallones Institute envisioned a house that could provide its own food and energy in case gasoline, electricity, and natural gas were ever expected to become scarce and unaffordable. The term “integral urban house” was chosen as the name of the project as the institute wanted to provide a house that integrated biological ideas with architectural ones. In order to conserve building materials, promote recycling habits, and to demonstrate that similar projects could be conducted elsewhere at a lower cost, the project’s founders opted to renovate an existing house instead of building a new house from the ground up. According to one report, "The group secured $110,000 from private foundations and institutes for labor and materials to rehabilitate the run-down urban house and fit it with solar energy and non-polluting sanitation and other systems.

Bill Olkowski wrote in 2011, "About 1974 or so Andy Pollack was a student at Antioch College West in San Francisco where we taught, in addition [to teaching] in the Man and Environment Program at UC Berkeley. He was living at our house at that time and found what later became the Integral Urban House by riding his bicycle around Berkeley searching for a place. He found a house for sale in the industrial sector within a zone where one could hear constantly hear the low steady rumble of the freeway in the background. It was being put up for sale (actually a bidding process) for back taxes." According to the Berkeley Revolution, a digital archive of the area's transformation in the late 1960s & 1970s, the Farallones institute purchased a run-down Victorian home in October 1974 in the neighborhood of West Berkeley for less than $10,000 (not adjusted for inflation), with renovation beginning shortly afterwards. By June 1975, the Integral Urban House became open to the public for classes and tours, despite renovations not yet being completed. Other key personnel involved in the project that were credited by Van der Ryn in the introduction to the book published by the Sierra Club included Jim Campe, Jeff Poetsch, and Sheldon Leon, who were responsible for much of the house’s construction, Tom Javits, the resident manager of the house, and Harlow Daugherty, who provided the original grant to begin the project.

Similar projects of the 1970s included Eco-house in London and Project Ouroboros in St. Paul, Minnesota.

== Layout ==
The Integral Urban House was located on a 125 ft (38 m) by 60 ft (18 m) .125-acre (5,400 ft^{2}; 510 m^{2}) lot at 1516 5th St in Berkeley and consisted of two floors which were referred to as the ground floor and the main floor. The front of the house and the driveway faced east while the main entrance of the house was located on the south-facing wall of the ground floor.

The ground floor consisted of two bedrooms, a project office, a reception area with displays of the house's features for visitors to see, a composting tank for tanks for composting human waste and kitchen waste, a tank for greywater collection, a shop room, a greenhouse, and demonstration areas for visitors to see how beekeeping and aquaculture were conducted at the house. The ground floor also had an area to store vegetables and other crops grown at the house as well as an area to dry rabbit hides that were saved to make leather after rabbits in the backyard were consumed for their meat.

The main floor, which was accessible by stairs located near the ground floor entrance, featured a third bedroom, a seminar/office room, a library, a kitchen with a wood gas stove, pantry, and "cold box", a dining area, and the house’s only bathroom, which contained a waterless composting toilet located above the tank on the ground floor. The main floor also had a balcony above the front driveway looking east and a porch with a solar oven and container garden overlooking the backyard in the west.

== Features ==
Helga Olkowski wrote The Self-Guided Tour to the Integral Urban House of the Farallones Institute, Berkeley, California, which was published by the Farallones Institute in 1976. The guide outlines the many unique features of the house which are listed below.

=== Animals ===
One of the most notable features of the Integral Urban House was the amount of animals that were kept outside the house, including bees, fish, crawdads, chickens, and rabbits. The beehives, located in the far southwest corner of the backyard, were raised to produce as much as 50 lb (23 kg) of honey for the house's use, according to Oklowski. The House offered a "bee club" with shared use of a honey extractor and other beekeeping equipment. There was also an observation beehive on the first floor of the house. The beehives were placed above the fish pond so that bees were located away from visitors as much as possible and so that dead worker bees that fell into the pond would feed the fish, which were also raised as a source of food for the house's residents. According to Bill Olkowski, "One of our students designed...an innovative pond with wind-activated aeration producing crayfish on human urine." In order to keep the water in the fishpond from becoming stagnant, a windmill known as the Savonius Rotor was constructed out of recycled oil drums, salvaged lumber, and scrap metal. The windmill activated a mechanical diaphragm pump which pumped stagnant pond water through a felt bag suspended on top of a cut oil drum to filter out large particles. Water entering the drum was filtered once again by a bed of crushed oyster shells before being fed back to the pond through a faucet aerator. The aquaculture species included Sacramento blackfish, rainbow trout, and Pacifasticus crayfish.

Chickens were kept near the northeast corner of the house by the front driveway and raised for their eggs and for meat. Rabbits were raised on the shady side of the house next to the chickens, were fed "commercial pellets, garden-grown alfalfa, and discarded produce," and were raised both for their meat and for tanning their pelts to make leather.

=== Vegetation and crops ===
The front, side, and back yards of the house had a wide variety of plants and fruit trees so that the house could provide a great deal of its overall food for its residents and for the animals. Alfalfa trees were planted in the front yard next to the front driveway as a source of protein for rabbits that were kept in back of the house. According to Bill Olkowski, this was inspired by wartime practices in the area: "Rabbits are the best survival system as they could eat almost anything growing in the urban area...In WWII rabbit growing was big in the San Francisco Bay area as the climate is amenable to alfalfa...I saw reports of over 10 cuttings per year on earlier alfalfa farms." In order to preserve the soil below the driveway and to prevent any stormwater from picking up pollutants before reaching storm drains, the ground surface in front of the house had a wood-chip driveway in lieu of a conventional asphalt, concrete, or brick driveway. The side yard in front of the main entrance along the south-facing wall grew strawberries, asparagus, artichokes, culinary herbs, and rhubarb for the house's residents, as well as chrysanthemums and comfrey to feed to chickens and rabbits. The backyard of the house had a 2,500 ft^{2} (230 m^{2}) vegetable garden which provided a majority of the food that was grown at the house. The garden used raised beds to permit good drainage and to allow visitors and residents to easily walk around the garden on pathways. Oscillating overhead sprinklers watered most of the vegetables, but squashes, corn, and tomatoes were watered with a soaker hose. The house's mini-orchard included avocado, fig, quince, lemon, plum, and apple trees. The vegetable garden provided plentiful vegetation; Oklowski claims that in 1975 it was reported that $600 worth (not adjusted for inflation) of vegetables were produced at the house with little expenses outside of seeds and water.

For cooler winter months, a greenhouse was attached to the southwest corner of the house’s ground floor to raise tomatoes and cucumbers. The greenhouse also doubled as a source of solar heating for inside the house, with insulated curtains provided to retain heat on colder winter nights. In addition to the yards surrounding the house and the greenhouse, a "roof-top garden" on the main floor porch overlooking the backyard had containers filled with compost to grow tea mints and salad greens. In order to store the large amounts of vegetables farmed at the house, a cooler room located near the center of the ground floor was used for vegetable storage and egg storage.

=== Composting ===
In order to sustain the high amounts of food production at the house, kitchen wastes, weeds, plant debris, and animal manure were composted into soil. Olkowski states that a “fast” or “hot” batch method of composting was used, which involved collecting composting materials, such as kitchen waste, animal manure, and other miscellaneous yard debris from the garden. These materials were then placed into a 1 yd^{3} (0.76 m^{3}) yard wooden bin, located near the chickens and rabbits, to create a mixture for decomposing organisms. Sawdust was used to prevent odors. After the composting material was collected, regular turning and moistening of the compost was completed to maintain hot temperatures to kill weed seeds, plant diseases, and insect larvae. The compost material was ready for garden use in about two to four weeks after the composting material had cooled. This was then used to grow vegetables around the house or as a mulch.

In addition to this method of composting, the Integral Urban House used a "Clivus Multrum" waterless toilet in the main floor bathroom with a separate composting tank located on the ground floor below. This tank was fed from both the toilet and from another chute in the nearby kitchen. Materials were gathered in the first of three sections of the tank, beginning to decompose through microbial action with the addition of sawdust, dried weeds, or leaves. In order to prevent odors, a ventilating chimney with a small fan would draw air through the roof and out of the house. Fresh air entered the composting chamber through ducts in its trap door, causing the material to lose 95% of its bulk as carbon dioxide and water vapor, which were vented to the outside. Because of this, the tank was capable of accommodating the wastes of six people for up to two years. At the time the guide to the house was written by Olkowski and published in 1976, composted material from the waterless toilet had not been used yet due to the toilet’s recent installation. The Clivus Multrum was the most expensive single element of the House; it cost $1,600 to purchase and install.

=== Gray water recycling system ===
In order to save the amount of water used for irrigation, the house had pipes installed from the bathroom sink and shower drain on the main floor into a different tank located next to the one for the composting toilet on the ground floor. Through a network of hoses to the garden and by using cloth bags to filter large particles, this gray water would be applied to the soil around trees and crops, although this would only be provided for crops where the portion above the ground was eaten. Wastewater from the kitchen continued to be drained into the sewer instead, due to its concentration of soaps, solid waste, and other chemicals making it inadvisable to use for vegetation.

=== Interior building features ===
The kitchen of the Integral Urban House had a “cold box”, which was a cupboard with vented screen openings at the top and the bottom that was insulated from the rest of the house. The insulation allowed the cupboard to have a much cooler temperature year-round compared to its surroundings, reducing the amount of mechanical refrigeration needed in the kitchen. The bathroom, located adjacent to the kitchen in the northwest corner of the building’s main floor, had a south-facing window which used a passive solar heating system. Jugs of liquid, either painted black or containing a black liquid, would absorb heat from the south-facing sun and radiate this heat at night to the bathroom and the adjacent kitchen and dining area. Manually operable shutters, accessible from the back porch, were installed to ensure that the heat would either not escape during colder nights or not be collected at all during warmer months. The seminar room, which was used for classes and meetings, used an efficient Norwegian wood stove, which according to Olkowski could convert up to 60% of the energy in wood into effective heat, six times that of a normal fireplace.

=== Flytraps & pest management ===
In order to combat the amounts of flies, insects, and other pests that were encountered from food production, composting, and raising animals, fly trap kits were installed and flies were either fed to chickens, fish, or added to the compost pile. Synthetic pesticides were not used in the Integral Urban House, as the house’s founders viewed these as dangerous and as something that ultimately created more problems as insects became more and more resistant to their use. Barriers and traps were implemented, such as dry sawdust barriers between raised beds to discourage snail migration. However, the Integral Urban House still relied on handpicking of pests to feed to animals.

=== Solar oven and solar water heater ===
The porch on the main floor with the “roof-top garden” also contained a solar oven which could heat to 300 °F (149 °C) from 11:30am to 3:30pm on a sunny day when temperatures were around 70 °F (21 °C). Additionally, the Integral House had a 6 ft (1.8 m) by 16 ft (4.9 m) solar-heated hot water system, located on the sloped roof of the main floor on top of the main ground floor entrance. Solar collection panels were placed facing south to capture radiation and heat the hot water used in the house. A tank, which was fed from its bottom from the city's cold water supply, was located in the attic and held all of the water for the house. In order to heat this water, cold water was naturally fed downwards to the base of the solar collector. The water entered the copper piping under the solar collector, picking up heat and naturally rising to the top of the attic storage tank. This process is referred to by Olkowski as a “thermo siphon”. When hot water is desired, the heated water is drawn off from the top of the tank first and automatically mixed with cold water to ensure that temperatures are not too hot for dishwashing or shower use. The solar collector cost about $1,200 to build. For excessive overcast or foggy periods, the house had a 30 U.S. gal (110 L; 25 imp gal) electric water heater as a backup, but this was not often needed; data collected for 1975 stated that this only provided five percent of the hot water needed for that year.

== Daily use ==
The Integral Urban House offered many classes to the public on various topics related to ecological housing, such as solar energy systems, food stock raising, and beekeeping. It also provided training programs, seminars on environmental education, and consultation for others who were looking to make similar modifications to their homes. As a demonstration house available for the public to view, the house proved to be quite popular in its early years – resident manager Tom Javits states in the introduction to the guide written by Oklowski that each week about 500 people visited the house, with 45-minute tours being conducted between 1:00pm and 5:00pm on Saturdays and at 1:00 pm on Mondays, Wednesdays, and Fridays for large groups in excess of five people. Circa 1976, the regular tour guides were Charles O'Loughlin, Tanya Drlik, and Tom Javits.

In the first three years that the house was being renovated, eight other homes in the neighborhood were renovated and occupied as the project gained interest in the local area.

The house was typically occupied by a handful of students from the University of California, Berkeley, employed as interns, who would be responsible for maintaining the house’s systems and documenting successes, failures, and challenges.

According to a U.S. government book published in 1980 for consumers struggling with inflation, "Until all systems were functional the monthly expense of operating the house was $2,000. But by the end of 1979 electricity, gas and water bills for the seven-bedroom house averaged an incredibly low $30 a month."

== Rise and decline in popularity ==
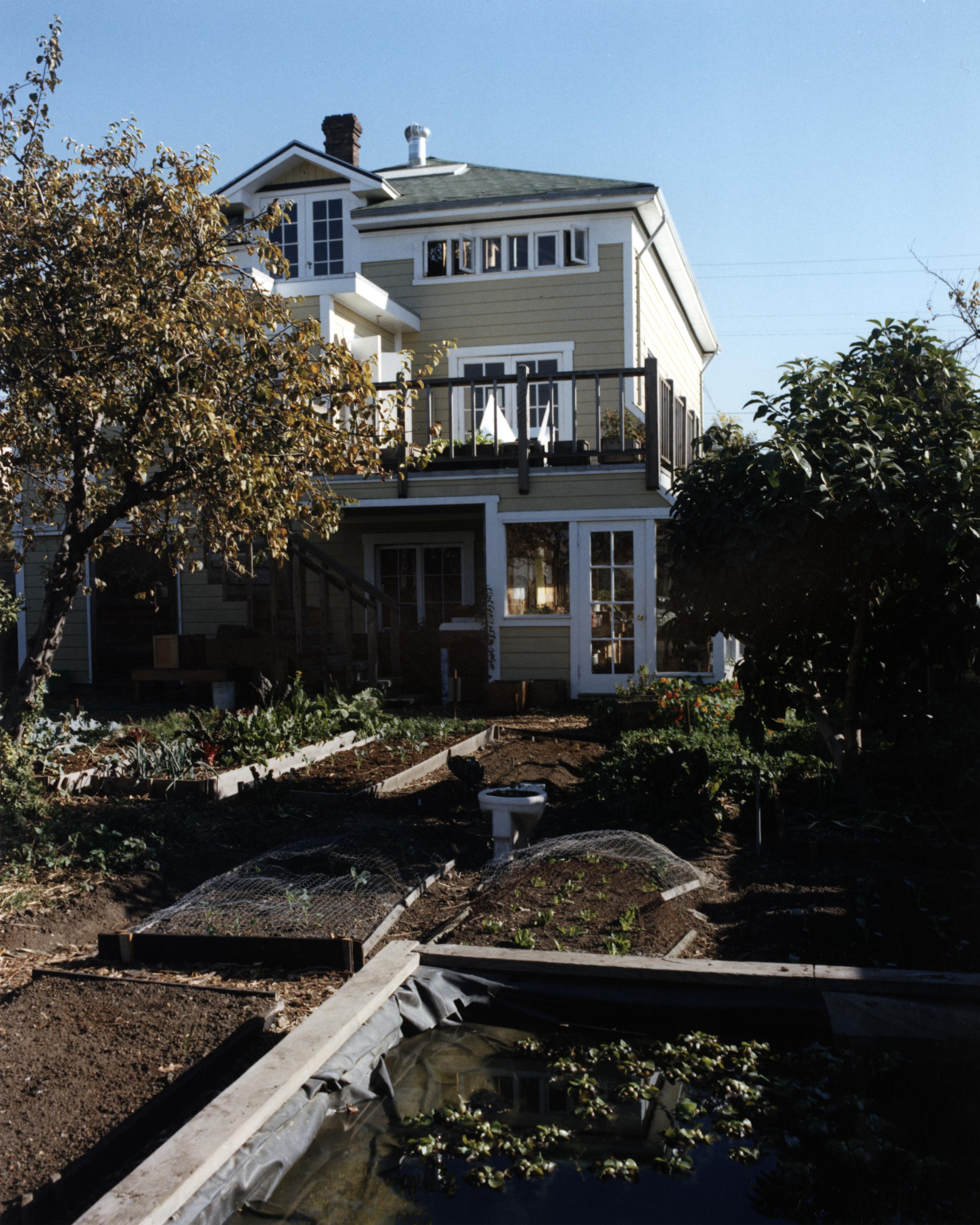
The backyard of the present-day Integral Urban House, taken on June 27, 2014.

In order to spread their ideas, members of the Farallones Institute, including der Ryn and the Olkowskis, wrote a guide that was published by the Sierra Club in 1979 which provided methodologies, design strategies, and other information for its readers to study when considering building similar houses of their own. The book contains chapters devoted to energy conservation, water conservation, waste management, using solar energy, raising plants and animals, and combining these features together. Circa 1980 there were hopeful plans for an Integral Urban Neighborhood.

After a few years, the Integral Urban House became less and less popular in the Bay Area. In order to maintain the extensive range of features of the house, a large amount of labor was needed, which was typically supplied by unpaid students. By the time Sim Van der Ryn had left Berkeley for Sacramento to establish the state’s Office of Appropriate Technology, students became more and more unwilling to provide the heavy and dirty labor required to maintain the house. The house began to suffer from a lack of proper maintenance, leading to the house having low food quality from reduced composting and crop growth.

In addition to difficulty in finding the necessary labor to maintain the house, the neighborhood around the house began to experience widespread gentrification by the early 1980s. Sabrina Richard from the group Critical Sustainabilities, a collection of students promoting sustainable practices in the Bay Area, states that a nearby luxury-shopping destination was constructed and the area increased greatly both in population and in land value. New residents complained about the smells from composting, the disturbance from animals that were still at the house, and the amount of flies that the house naturally attracted. A 2004 article from the San Francisco Chronicle claims that others even stated that the whole building smelled like the composting toilet.

== End of the Integral Urban House ==
By 1984, the Integral Urban House project was permanently suspended, as its creators admitted that it had failed to gain more public support. By the time of its closure, the Integral Urban House was unable to generate sufficient funds from tours and classes. As of 2017, the house has since been converted back to a standard residential home. Despite being transformed into a normal residence, the Integral Urban House still retains much of its exterior appearance from the 1970s.

== Book ==
Bill Olkowski stated of the book, "The first edition was erroneously published as if Sim van der Ryn was the primary author and designer, but he was not. Subsequent editions correctly identify Helga and me as primary authors." Olkowski also stated about the book-editing process:

I wrote the final draft of the book (took about three months of daily work, in between other jobs and teaching) with Helga as always, and with Tom Javits making major contributions, particularly in various designs and drawings. During submission to the publisher, Sierra Club, the chapter on solar energy was deleted and another was substituted without our knowledge. I just found a copy of this chapter in my piles from back then, but it was lost for a long time. Not that the chapter was anything special, but it was focused on how people could maximize solar house heating by such simple means as manipulating existing shades and blinds, for example. Other methods were oriented to how people could do solar projects, ovens, distillations, etc.

Library Journal wrote of the book that "The environmentally minded adult who is anxious to do something will find many clear, practical suggestions through the index of this book with its positive approach to conservation of energy and resources, recycling, solar energy, and food production." The report People power: what communities are doing to counter inflation (1980) recommended it as "a resource guide for the city dweller who wants to develop an economic self-sustaining lifestyle."
