= Dodge & Cox =

American Investment Firm

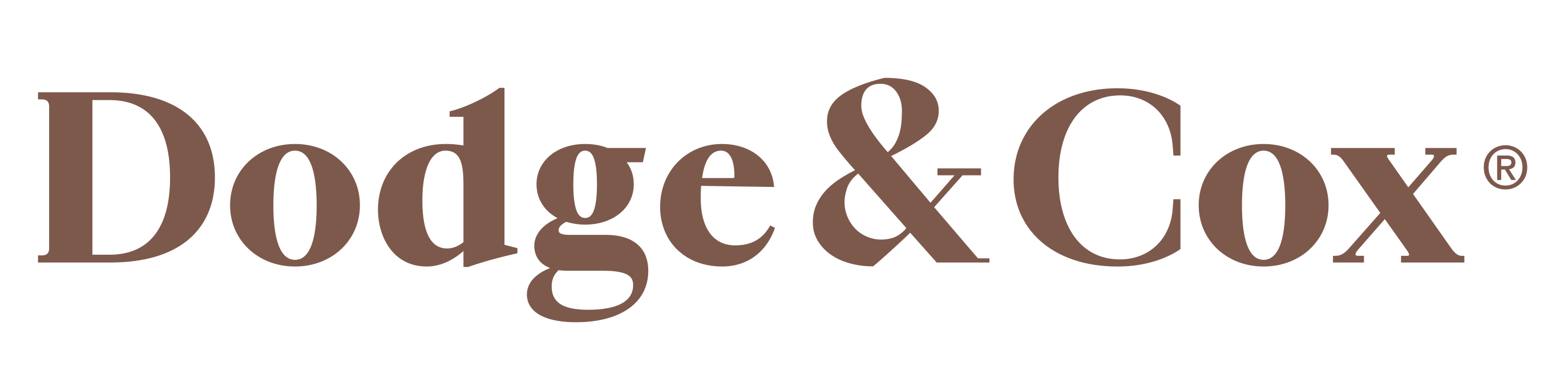

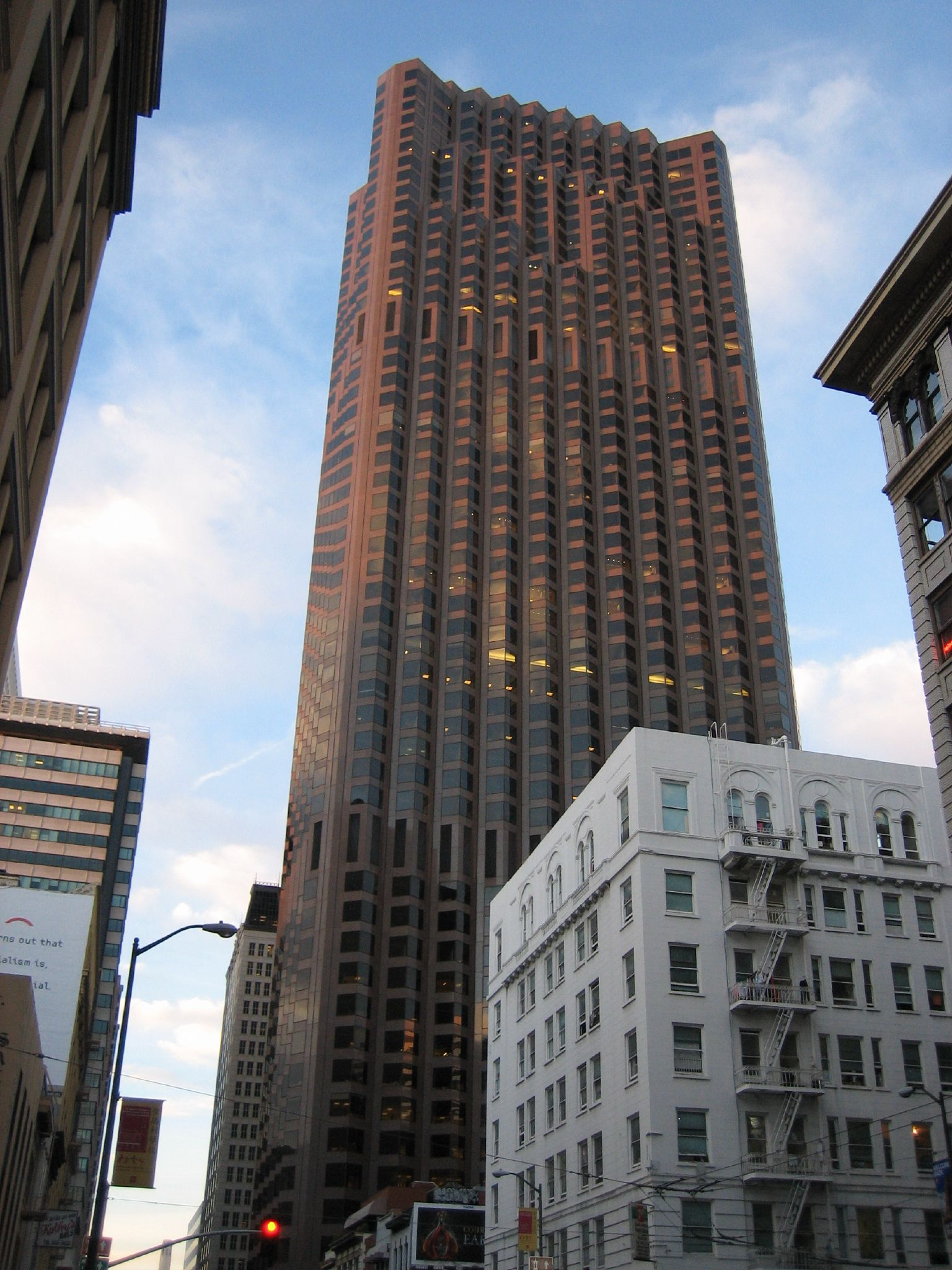
- Headquarters at 555 California Street
- Type: Private
- Industry: Investment Management
- Founded: 1930; 96 years ago
- Headquarters: 555 California Street; San Francisco, California, U.S.
- Key people: David Hoeft (chair & Chief Investment Officer); Roger Kuo (president & CEO)
- AUM: US$466 billion (December 31, 2025); US$400 billion (December 31, 2024); US$363 billion (December 31, 2023); US$323 billion (December 31, 2022)
- Number of employees: 336 (April 2026)
- Website: dodgeandcox.com

Dodge & Cox is a San Francisco based investment firm, founded in 1930 by Van Duyn Dodge and E. Morris Cox, that provides professional investment management services.

== Background ==
Dodge & Cox specializes in value investing and often uses contrarian strategies by emphasizing companies which they believe have good long-term prospects but have suffered temporary setbacks. The firm has been described as "best known for its conservatively managed funds with solid track records and modest fees." Having been created during the Great Depression, the firm has "a razor sharp focus on capital preservation". Co-founder E. Morris Cox, who worked at the firm into his 90s, objected to widespread practices he considered unethical during the early 20th Century history of investment banking and thus Dodge & Cox developed policies putting customer interests as a top priority. Dodge & Cox practices a team-based management strategy and as of 2020, the firm had US$325 billion in assets under management, and one of their funds was among the largest 25 American mutual funds.

Headquartered in San Francisco, California, the company offers seven no-load mutual funds as of November 2026: a domestic stock fund, an international stock fund, a balanced fund, an income fund, a global stock fund, a global bond fund and an emerging markets stock fund. The emerging markets fund opened to the public in May 2021. Dodge & Cox has never obsoleted a mutual fund.

Their balanced fund, comprising 50-70% large company stocks and the remainder in bonds, was established in 1931 and is one of the oldest US mutual funds still in operation as of February 2019. Unusually for an investment firm, particularly of their size, Dodge & Cox does not advertise, has only one office and "has no public relations office and no sales force." In 2007, Dodge and Cox ranked second after The Vanguard Group for overall customer satisfaction in a survey by Cogent Research of customers with at least $100,000 in mutual fund assets.

Due to their devotion to the principles of value investing, Dodge & Cox avoided the worst of the dot com bubble during the late 1990s and early 2000 by limiting their exposure to overvalued and then-trendy internet stocks, thereby significantly out-performing the broader market when the bubble collapsed. However, the firm saw major losses in 2008 due to large holdings in the financial sector that was affected by the 2008 financial crisis, including several firms that saw total or near-complete losses for shareholders (e.g., Wachovia Bank and AIG). According to a 2017 Morningstar, Inc. analysis, the firm's low staff turnover and investing principles have been largely beneficial over the long-term, though with bouts of sluggishness when growth stocks were more in favor than value stocks. From 2012 to 2016, their US large company fund saw substantial outflows of $10 billion due in part to the increasing popularity of lower fee index funds, but in this same period their other funds saw more contributions than withdrawals.

John C. Bogle of The Vanguard Group was a strong proponent of index funds, but singled out Dodge & Cox among a handful of active mutual fund managers he would recommend due to their low fees, sober management and avoidance of trends.
