= Occidental, California =

Occidental Howards
- census-designated place
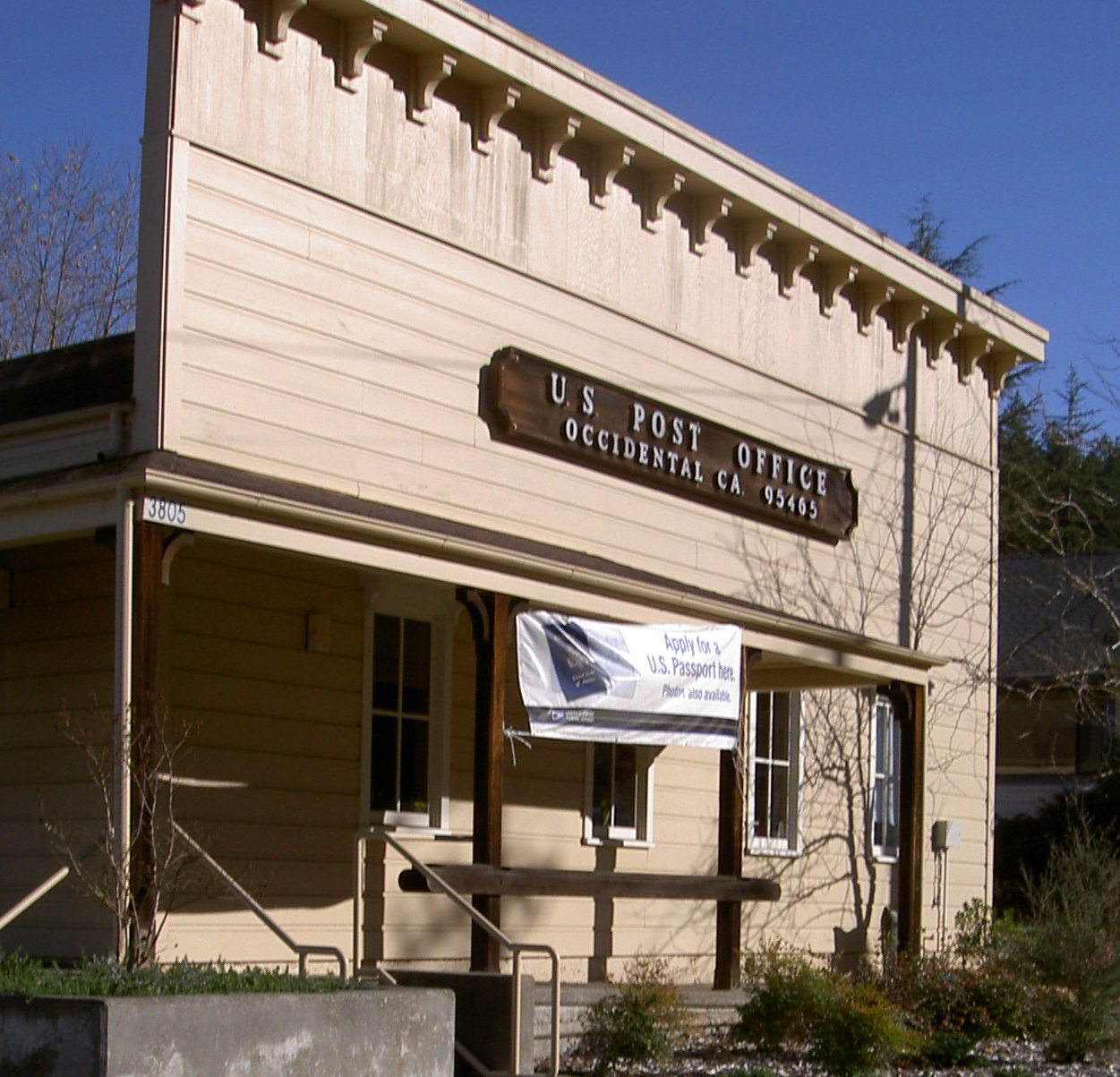
- Occidental, California, post office

- Location in Sonoma County and the state of California

- Location in the United States Location in California
- Coordinates: 38°24′27″N 122°56′54″W
- Country: United States
- State: California
- County: Sonoma

Area
  - Total: 4.966 sq mi (12.862 km^{2})
  - Land: 4.966 sq mi (12.862 km^{2})
  - Water: 0 sq mi (0 km^{2}) 0%
- Elevation: 594 ft (181 m)

Population (2020)
  - Total: 1,132
  - Density: 227.9/sq mi (88.01/km^{2})
- Time zone: UTC−8 (PST)
  - Summer (DST): UTC−7 (PDT)
- ZIP Code: 95465
- Area code: 707
- FIPS code: 06-53266
- GNIS feature ID: 277568

Occidental is a census-designated place (CDP) in Sonoma County, California, United States. The population was 1,132 at the 2020 census, up from 1,115 at the 2010 census.

== History ==
Founded in 1876, Occidental was a stop on the North Pacific Coast Railroad connecting Cazadero to the Sausalito ferry. In return for donating right-of-way to the railroad, a local landowner named "Dutch Bill" Howards received a lifetime railway pass, and the station was named after him.

The railway caused a rapid expansion of the timber industry, and by 1877 there were six sawmills in the Occidental area. Trains also brought vacationers from San Francisco.

== Geography ==
Occidental has a total area of 4.97 sq mi (12.9 km^{2}), all land.

== Climate ==
The cooperative National Weather Service station reports that Occidental has cool, wet winters and warm, dry summers.

Average January temperatures range from 41.8 to 54.5 °F (5.4 to 12.5 °C) and average July temperatures range from 51.4 to 77.9 °F (10.8 to 25.5 °C). The record highest temperature was 103 °F (39.4 °C) on July 22, 2006, and the record lowest temperature was 28 °F (−2.2 °C) on March 11, 2006. There are an average of 12.8 afternoons with highs of 90 °F (32.2 °C) or higher and an average of 2.1 mornings with lows of 32 °F (0 °C) or lower.

Average annual rainfall is 55.19 inches (1,401.8 mm). The wettest "rain year" was from July 1997 to June 1998 with 102.89 inches (2,613.4 mm) and the driest was from July 2000 to June 2001 with 29.84 inches (757.9 mm). The most rainfall in one month was 36.62 inches (930.1 mm) in January 1995. The most rainfall in 24 hours was 8.51 inches (216.2 mm) on January 5, 1966. Average annual snowfall is only 0.2 inches (0.51 cm). The most snowfall was 11.0 inches (28 cm) in January 1974.

Climate data for Occidental, California
Month	Jan	Feb	Mar	Apr	May	Jun	Jul	Aug	Sep	Oct	Nov	Dec	Year
Mean daily maximum °F (°C)	54.7 (12.6)	56.8 (13.8)	60.9 (16.1)	63.6 (17.6)	70.1 (21.2)	75.9 (24.4)	77.8 (25.4)	77.7 (25.4)	76.4 (24.7)	71.4 (21.9)	60.8 (16.0)	54.7 (12.6)	66.7 (19.3)
Mean daily minimum °F (°C)	42.1 (5.6)	42.5 (5.8)	43.8 (6.6)	43.8 (6.6)	47.4 (8.6)	50.6 (10.3)	51.0 (10.6)	52.1 (11.2)	52.8 (11.6)	50.8 (10.4)	45.4 (7.4)	42.7 (5.9)	47.1 (8.4)
Average precipitation inches (mm)	11.16 (283)	9.18 (233)	7.16 (182)	3.38 (86)	1.56 (40)	0.47 (12)	0.07 (1.8)	0.24 (6.1)	0.54 (14)	3.26 (83)	7.08 (180)	10.19 (259)	54.29 (1,379.9)
Average precipitation days (≥ 0.01 inch)	11	10	11	6	4	1	0	1	2	5	9	11	71
Source: Western Regional Climate Center

== Demographics ==
Historical population
Census	Pop.	Note	%±
1880	97		—
1990	1,300		—
2000	1,272		−2.2%
2010	1,115		−12.3%
2020	1,132		1.5%
2021 (est.)	1,126	▼	−0.5%
U.S. Decennial Census; U.S Census 1880-1980, 1860–1870 1880-1890; 1900 1910 1920; 1930 1940 1950; 1960 1970 1980; 1990 2000 2010; 2020

Occcidental first appeared as a census designated place in the 1990 U.S. census.

=== Racial and ethnic composition ===
Occidental CDP, California – Racial and ethnic composition Note: the US Census treats Hispanic/Latino as an ethnic category. This table excludes Latinos from the racial categories and assigns them to a separate category. Hispanics/Latinos may be of any race.
Race / Ethnicity (NH = Non-Hispanic)	Pop 2000	Pop 2010	Pop 2020	% 2000	% 2010	% 2020
White alone (NH)	1,134	948	928	89.15%	85.02%	81.98%
Black or African American alone (NH)	7	7	5	0.55%	0.63%	0.44%
Native American or Alaska Native alone (NH)	10	6	2	0.79%	0.54%	0.18%
Asian alone (NH)	15	31	19	1.18%	2.78%	1.68%
Native Hawaiian or Pacific Islander alone (NH)	3	0	0	0.24%	0.00%	0.00%
Other race alone (NH)	10	0	16	0.79%	0.00%	1.41%
Mixed race or Multiracial (NH)	34	42	80	2.67%	3.77%	7.07%
Hispanic or Latino (any race)	59	81	82	4.64%	7.26%	7.24%
Total	1,272	1,115	1,132	100.00%	100.00%	100.00%

=== 2020 census ===
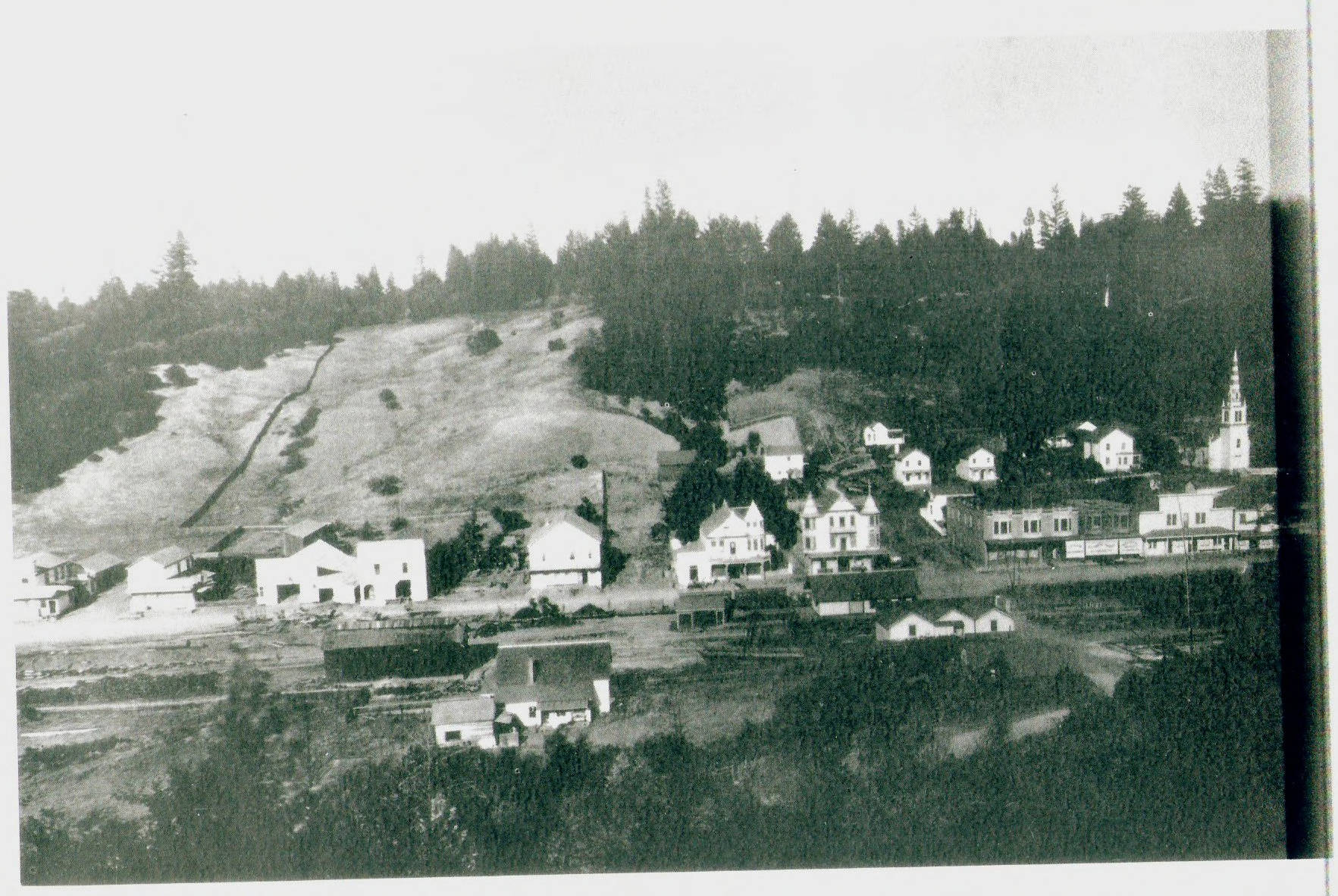
Occidental, 1902

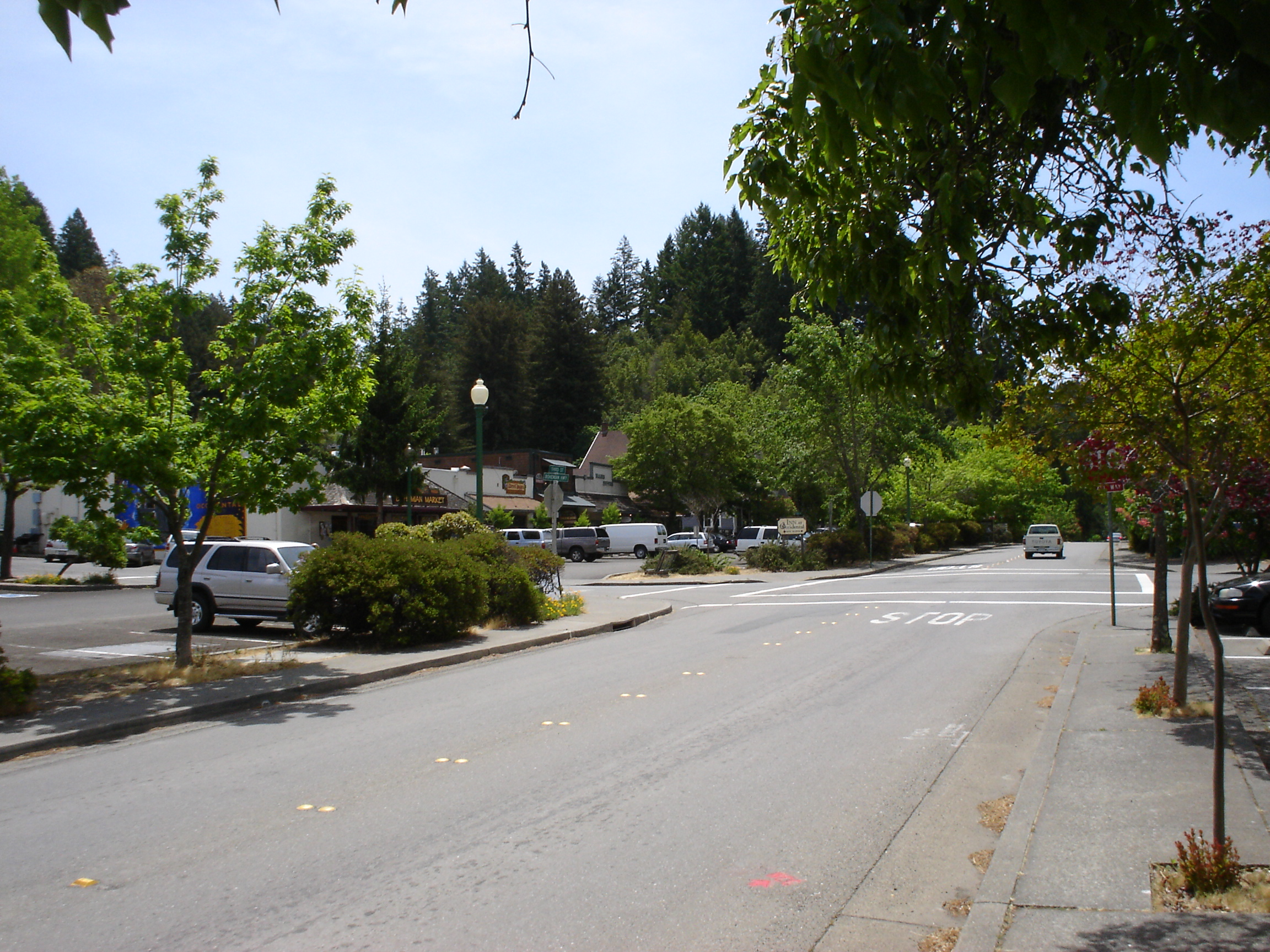
Downtown Occidental, 2008

As of the 2020 census, Occidental had a population of 1,132 and a population density of 228.0 inhabitants per square mile (88.0/km^{2}). The age distribution was 168 people (14.8%) under the age of 18, 53 people (4.7%) aged 18 to 24, 209 people (18.5%) aged 25 to 44, 347 people (30.7%) aged 45 to 64, and 355 people (31.4%) who were 65 years of age or older. The median age was 54.3 years. For every 100 females, there were 106.2 males, and for every 100 females age 18 and over, there were 100.8 males.

The census reported that 100% of the population lived in households. There were 525 households, out of which 88 (16.8%) had children under the age of 18 living in them, 237 (45.1%) were married-couple households, 50 (9.5%) were cohabiting couple households, 124 (23.6%) had a female householder with no partner present, and 114 (21.7%) had a male householder with no partner present. 150 households (28.6%) were one person, and 69 (13.1%) were one person aged 65 or older. The average household size was 2.16. There were 313 families (59.6% of all households).

0.0% of residents lived in urban areas, while 100.0% lived in rural areas.

There were 625 housing units at an average density of 125.9 units per square mile (48.6 units/km^{2}), of which 525 (84.0%) were occupied. Of these, 358 (68.2%) were owner-occupied and 167 (31.8%) were occupied by renters. The homeowner vacancy rate was 2.5% and the rental vacancy rate was 7.5%.

=== Income and poverty ===
In 2023, the US Census Bureau estimated that the median household income was $104,044, and the per capita income was $93,698. About 6.9% of families and 11.0% of the population were below the poverty line.

=== 2010 census ===
At the 2010 census Occidental had a population of 1,115. The population density was 224.5 inhabitants per square mile (86.7/km^{2}). The racial makeup of Occidental was 992 (89.0%) White, 7 (0.6%) African American, 7 (0.6%) Native American, 31 (2.8%) Asian, 0 (0.0%) Pacific Islander, 23 (2.1%) from other races, and 55 (4.9%) from two or more races. Hispanic or Latino of any race were 81 people (7.3%).

The census reported that 100% of the population lived in households.

There were 532 households, 134 (25.2%) had children under the age of 18 living in them, 228 (42.9%) were opposite-sex married couples living together, 44 (8.3%) had a female householder with no husband present, 25 (4.7%) had a male householder with no wife present. There were 39 (7.3%) unmarried opposite-sex partnerships, and 14 (2.6%) same-sex married couples or partnerships. 172 households (32.3%) were one person and 40 (7.5%) had someone living alone who was 65 or older. The average household size was 2.10. There were 297 families (55.8% of households); the average family size was 2.65.

The age distribution was 192 people (17.2%) under the age of 18, 52 people (4.7%) aged 18 to 24, 264 people (23.7%) aged 25 to 44, 462 people (41.4%) aged 45 to 64, and 145 people (13.0%) who were 65 or older. The median age was 48.5 years. For every 100 females, there were 103.8 males. For every 100 females age 18 and over, there were 99.8 males.

There were 673 housing units at an average density of 135.5 per square mile (52.3/km^{2}), of which 68.6% were owner-occupied and 31.4% were occupied by renters. The homeowner vacancy rate was 4.2%; the rental vacancy rate was 6.6%. 70.3% of the population lived in owner-occupied housing units and 29.7% lived in rental housing units.

The median household income was $64,714 (+19.8% from 2000), and the median family income was $87,759 (+30.0% from 2000). The median per capita income for the CDP was $40,903 (+57.5% from 2000). For comparison, statewide California median per capita income in the 2010 Census was $27,885 (+22.8% from 2000).

== Economy ==
The large number of craft breweries and wineries in the area have made Barley and Hops Tavern and Sonoma Fine Wine store in downtown Occidental local and tourist destinations.

The tool-belt manufacturing company Occidental Leather started in an Occidental barn and later moved to downtown Occidental.

The Occidental Arts and Ecology Center (OAEC) is a non-profit organization located near Occidental. Situated on an 80-acre ecological reserve near the Russian River, OAEC works with communities in the region to restore and build cultural and biological diversity.

== Government ==
In the state legislature, Occidental is in the 2nd Senate District and in the 2nd Assembly District.

Federally, Occidental is in California's 2nd congressional district, represented by Democrat Jared Huffman.

== Education ==
The school districts are Harmony Union School District and West Sonoma County Union High School District.

== Notable people ==
- Les Claypool, musician
- Nick Gravenites, musician
- Mickey Hart, musician, percussionist
- Alicia Bay Laurel, artist, author and musician
- Terence McKenna, ethnobotanist
- Robert Nichols, actor
- Max Thieriot, actor, grew up in Occidental
- Kitaro, musician
- Tom Waits, musician
