= Brian Barish =

American businessman

Brian Barish is an American financial and investment manager. He is president of the Denver based investment firm Cambiar Investors, LLC. He has been the portfolio manager of the Cambiar Opportunity Fund, a mutual fund that, as of February 2007, has outperformed the S&P 500 stock market index eight years in a row. He has been rated by The Motley Fool.
