= The Fraternity =

Informal Bay Area cocaine trafficking network, 1970s–early 1980s

- Founded: Early 1970s
- Founding location: San Francisco Bay Area, California
- Years active: 1970s–early 1980s
- Territory: Northern California; supply links in Cali, Colombia
- Leaders: Stephen Jay Green; José Robert Gomez-Soto; Enrique "Kiki" Otoya
- Activities: Cocaine trafficking and distribution

The Fraternity was the informal name used by the San Francisco Examiner for a cocaine trafficking network based in the San Francisco Bay Area in the 1970s and early 1980s. It centered on dealer Stephen Jay Green and connected Northern California distributors with suppliers in Cali, Colombia. The group operated through personal friendships, family ties, and commercial arrangements rather than a formal hierarchy.

The network was the subject of The Cocaine Fraternity, a five-part series by Phil Bronstein published in the Examiner from 15 to 19 November 1982. The series reported that Green's associates handled roughly 1,000 pounds (450 kilograms) of cocaine between 1977 and 1980, with an estimated wholesale value of $20 million.

The operation began to break down after Green's arrest in August 1980. Following his conviction he cooperated with federal prosecutors and testified against former associates, including members of his extended family. The resulting cases involved trafficking charges, tax offenses, and an alleged conspiracy to murder federal officials and witnesses.

== History ==
=== Origins and early development ===
Stephen Jay Green grew up in the East Bay and began dealing drugs in the late 1960s or early 1970s, initially marijuana and LSD before shifting to cocaine. On trips to South America he met Louie DeDeaux, a Cali dealer of about the same age. The Examiner described DeDeaux as friendly and accommodating. Green later testified that one early purchase from him was approximately 1¼ kilograms; he continued doing business with DeDeaux afterward.

Around the same period Green met Robert Gomez (José Robert Gomez-Soto), an American businessman with Colombian connections. Green later married Gomez's daughter Shelly.

=== Expansion, 1977–1980 ===
By 1977 the scale had increased. Green, Gomez-Soto, and Enrique “Kiki” Otoya (who married another Gomez daughter) coordinated supply, shipping, and distribution in the Bay Area. Shipments moved by sea, commercial carriers, and private aircraft.

In December 1978 roughly 112 pounds of cocaine arrived concealed inside wooden posts shipped from Colombia. The load was recovered and distributed through Green's Northern California contacts. Sales were often multi-kilogram cash transactions. By the late 1970s some participants had acquired luxury vehicles, residential property, boats, and other assets; the series noted associated bank deposits and financial records.

=== Arrest of Stephen Green ===
Green was arrested on 14 August 1980 at San Francisco International Airport after a controlled buy. The transaction was arranged with information from Bobby Joe Smith, a Reno-area dealer who had begun cooperating with the DEA. Agents later searched Green's San Francisco apartment and recovered cocaine, cash, and transaction records.

He was convicted in October 1981. Facing a lengthy sentence, he agreed to cooperate with federal authorities.

=== Federal prosecutions ===
Green's cooperation contributed to cases against former associates, including members of the Gomez family. José Robert Gomez-Soto was investigated for trafficking and tax offenses. In 1984 the Ninth Circuit affirmed his convictions for income-tax evasion and related charges; evidence obtained in a search of his Woodside residence was central to the case. The opinion noted that corporations purportedly engaged in lumber exports were used to smuggle cocaine inside hollow wooden doors and posts.

The investigation also produced an indictment alleging a conspiracy to murder Green and several federal officials. In September 1982 Gomez-Soto and his son Peter were charged in connection with the plot, which reportedly targeted Judge Robert P. Aguilar, prosecutor William Farmer, DEA agent Lowrey Leong, and others. The New York Times reported that two convicts at Lompoc prison told authorities Gomez-Soto had approached them separately with offers of money and cocaine to carry out the killings; the paper identified Luis Enrique (Kiki) Otoya Toban as a reputed Colombian supplier and Gomez's son-in-law who was expected to provide funds.

== Organization ==
=== Leadership and principal figures ===
The network operated through overlapping commercial and personal relationships rather than a single hierarchy. It included independent suppliers, regional distributors, transportation specialists, and family associates. The Examiner series identified the following individuals among prominent participants or associates; legal outcomes varied and inclusion does not imply conviction in every case.

| Individual | Reported role | Background |
|---|---|---|
| Stephen Jay Green | Principal California distributor | Coordinated purchases and regional distribution; became a government witness after his conviction. |
| José Robert Gomez-Soto (Robert Gomez) | Financial and commercial associate | Green's father-in-law; later convicted in federal proceedings involving cocaine conspiracies and tax evasion. |
| Enrique "Kiki" Otoya | Colombian supply and transportation associate | Brother-in-law of Green; identified as a major participant in the international operation. |
| Louie DeDeaux | Early Colombian supplier | Cali-based dealer who supplied Green in the network's formative years; Green testified to purchasing roughly 1¼ kilograms and conducting further transactions. |
| Eduardo Garrido | Colombian supplier | Named in the Examiner investigation as a significant cocaine dealer. |
| Willie Bueno | Colombian associate | Named in federal proceedings concerning supply and transportation. |
| Mario Otoya | Alleged supplier | Brother of Kiki Otoya; charged in connection with distribution and storage. |
| Julian Otoya | Alleged Colombian operations associate | Connected in reporting to the Colombian side of the operation. |
| Carlos Tulio Gomez | Alleged supplier | Colombian associate named in distribution proceedings. |

=== Regional distributors and associates ===
A second group handled regional sales, transportation, or related activities.

| Individual | Reported involvement |
|---|---|
| Robin Rohrer | Early California distributor who later became involved in Hawaii. |
| Jake Rohrer | Regional distributor and associate of Green. |
| John Bump | Distributor associated with Green during the 1970s. |
| Joe McCarty | Green associate involved in cocaine distribution. |
| Frankie Dunn | Early associate of Green; charges against him were later dismissed. |
| Brad Sinclair | Assisted with concealment techniques and transportation; later cooperated with authorities. |
| Russell Weidman | Associate identified in connection with transportation. |
| Howie Vogel | Attorney convicted in connection with cocaine-related financial transactions. |
| John Viljeon | Associate charged with selling cocaine to Green. |
| Bobby Joe Smith | Reno-area dealer who became a federal informant. |

=== Gomez family connections ===
Family ties were central. Robert Gomez's daughters Shelly Gomez Green and Linda Gomez Otoya married Stephen Green and Enrique Otoya, respectively, linking American distribution with Colombian supply. Other relatives named in the investigation included Pat Gomez, Lisa Gomez Murphy, Peter Gomez, and Ed Murphy. Several faced charges; others were described as witnesses or associates. Outcomes varied.

== Trafficking operations ==
=== International supply routes ===
Cocaine came from suppliers in Colombia, particularly around Cali. The Examiner series documented transportation by maritime cargo, aircraft, and concealed compartments in commercial shipments. One method involved drilling cavities into wooden posts, inserting containers of cocaine, and sealing the openings with wooden plugs before shipping the posts as commercial lumber.

=== Domestic distribution ===
Green's primary territory was Northern California, especially the San Francisco Bay Area. The network sold to independent dealers who redistributed the cocaine. Green's personal records tracked purchases, payments, debts, and profits. The series described an informal culture in which transactions often occurred among friends and acquaintances, sometimes alongside social gatherings.

=== Finances and assets ===
The operation generated substantial cash. Portions were deposited into personal or business accounts or invested in property and luxury goods. Financial records obtained in the federal investigations included deposits linked to major shipments. Gomez-Soto's business activities, including those involving Colombian wood-importing companies, were examined in the proceedings that led to his convictions.

== Investigation and dissolution ==
The federal investigation involved the DEA, the Internal Revenue Service, and other agencies. Green's 1980 arrest and subsequent cooperation yielded information on international suppliers, transportation arrangements, finances, and the domestic network. By 1982 the operation described in the Examiner series had largely ceased in its earlier form, although criminal proceedings continued.

== Media coverage ==
=== The San Francisco Examiner investigation ===
In November 1982 the San Francisco Examiner published Bronstein's five-part series The Cocaine Fraternity. It reconstructed Green's activities from early dealing through the expansion of Colombian supply relationships, his arrest, and his cooperation with authorities. According to the newspaper, Bronstein spent six weeks preparing the series, reviewing thousands of pages of court records, affidavits, trial transcripts, financial documents, personal correspondence, and Green's drug-dealing records, and interviewing more than 70 individuals connected to the case.

== See also ==
- Illegal drug trade in the United States
- Cocaine trafficking
- Organized crime in California
- Cali Cartel
- Drug Enforcement Administration
