= David Warthen =

American businessman

David Warthen (born December 10, 1957) was one of the founders of Ask Jeeves, subsequently called Ask.com, an internet search engine. Warthen has served as Chief Technology Officer or Vice President of Engineering for a variety of companies, many of them start-ups, over his career.

David Warthen obtained B.A (Computer Science) from University of California, San Diego, and attended PhD program at University of California, Berkeley (2002 - 2004) but did not obtain a degree.
