= Gaia, Inc. =

Video streaming service

- Type: Public
- Traded as: Nasdaq: GAIA (Class A); Russell 2000 Component
- Industry: Video production
- Founded: 1988; 38 years ago Boulder, Colorado, U.S.
- Founder: Jirka Rysavy
- Headquarters: Louisville, Colorado, U.S.
- Key people: James Colquhoun (CEO); Ned Preston (CFO); Kiersten Medvedich (President)
- Website: www.gaia.com

Gaia, Inc. is a publicly traded (NASDAQ:GAIA) American media company founded in 1988 by Jirka Rysavy in Louisville, Colorado. It owns and operates Gaia TV, a subscription video on-demand service consisting of original and licensed alternative media documentaries, including those on wellness, spirituality and conspiracy theories.

The service has been criticized for promoting false and misleading claims, including anti-vaccine misinformation.

As of September 13, 2018, Gaia TV had over 500,000 subscribers in 185 countries. As of 2024, they had 806,000 subscribers.

== History ==
Gaia was founded in 1988 by Czechoslovak-born entrepreneur Jirka Ryšavý. Originally branding itself as a yoga equipment brand, Gaia sold mail-order exercise videos and alternative medicine products.

Gaia began several acquisition and merging endeavors in the early 2000s. In 2001, Gaia merged with the Californian company Real Goods Solar, a residential and commercial solar power integrator with a focus on off-the-grid living. Gaia continued expansion and in 2003 bought a 50.1% share in its UK distributor Leisure Systems International (LSI). In 2005, Gaia acquired the media assets of GoodTimes Entertainment and Jetlag Productions. The company additionally acquired both Lime TV and Zaadz.com in 2007 to start what was called the LOHAS network (LOHAS stands for Lifestyles of Health and Sustainability). In 2008, Rysavy stepped down as CEO.

In 2011, Gaia launched Gaia TV, a streaming service. The company acquired Vivendi Entertainment, a DVD distributor from Vivendi subsidiary Universal Music Group Distribution, merging it with its home entertainment division to form Gaiam Vivendi Entertainment.

In 2016, Sequential Brands Group purchased the Gaiam brand and yoga equipment unit for $167 million. Gaia subsequently rebranded itself, focusing solely on its alternative media streaming service. Over the next three years, the service would increase in popularity. In 2019, USA Today ranked Gaia, Inc as the world's fastest-growing retailer, spending up to 120% of its revenue on advertising. Gaia also sold its travel business for $12 million.

Gaia added live streaming events from a new event center at its Louisville, Colorado campus in 2019. Events are live-streamed in 185 countries with simultaneous translation.

In November 2021, American singer and actor Demi Lovato became the first celebrity ambassador for Gaia. Lovato announced via Instagram that they were partnering with Gaia, stating, "Thrilled to be a Gaia ambassador, understanding the world around us (the known and the unknown) is so exciting to me!"

Gaia acquired the digital video service Yoga International in December 2021.

In 2023, Gaia appointed James Colquhoun to the new position of Chief Operating Officer. During this time Gaia also announced an AI-powered search engine for their content library. In March 2024, Gaia launched Gaia+, a premium membership providing access to workshops, live events, and guided programs.

== Programming ==
Gaia's content library encompasses over 10,000 films on a variety of alternative media subjects, ranging from yoga and meditation to alternative medicine and conspiracy theories. Gaia's content library includes documentaries exploring unidentified aerial phenomena (UAPs), ancient civilizations, alternative archaeological theories, and topics related to 5G technology and vaccine science.

== Controversy ==
In 2018, former Gaia contributor and paranormal writer David Wilcock made public allegations against the company, which Gaia said led to harassment of employees. Wilcock later apologized and said his remarks had been taken out of context. That same year, former Gaia contractor Patty Greer made a series of allegations against the company, including claims that Gaia promoted Luciferianism and removed her films from its website after a dispute over distribution rights."

In February 2021, Business Insider published an investigative piece detailing workplace harassment and concerns about the surveillance of Gaia employees by the company. These concerns stemmed from Gaia offering blood tests to employees, as well as unsupported reports that Rysavy had installed 'a machine' on the roof of Gaia headquarters to 'psychically monitor employees.'

Following videos and posts from Greer claiming Gaia was infiltrated by satanists and reptilians, Gaia sued Greer for slander. Gaia claimed that Greer was retaliating after a decline in viewership of her videos hosted on Gaia's streaming services. On December 14, 2018, the case was dismissed without prejudice, noting that Greer had not been served. On December 27, Gaia filed another lawsuit against Greer, seeking one million in damages. The lawsuit was settled in 2019, and Greer posted an apology to her website as part of a settlement agreement and removed all of the content surrounding Gaia and #GEM. In her apology, Greer stated "many of those postings were critical of Gaia and its employees, and were either based on my own opinion or information I received from various third-parties (sometimes anonymously). Because I was ultimately unable to corroborate or confirm the information — which Gaia believed to be untrue and unfounded, and which Gaia vehemently denied at all times — I agreed to remove the postings."
