= Real Goods =

Defunct American retail and wholesale e-commerce solar energy company

- Type: Subsidiary
- Industry: Energy
- Genre: Off-grid and renewable energy
- Founded: 1978
- Founders: John Schaeffer and Steve Troy
- Defunct: 2019
- Fate: Acquired
- Successor: The Alternative Energy Store Inc. (altE Store)
- Headquarters: Ukiah, California, United States
- Area served: United States
- Key people: Sascha Deri (CEO)
- Products: Renewable energy systems and storage
- Owner: The Alternative Energy Store Inc. (altE Store)
- Website: realgoods.com

Real Goods Trading Corporation (commonly referred to as Real Goods) was an American retail and wholesale e-commerce business located in Ukiah, California, that sold solar power and renewable energy systems and resources for people interested in living off the grid or with a low environmental impact. The company was acquired by AltE Store in 2019, which became part of California based GigaWatt Inc. in 2024.

== History ==
=== Foundation ===
In 1977, Real Goods President and cofounder John Schaeffer was 29 years old and living in an off-grid community in Mendocino County, California. As one of the few members of the community with a vehicle and a commute, he became the designated person to pick up supplies for the community. In 1978, Schaeffer took $3,000 in savings and a $5,000 loan from his father and bought a 50% share of an alternative energy store Open Circle from Steve Troy in Willits, California Steve Troy and John Schaeffer then changed the name from Open Circle to Real Goods Trading Company. that sold all the "real goods" for off-grid living at fair prices.

During the store's first year, They bought 100 9-Watt solar panels for $600 each and sold them for $900 each to people interested in getting their electricity from a source other than an electric utility. These sales made Real Goods the first company to sell a solar panel commercially in the United States.

By 1982, Real Goods had opened two additional stores in Ukiah, California and Santa Rosa, California, and published the first edition of The Alternative Energy Source Book which was written by Steve Troy, as a comprehensive source for sustainable living principles and practices. By 1985, the three Real Goods stores had closed. Steve Troy left Real Goods and focused his company Jade Mountain (founded in 1979) on appropriate technology and renewable energy systems. He sold half of that business in 1999 to Gaiam and worked on creating Gaiam Energy Tech which became Real Goods Solar after he sold the second half of Jade Mountain to Gaiam in 2001. John Schaeffer invested his last $3,000 in a 16-page catalog, successfully reinventing the company as a mail order business operating out of his garage.

In 1991, Real Goods held its first direct public stock offering (DPO), selling stock directly to its customers, and raised $1 million. The following year, Real Goods declared a National Off-The-Grid Day - which became the National Tour of Solar Homes - during which the public could see solar-powered living firsthand. Real Goods held its second stock offering in 1993. In 1994, the company used those funds to break ground on the Solar Living Center in Hopland, California, which is home to the Real Goods retail store today, as well as the Solar Living Institute. The same year, Real Goods launched its e-commerce business.

=== Partnership with Gaiam and the birth of Real Goods solar ===
In 2001, Real Goods merged with the sustainable lifestyle company Gaiam in a stock swap worth $8.7 million. Per the merger agreement, Real Goods shareholders received one share of Gaiam's Class A common stock for each 10 shares of Real Goods stock owned, and Real Goods' headquarters moved to Broomfield, Colorado.

With the influx of additional capital from the Gaiam merger behind it, Real Goods opened a residential solar panel installation division in 2002 called Real Goods Solar. Real Goods Solar began installing home solar panel systems in Colorado, where Real Goods was now headquartered, and in California, where it maintained the Solar Living Center. Real Goods Solar's success led Real Goods to launch a commercial solar panel installation division in 2004.

In 2008, Real Goods - with Gaiam as its majority shareholder - moved into new corporate headquarters in Louisville, Colorado and began using solar power itself with a 100 kW solar photovoltaic system installed by Real Goods Solar. The Louisville headquarters featured a number of other environmentally-friendly features including low-VOC paint, bamboo flooring and cabinetry, environmentally-friendly carpet and glue, recycled office cubicles, and an office recycling program that included compost collection. Many Real Goods company parties were zero-waste events.

=== Initial Public Offering and solar installation expansion ===
On May 8, 2008, Real Goods completed an initial public offering (IPO) as Real Goods Solar and raised $55 million. Real Goods Solar began trading on the Nasdaq under the symbol RSOL. Through holding 100% of Real Goods Solar's Class B shares, Gaiam maintained control of the company.

Between 2007 and 2008, Real Goods Solar, led by Schaeffer as its CEO, acquired four solar panel installation companies in California and became one of the nation's largest solar installers. In November 2007, Real Goods Solar acquired San Rafael, California-based Marin Solar for $3.2 million in cash and stock. In January 2008, Real Goods Solar purchased Hemet, California-based Carlson Solar for $3.2 million in cash and stock. In August 2008, Real Goods Solar acquired Santa Cruz, California-based Independent Energy Systems for $3.6 million. In October 2008, Real Goods Solar acquired Campbell, California-based Regrid Power for $3.8 million in cash and stock.

On December 20, 2011, Real Goods Solar completed a merger agreement with Connecticut-based renewable energy installer Earth Friendly Energy Group Holdings, LLC, d/b/a Alteris Renewables. The combined company retained the Real Goods Solar name, Nasdaq ticker RSOL, and Louisville, Colorado headquarters. Alteris equity holders were issued 8.7 million shares of Real Goods Solar Class A common stock in exchange for 100% of Alteris' outstanding equity.

=== A return to its roots ===
In January 2014, Real Goods Solar announced a combining of its residential and commercial solar installation divisions, a company-wide rebranding as RGS Energy, and a switch from the Nasdaq ticker RSOL to RGSE.

In December 2014, John Schaeffer purchased 100% of the Real Goods retail, catalog, and e-commerce business from RGS Energy for $1 million. Schaeffer, along with his wife Nantzy Hensley, is now once again the sole owner of Real Goods, as he was before the merger with Gaiam.

=== Acquisition by AltE ===
On September 4, 2019, The Alternative Energy Store Inc. (altE) acquired the Real Goods Trading Corporation assets from John Schaeffer, with altE CEO Sascha Deri being named Real Goods CEO. Deri has stated that "As a teenager, I actually remember reading the Real Goods catalog and Solar Living Sourcebook and being inspired by them."

All sales and customer support personnel from Real Goods were retained by altE during the acquisition and continue to promote, sell, inventory, ship, and support solar energy and energy storage solutions out of Northern California. Real Goods continues to operate under the Real Goods name, serving the same customer base of renewable energy users and enthusiasts, both on and off the grid. Together, Real Goods and altE have sold renewable energy systems to over 120,000 customers across all seven continents.

== Solar living center ==
The Solar Living Center (SLC) is a 12-acre living demonstration of permaculture and renewable energy in Hopland, California. It is also home to the nonprofit Solar Living Institute and the Real Goods retail store. The SLC was founded by John Schaeffer in 1994 on land that was formerly a landfill for the California Department of Transportation, and opened in 1996. It is a popular tourist attraction and rest stop along U.S. Route 101, and is notable for some unique features like its "grow-through car" tree grove and its self-proclaimed "weird restrooms" made from recycled plastic bottles and repurposed toilet tank lids. A solar photovoltaic system on the property produces approximately 160,000 kW-hours of electricity annually. The SLC receives as many as 200,000 visitors each year. The SLC is also home to an observation beehive, pollinator garden, children's garden, sculpture garden, permaculture vegetable garden, bamboo pyramid, hops tipi, lavender labyrinth, and bicycle generator exhibit. In October 2015, a solar-powered cannabis dispensary, Emerald Pharms, opened on the property, focusing on the medical, non-psychoactive CBD strains, and on education.

=== Solar living institute ===
In 1998, Schaeffer formed the Solar Living Institute, a 501(c)(3) nonprofit organization whose mission is to promote sustainable living through inspirational environmental education. The Solar Living Institute is headquartered at the Solar Living Center along with the Real Goods retail store. It offers classes and workshops to the public and a year-round internship program.

=== Store ===
The Real Goods retail store was located at the center of the SLC grounds. It was a 5,000 square foot building made of strawbales and pneumatically impacted stabilized earth (PISE), and was designed using passive solar principles so that it requires little additional heat and light beyond what is provided by the sun. The Real Goods retail store is open to the public for shopping, and also houses Real Goods' e-commerce and order fulfillment operations.

== Environmental commitments ==
=== Billion pound goal ===
In 1990, Real Goods set a Billion Pound Goal to prevent a billion pounds of carbon dioxide from entering the atmosphere by 2000 through changes to its business practices and customer purchases of products that reduce CO_{2} emission (calculated using a formula developed by the Union of Concerned Scientists). The company tracked its progress through regular updates in its mail order catalogs, and in 1997 the goal was completed three years early. In 2005, Real Goods set another Billion Pound Goal to be reached by 2010, and in 2008 that goal was reached two years early.

=== Paper and packaging reduction ===
In 2007, Real Goods earned Forest Stewardship Council certification when it increased the post-consumer recycled paper content for its catalogs from 20% to 30%. From 2008 to 2010, Real Goods lowered its paper and printing impact another 75% by reducing paper weight and catalog trim size, and by reducing the number of catalogs mailed by driving more business to its website, as exemplified by the "Don't Buy From This Catalog" campaign the company ran in its Spring/Summer 2010 and Fall/Holiday 2010 catalogs. Real Goods customers were also asked to reduce the number of catalogs they requested, and catalogs were mailed based on past purchase activity.

=== Go Zero ===
In 2006, Gaiam/Real Goods partnered with The Conservation Fund to introduce the world's first carbon-neutral product shipping program called Go Zero. Real Goods made a contribution that allowed Go Zero to plant nearly 1,500 trees, which offset the company's operations at its headquarters and fulfillment center for that year.

=== Solar living sourcebook ===
Real Goods published its first edition of the Solar Living Sourcebook in 1982. It was written as a comprehensive resource for information about renewable energy and sustainable living. Now in its 14th edition and printed using soy ink on 100% post-consumer content recycled paper, there are more than 600,000 copies of the Solar Living Sourcebook in print in 44 English-speaking countries.

=== Recognition ===
The company made Inc. magazine's Top 500 Fastest Growing Companies list and John Schaeffer was the Small Business Administration's Small Business Person of the Year in 1994. Schaeffer also received the 2007 Green Power Pioneer Award, and was inducted into the International Green Industry Hall of Fame in March 2013. Real Goods has received three Rodale Awards, as well as news coverage in The Wall Street Journal, Fortune, Time and numerous other publications.
