= Ask.com =

Answer engine

Coordinates: 37°48′13″N 122°16′31″W

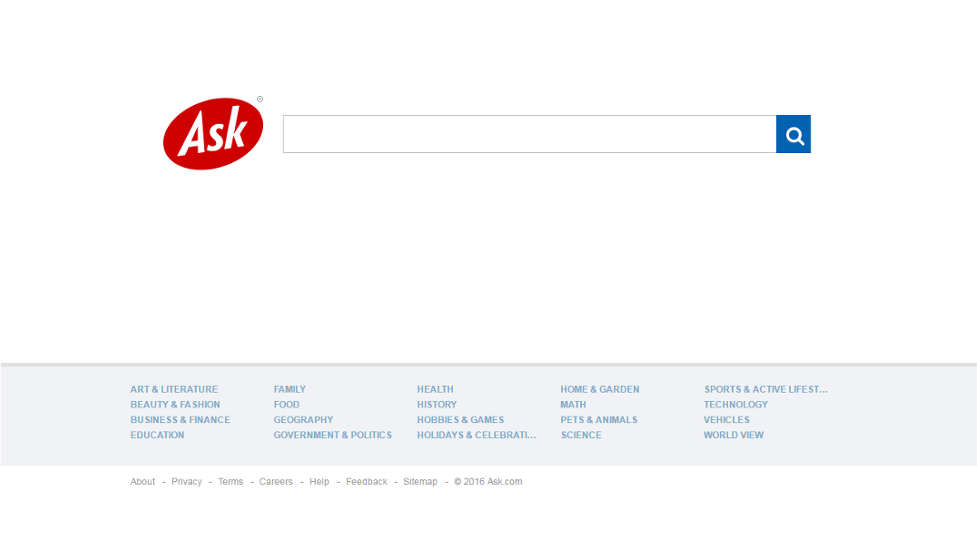
- Ask.com homepage on desktop in 2016
- Former name: Ask Jeeves
- Website type: Answer engine, e-magazine, newsbot, former web search engine
- Available in: English
- Founded: June 3, 1996; 30 years ago
- Dissolved: May 1, 2026; 6 months ago
- Owner: InterActiveCorp/People Incorporated
- Parent: Ask Media Group
- Website: www.ask.com
- Commercial: Yes
- Registration: Optional
- Launched: June 1, 1997; 29 years ago

Ask.com (originally known as Ask Jeeves) was an American answer engine, e-magazine, and later a web search engine, created by Garrett Gruener and David Warthen and launched on June 1, 1997. The service became one of the earliest prominent search engines on the World Wide Web during the late 1990s and early 2000s. Ask.com was shut down on May 1, 2026, ending nearly three decades of operation.

The company was incorporated in Berkeley, California in 1996. The original Ask Jeeves platform was designed to allow users to submit questions in natural language rather than relying solely on keyword-based searches, a feature that distinguished it from many competing search engines of the era. Its branding centered on the character Jeeves, a valet inspired by the fictional servant created by British author P. G. Wodehouse. The site became highly successful during the dot-com bubble.

It was purchased by InterActiveCorp (IAC, now known as People Incorporated) in 2005. In 2006, the company discontinued the "Jeeves" branding and relaunched as Ask.com, focusing more directly on competing with major search engines such as Google, Yahoo! Search, and MSN Search. Ask.com operated its own web crawler and search algorithm for several years, though it struggled to maintain market share against larger competitors and in 2010 ceased developing its own search technology, transitioning back toward a question-and-answer format, outsourcing many search functions to external providers. During the 2010s and 2020s, the site increasingly emphasized curated articles, trending topics, entertainment content, and automated news aggregation.

== History ==
3D render of Jeeves

Ask.com was originally known as Ask Jeeves, "Jeeves" being the name of a "gentleman's personal gentleman", or valet, fetching answers to any question asked. The character was named after Jeeves, Bertie Wooster's valet in the fictional works of P. G. Wodehouse.

The original concept of Ask Jeeves was to allow users to get answers to questions in everyday, natural language, and traditional keyword searching. Throughout its history, Ask was particularly well known for its answer functionality on the topics of mathematics, vocabulary, and unit conversion. Authors also contributed general articles about various other topics, similar to an encyclopedia. As other InterActiveCorp publications were gradually connected with the Ask software, articles on thousands of topics became accessible.

Ask Jeeves was launched as a beta version during mid-April 1997 and was initiated completely on June 1, 1997. The original software was designed and implemented by Gary Chevsky, while Warthen, Chevsky, and Justin Grant led the development of the graphical user interface and the site's initial launch as AskJeeves.com. During the late 1990s dot-com boom, Ask Jeeves expanded rapidly and became publicly traded.

On September 18, 2001, Ask Jeeves acquired search engine Teoma for more than US$1.5 million. In July 2005, Ask Jeeves was acquired by IAC.

In February 2006, the name "Jeeves" was dropped from Ask Jeeves, and the search engine renamed Ask.

On May 16, 2006, Ask implemented a "Binoculars Site Preview" into its search results. On search results pages, the "binoculars" let searchers have a preview of the page they could visit with a mouse-over activating a pop-up screenshot.

On June 5, 2007, Ask.com was redesigned with a 3D appearance.

In December 2007, Ask released the AskEraser feature, allowing users to opt-out from tracking of search queries and IP and cookie values. They also announced they would erase this data after 18 months if the AskEraser option was not set. HTTP cookies must be enabled for AskEraser to function.

An Ask.com search of Wikipedia, 2016

On July 4, 2008, Ask acquired Lexico Publishing Group, which owns Dictionary.com, Thesaurus.com, and Reference.com.

In August 2008, Ask initiated the Ask Kids search engine designed for children.

In April 2009, for the UK version of Ask.com, Jeeves was redesigned as a CGI character and the website was named once again Ask Jeeves, though international versions were still just Ask.com. His image remained on the UK website until July 21, 2016, though the Ask Jeeves name would continue to be used until September 21, 2016, when the website was renamed Ask.

On July 26, 2010, Ask.com released a closed-beta Q&A service. The service was released to the public on July 29, 2010. Ask.com initiated its mobile Q&A application for the iPhone during late 2010.

Ask.com reached 100 million global users per month in 2012 through its website with more than 2 million downloads of its flagship mobile app in that year. The company also released additional applications developed from its Q&A experience, including Ask Around in 2011 and PollRoll in 2012.

=== Search crawler shut-down ===
In 2010, Ask.com shuttered its in-house web search engine service, which was replaced by a new Ask search engine created by a third-party developer. The restructuring programme included the termination of all development on the Ask.com webcrawler, the outsourcing of most web search operations, and the loss of 130 search engineering jobs. The company cited market headwinds and intense competition from larger rivals, such as Google and Yahoo.

Earlier in the year, Ask had initiated a Q&A community for generating answers from real people as opposed to search algorithms. This new service was then combined with the existing question-and–answer repository, which included an extensive archive of query data. The new database and answer engine improved on the original capabilities of the AskJeeves Q&A functions, generating many more answers.

== Corporate details ==
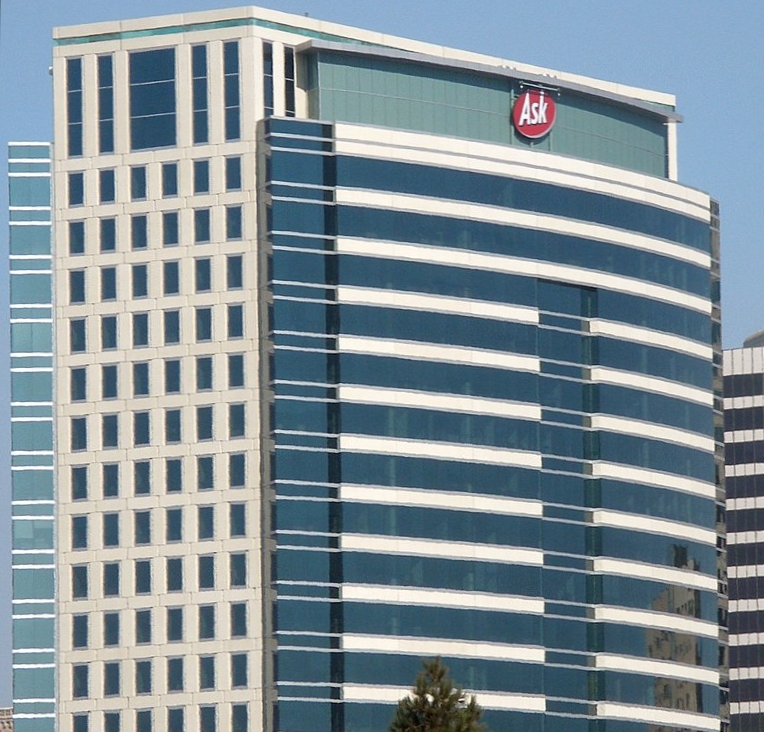
Ask.com headquarters in Oakland, California (photographed in 2006)

The Ask Media Group corporate headquarters was located in downtown Oakland, California, based at the 555 City Center building within the Oakland City Center precinct.

Ask Jeeves, Inc. stock traded on the NASDAQ stock exchange from July 1999 to July 2005, using the ticker symbol ASKJ. In July 2005, the ASKJ ticker was retired upon the acquisition by IAC, valued at $1.85 billion.

The current Ask Media Group president, Douglas Leeds became CEO in 2010.

In 2012, Ask.com made two acquisitions as part of a larger strategy to offer more content on the Ask.com website. On July 2, 2012, Ask.com purchased content discovery start-up nRelate for an undisclosed amount. That was followed by the company's acquisition of expert advice and information site About.com, which closed in September 2012.

On August 14, 2014, Ask.com acquired popular social networking website Ask.fm, where users can ask other users questions, with the option of anonymity. At the time, Ask.fm had 180 million monthly unique users in more than 150 countries, with its largest user base in the United States. Available on the web and as a mobile app, Ask.fm generated an estimated 20,000 questions per minute with approximately 45 percent of its mobile monthly active users logging in daily. As of 2014, the mobile app has been downloaded more than 40 million times.

In 2021, Ask re-initiated its function SymptomFind and introduced the new finance-based site Ask Money.

== Marketing and promotion ==
From November 1999, in some areas Ask Jeeves advertised on produce stickers on apples, oranges and bananas. Questions such as "How many calories in a banana?" were printed alongside the Ask Jeeves web address.

A Jeeves balloon and a float appeared in the Macy's Thanksgiving Day Parade during 2000–2004.

Apostolos Gerasoulis, the co-creator of Ask's Teoma algorithmic search technology, featured in four television advertisements in 2007, extolling the virtues of Ask.com's usefulness for information relevance.

After a hiatus from mass consumer marketing, Ask reinstated its website's format to emphasize questions and answers, and resumed advertising by television during the autumn of 2011. Instead of national advertising, Ask emphasized local markets. During the summer of 2012, initiated a national cinema campaign, along with other out-of-home tactics in certain markets such as New York and Seattle.

As part of a Seattle-based local market effort, Ask.com initiated its campaign "You Asked We Answered" during 2012, in which the company "answered" residents' main complaints about living in their city, including easing morning commutes and stadium traffic, as well as keeping the local Parks and Recreation department's wading pools open.

On January 14, 2009, Ask.com became the official sponsor of 2000 NASCAR Sprint Cup Series Champion Bobby Labonte's No. 96 Ford. Ask would become the official search engine of NASCAR. Ask.com was the primary sponsor for the No. 96 for 18 of the first 21 races and had rights to increase this to a total of 29 races that season. The Ask.com car debuted in the 2009 Bud Shootout where it failed to finish the race, but subsequently returned strongly, placing as high as 5th in a March 1, 2009, Shelby 427 race at Las Vegas Motor Speedway. Ask.com's foray into NASCAR represented the first instance of its venture into what it terms "Super Verticals".

== See also ==
- Comparison of search engines
- List of search engines
- List of search engines by popularity
