= Simpson Manufacturing Company =

Construction materials company

Simpson Manufacturing Co., Inc.
- Type: Public
- Traded as: NYSE: SSD; S&P 400 component
- Industry: Building material
- Founded: 1956; 70 years ago
- Headquarters: 5956 W Las Positas Blvd, Pleasanton, California, U.S.
- Key people: Barclay Simpson
- Products: Structural Connectors, Fasteners, Anchors
- Revenue: ▲US$2.33 billion (2025)
- Net income: ▲US$345 million (2025)
- Number of employees: 3,337 (2019)
- Subsidiaries: Simpson Strong-Tie Company Inc.
- Website: simpsonmfg.com

Simpson Manufacturing Company is a building materials manufacturer in the United States that produces structural connectors, fasteners, anchors, and products for new construction and retrofitting.

The company was founded by Barclay Simpson in Oakland in 1956, as a successor to a window screen company owned by his father, Walter Simpson. Simpson manufactured joist hangers and the company's subsidiary Simpson Strong-Tie Co. Inc. became a dominant producer of structural connectors in North America and Europe. The company subsequently moved to Pleasanton and went public in 1994.
