= John Schaeffer (environmentalist) =

American environmentalist

- Born: November 9, 1949 (age 76); Los Angeles, California, U.S.
- Education: University of California, Berkeley
- Occupations: Environmentalist; author; entrepreneur
- Spouse: Nancy Hensley

John Schaeffer was born November 9, 1949, in Los Angeles, California. He is an American environmentalist, author, entrepreneur, and the founder and president of Real Goods, a sustainable lifestyle catalog and Real Goods Solar, a solar electric system installation business in California and Colorado. He has been actively involved in promoting and popularizing renewable energy since the mid-1970s.

== Early life and inspiration ==
While attending the University of California at Berkeley in the late 1960s, Schaeffer was inspired by Stewart Brand and his colleagues who published the Whole Earth Catalog, particularly by the cover of the issue that featured a 1968 image of Earth taken from space by Apollo 8 Astronaut William Anders. Schaeffer became one of many young people rejecting the established values of the 1950s in favor of the communal living practices associated with the back-to-the-land movement of the 1960s and 1970s. The Whole Earth Catalog, which promoted access to tools, became the bible of this movement and the inspiration for Schaeffer's own catalog, the Real Goods catalog, which sold products useful for independent life in the commune. By the 1980s the Real Goods catalog had become the successor to the Whole Earth Catalog.

== Professional life ==
In 1971, Schaeffer graduated from the University of California at Berkeley and moved north to a 300-acre commune in Mendocino County, California. He embraced the self-reliant lifestyle that included growing his own food and building his own shelter. While he adopted the communal lifestyle, he never accepted that doing so meant he had to sacrifice modern amenities, including watching Saturday Night Live on TV. By hooking up a direct current television to the battery from his VW Bug, he was able to watch his favorite shows. Later, as solar electric panels developed for the space program became available commercially, he used those as the source to charge his storage battery.

Schaeffer started selling solar energy products and earth-friendly tools to his neighbors, and opened the first Real Goods store in Willits, California with a partner in 1978. When the store closed and the partnership dissolved in 1985, Schaeffer, operating out of his garage, continued the business as a mail order catalog.

== Contributions to Solar Living ==
In 1995, Schaeffer and a team of coworkers at Real Goods built the Solar Living Center in Hopland, California on what was once a California Department of Transportation dumping ground. The 12-acre campus contains permaculture gardens, renewable energy and sustainable living demonstrations and an environmental education center. In 1998, Schaeffer founded the educational nonprofit Solar Living Institute, whose mission is to promote sustainable living through inspirational environmental education. The Institute offers educational workshops onsite and online, yearly internships and hosts SolFest, the renewable energy festival that attracts more than 1,000 people each year. ref Schaeffer has authored two books: A Place in the Sun, which tells the story of the Solar Living Center, and The Solar Living Source Book, an all-purpose guide to renewable energy systems and sustainable living that has been described as "If you were going to live off grid and had one book to buy, this would be it."

== Personal life ==
Schaeffer serves as president of Real Goods. He and his wife, Nancy Hensley, live near the Solar Living Center in a passive solar house that is a showcase of the design practices and products that are now defined as the "real goods." The house is made of Rastra-block (a combination of cement and recycled polystyrene beads) and other recycled materials. It is off-the-grid, powered by solar electricity and hydroelectricity, and incorporates principles of permaculture in its grounds and gardens.

Schaeffer and Hensley are organic gardeners who grow most of their own vegetables.

They also make Demeter-certified biodynamic wine from grapes grown on their property, and grow olives and press their own olive oil.

== Awards and nominations ==
- Entrepreneur of the Year - 1993 (nominated)
- Entrepreneur of the Year - 1994 (nominated)
- Small Business Person of the Year in Northern California - 1994 (won)
- Robert Rodale Environmental Achievement Award - 1996 (won)
- American Marketing Association "Edison Award" for corporate environmental achievement - 1997 (won)
- Robert Rodale Environmental Achievement Award - 1997 (won)
- International Design Association "Calibre" environmental achievement award - 1998 (won)
- Robert Rodale Environmental Achievement Award - 1998 (won)
- Green Power Pioneer Award - 2007 (won)
