= History of the University of California, Berkeley =

The history of the University of California, Berkeley, begins on October 13, 1849, with the adoption of the Constitution of California, which provided for the creation of a public university. On Charter Day, March 23, 1868, the signing of the Organic Act established the University of California, with the new institution inheriting the land and facilities of the private College of California and the federal funding eligibility of a public agricultural, mining, and mechanical arts college.

== 19th century ==
=== Founding ===
In 1866, the College of California, a private institution in Oakland founded by Andover and Yale alumnus Henry Durant, purchased the land that comprises the current Berkeley campus, and the State of California established an agricultural, mining, and mechanical arts college, which existed only as a legal entity to secure federal funds under the Morrill Act. Signed by President Lincoln in 1862, the Morrill Act provided for the capitalization of public universities by federal land grant. In 1867, through the good offices of then-governor Frederick Low, the financially struggling College of California agreed to a merger with the state college. On March 23, 1868, Governor Henry H. Haight signed the Organic Act, which established the University of California as the state's first land-grant university. Although the founding of the University of California is often mistaken for a merger, the Organic Act created a "completely new institution" and did not actually merge the two precursor entities into the new university.

The Organic Act — also known as the Dwinelle Bill, named after its principal author, Assemblyman John W. Dwinelle — stated that the "University shall have for its design, to provide instruction and thorough and complete education in all departments of science, literature and art, industrial and professional pursuits, and general education, and also special courses of instruction in preparation for the professions".

Professor John LeConte was appointed interim president, serving until 1870, when the Board of Regents elected Henry Durant.

The university opened in September 1869, using the former College of California's buildings in Oakland as a temporary home while the new campus underwent construction.

=== Early development ===
In 1871, the Board of Regents stated that women should be admitted on an equal basis with men.

On November 7, 1872, Daniel Coit Gilman was inaugurated as the second president of the university. Gilman proclaimed in his inaugural address: "The charter and the name declare that this is to be the 'University of California'. It is not the University of Berlin nor of New Haven which we are to copy ... it is the University of this State. It must be adapted to this people ... It is 'of the people and for the people'—not in any low or unworthy sense, but in the highest and noblest relations to their intellectual and moral well-being".

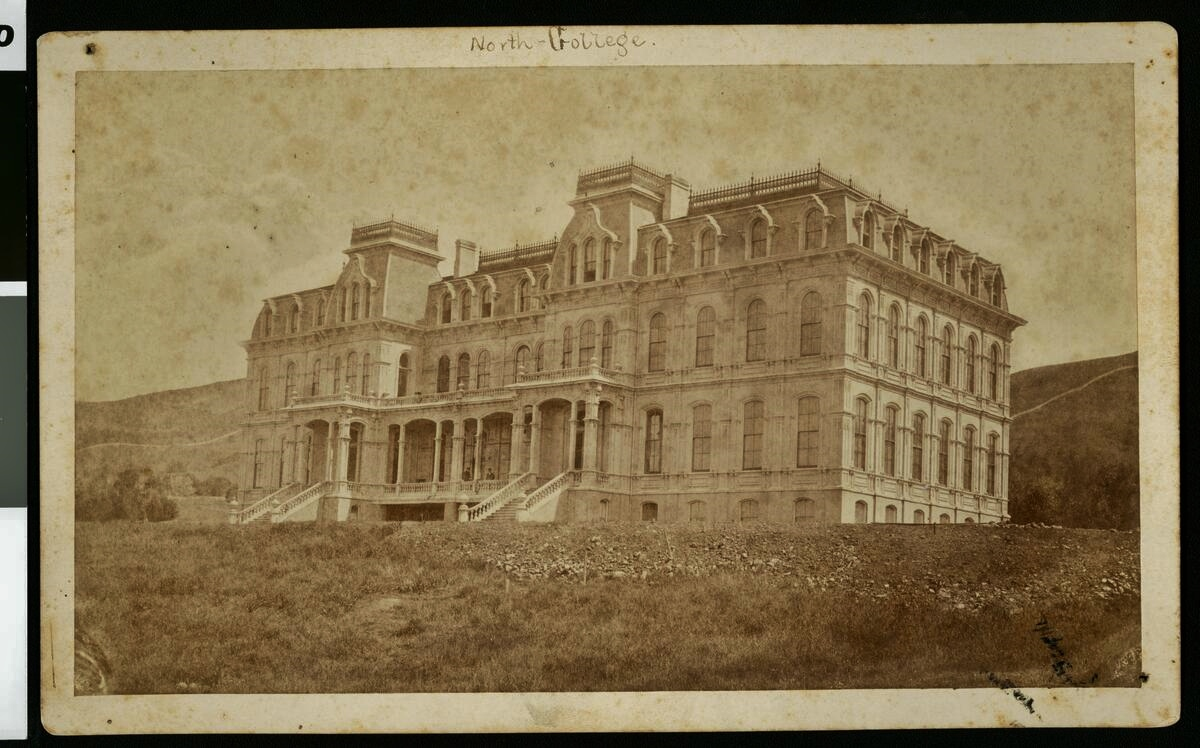
North Hall, University of California, Berkeley, ca.1879, no longer standing

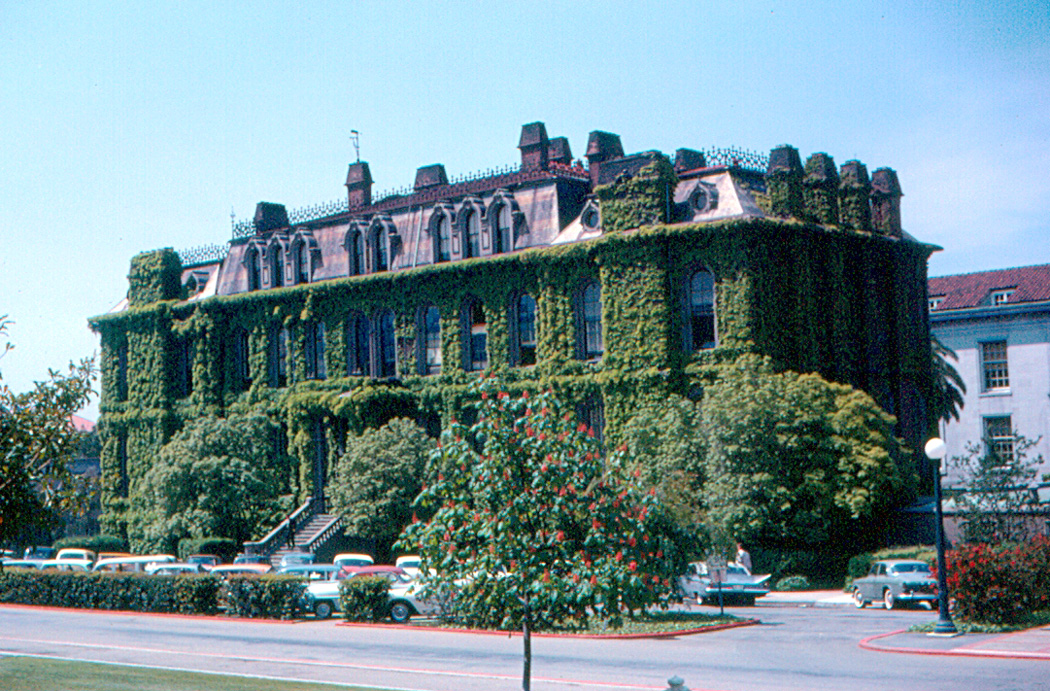
South Hall, oldest extant building, University of California, Berkeley.

With the completion of North and South Halls in 1873, the university relocated to its Berkeley location with 167 male and 22 female students.

In 1874, the first woman graduated from the University of California; Rosa L. Scrivner earned a Ph.B in Agriculture. Elizabeth Bragg, the first woman to receive a degree in Civil Engineering from an American university, earned her degree at Berkeley in 1876.

In 1881, Henry Douglas Bacon donated books and art work from his personal collection and funded the construction of Bacon Hall, a library and art museum.

Financed by a bequest from California land baron James Lick, the university's first research facility, an observatory on Mount Hamilton, began operations in 1888.

Starting in 1891, Phoebe Apperson Hearst made several large gifts to Berkeley, endowing a number of programs, sponsoring an international architectural competition, and funding the construction of Hearst Memorial Mining Building and Hearst Hall. Levi Strauss, another notable donor, endowed 28 scholarships in 1897. The following year, Cora Jane Flood gave the university some 540 acres in present-day Menlo Park and Atherton and a one-half interest in the Bear Creek Water Company, which supplied water to the donated property and its surrounds. The Flood donation would provide for the establishment of Berkeley's business school, then the College of Commerce and now the Haas School, in 1898. It would be the country's first business school at a public university.

== 20th century ==
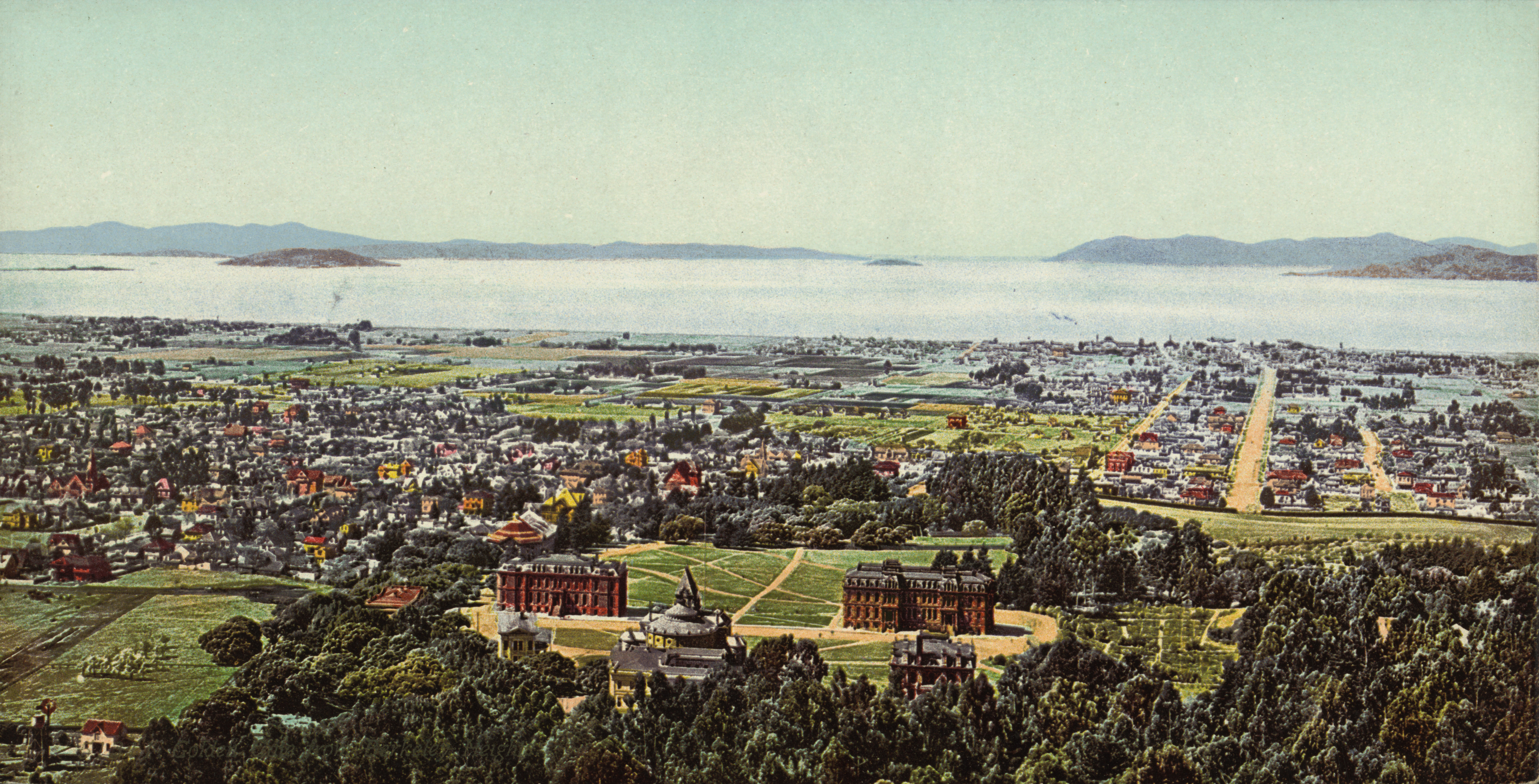
Postcard of Berkeley campus, circa 1900

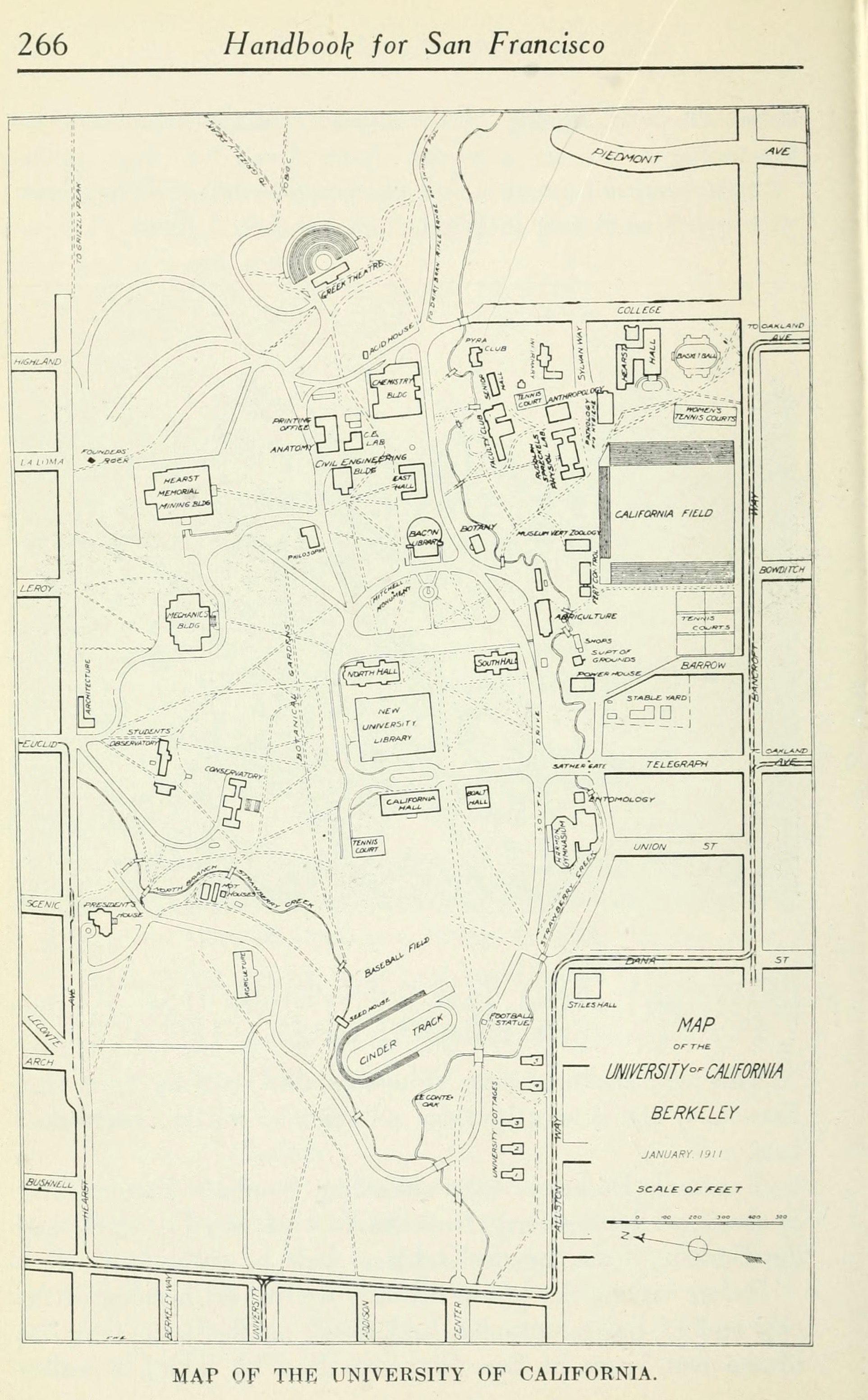
Campus map 1914

The university came of age under the direction of Benjamin Ide Wheeler, who served as its president from 1899 to 1919.

In 1905, the "University Farm" was formed near Sacramento, ultimately becoming the University of California, Davis.

Berkeley's reputation grew as President Wheeler succeeded in attracting renowned faculty to the campus and procuring research and scholarship funds.

The campus began to take on the look of a proper university with the completion of several Beaux-Arts and neoclassical buildings, including California Memorial Stadium (1923), designed by architect John Galen Howard; these buildings form the core of Berkeley's present campus architecture.

In the 1910s, Berkeley played a significant role in the Indian Independence Movement. Beyond the reach of the British colonial police, Indian students studying at the university helped form the Ghadar Party and published its paper, the Hindustan Ghadar.

In 1928, John D. Rockefeller Jr. funded the International House Berkeley, which officially opened on August 18, 1930. One of three such residences in country dedicated to international students – the first was established at Columbia University in the City of New York and the second at the University of Chicago—it was the largest student housing complex in the Bay Area and the first coeducational residence west of the Mississippi.

Robert Gordon Sproul became president in 1930, and during his 28-year tenure, Berkeley gained international recognition as a major research university. Prior to taking office, Sproul took a six-month tour of other universities and colleges to study their educational and administrative methods and to establish connections through which he could draw talented faculty in the future. The Great Depression and World War II led to funding cutbacks, but Sproul was able to maintain academic and research standards by campaigning for private funds. By 1942, the American Council on Education ranked Berkeley second only to Harvard University in the number of distinguished departments.

As a land-grant university subject to the Morrill Act of 1862, male undergraduates were required to serve two hours per week for four years being trained in tactics, dismounted drill, marksmanship, camp duty, military engineering, and fortifications. In exchange for California's share of 150,000 acres (61,000 ha), North Hall housed an armory. In 1904, the service requirement was reduced to two years, and in 1917, Berkeley's ROTC unit was established. The university president's report from 1902 states, "The University Cadets from last year numbered no less than 866. Appointments as second lieutenants in the regular army have been conferred upon several men who have distinguished themselves as officers in the University Cadets. It is very much to be hoped that the War Department will establish permanently the policy of offering such appointments to the graduates of each year who show the highest ability in military pursuits." Commander Chester W. Nimitz established the Naval ROTC at Berkeley in the fall of 1926. Transferred in June 1929, Captain Nimitz left a unit of 150 midshipmen with a staff of six commissioned and six petty officers. Berkeley has produced 36 general and flag officers of the United States Armed Forces.

=== World War II ===
During World War II, Ernest Orlando Lawrence's Radiation Laboratory in the hills above Berkeley began to contract with the U.S. Army to develop the atomic bomb, which would involve Berkeley's cutting-edge research in nuclear physics, including Glenn Seaborg's then-secret discovery of plutonium (Room 307 of Gilman Hall, where Seaborg discovered plutonium, would later be a National Historic Landmark). Berkeley physics professor J. Robert Oppenheimer was named scientific head of the Manhattan Project in 1942. Along with the descendant of the Radiation Lab, the Lawrence Berkeley National Laboratory, the University of California originally managed and is now a partner in managing two other labs of similar age, Los Alamos National Laboratory and Lawrence Livermore National Laboratory, which were established in 1943 and 1952, respectively.

From 1943 to 1946, Berkeley was one of 131 colleges and universities that took part in the V-12 Navy College Training Program. The military increased its presence on campus to produce officers, with the army program commandeering Bowles Hall and the naval program taking control of the International House, the Student Co-op Barrington Hall, and several fraternities. By 1944, more than 1,000 navy personnel were studying at Cal, roughly one out of every four male Berkeley students. Former secretary of defense Robert McNamara and former Army chief of staff Frederick C. Weyand were both graduates of Berkeley's ROTC program. With the end of the war and the subsequent rise of student activism, the board of regents succumbed to pressure from the student government and ended compulsory military training at Berkeley in 1962.

=== 1950s ===
In 1949, the Board of Regents adopted an anti-communist loyalty oath to be signed by all University of California employees. Several faculty members, including eminent comparative psychologist Edward C. Tolman, objected to the oath requirement and were dismissed; ten years passed before they were reinstated with back pay. An oath to "support and defend the Constitution of the United States and the Constitution of the State of California against all enemies, foreign and domestic" is still required of university employees who are American citizens.

Prior to 1952, Berkeley was the University of California, and university locations outside of Berkeley were considered remote departments. However, in March 1951, the University of California began to reorganize itself into a university system, with each semi-autonomous campus having its own chief executive, a chancellor, who would, in turn, report to the university president. After the reorganization was formalized in 1952, Sproul remained in office as president, and Clark Kerr became Berkeley's first Chancellor. After Kerr became president in 1957, Berkeley, once simply the "University of California", officially became the "University of California, Berkeley", its name now often shortened to "Berkeley" in general reference or in an academic context (www.berkeley.edu, Berkeley Law, Berkeley Haas) or to "California" or "Cal", particularly when referring to its athletic teams (California Golden Bears).

In 1952, Joseph T. Gier was appointed associate professor of electrical engineering, and he is believed to be the first African-American faculty member.

In 1958, a faculty committee, first chaired by Professor Otto Struve and then by Professor Edward Teller, recommended the establishment of a laboratory dedicated to emerging rocket and satellite technology. The Regents, acting on the recommendation of Chancellor Glenn T. Seaborg and President Clark Kerr, authorized the formation of the Space Sciences Laboratory in 1959. Located in the Berkeley Hills overlooking the central campus, the Space Sciences Laboratory would go on to make important scientific contributions to many NASA programs.

=== 1960s ===
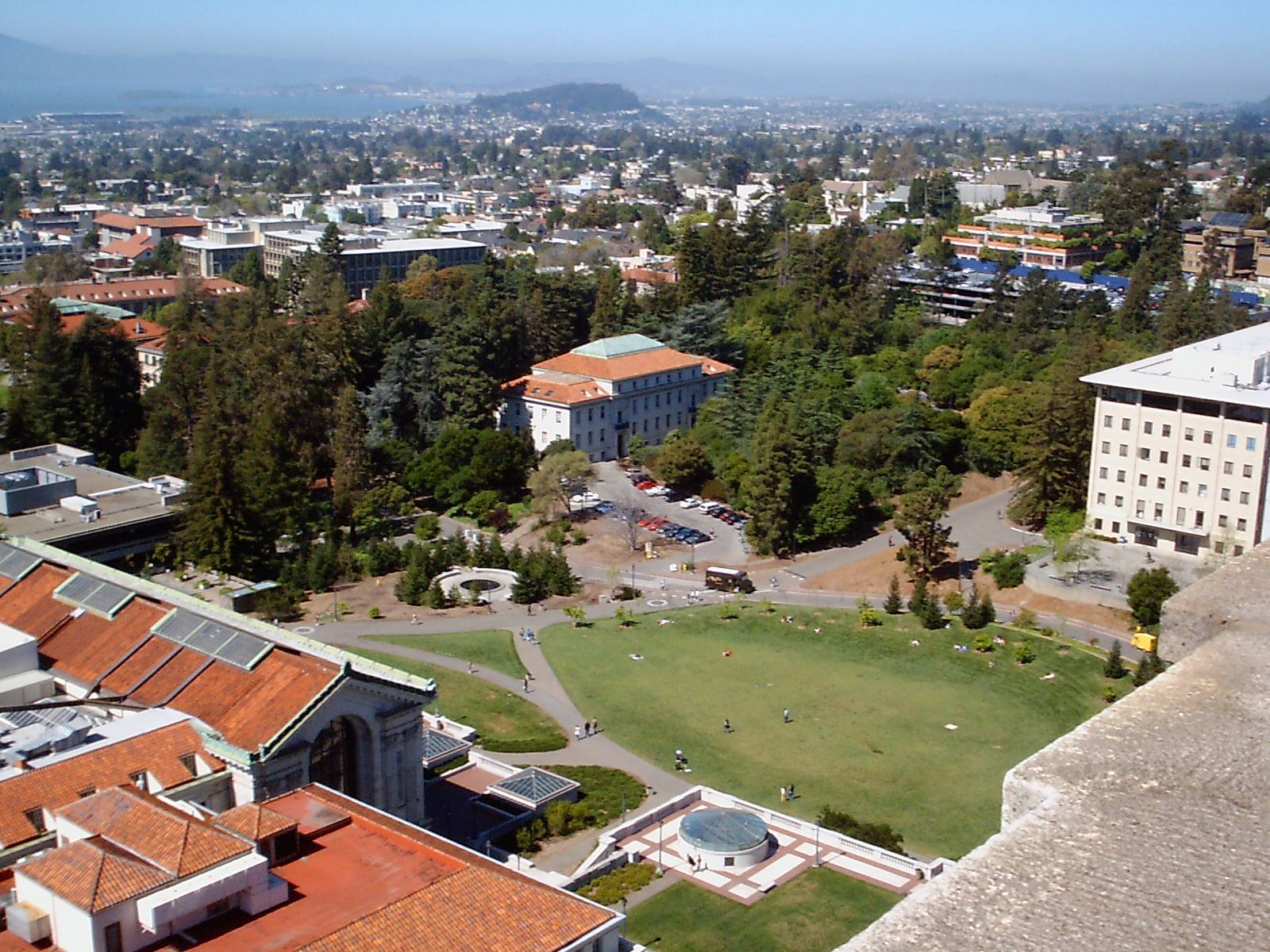
Memorial Glade, at the center of the Berkeley campus

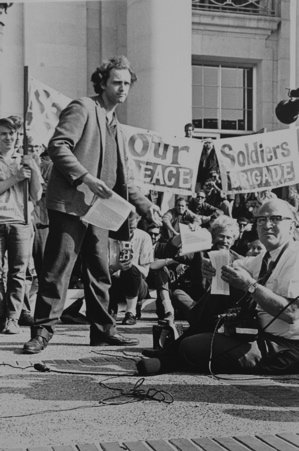
Mario Savio on Sproul Hall steps, 1966

In the 1960s Berkeley gained a worldwide reputation for political activism, beginning with the student-led Free Speech Movement. By tradition and given its proximity to the highly-trafficked main entrance to the university, Sproul Plaza had been, and continues to be, an area for public speeches and similar activities, much like Speakers' Corner in London's Hyde Park. However, in 1964, the university administration banned political activity on campus. On October 1, 1964, Jack Weinberg, who the previous year had graduated magna cum laude from Berkeley with a degree in mathematics, was arrested while manning a Campus CORE booth in Sproul Plaza, prompting a series of student-led acts of formal remonstrance and civil disobedience that ultimately gave rise to the Free Speech Movement. The movement would ultimately prevail and serve as precedent for student opposition to America’s involvement in the Vietnam War.

University president Clark Kerr would later write that of all the chancellors with whom he had worked, Roger W. Heyns, who served as Berkeley's chancellor from 1965 to 1971, had the most "tormenting" assignment of all.

During this era, the most publicized event was the 1969 protest over People's Park, a conflict between the university and a number of Berkeley students and city residents over a plot of land on which the university had intended to construct athletic fields. A grassroots effort by students and residents turned it into a community park, but after a few weeks, the university decided to reclaim control over the property. Law enforcement was sent in and the park was bulldozed, setting off a protest. California governor Ronald Reagan—who had promised during his gubernatorial election campaign that he would address the so-called unruliness at Berkeley and other university campuses—called in National Guard troops, and the violence that followed resulted in over a dozen hospitalizations and the death of one student. Ever since, People's Park has been used as a community park. On May 8, 2018, the university announced plans to build student housing on the site and to make a portion of the land available for permanent supportive housing.

== Present day ==
Today, Berkeley students are considered to be less politically active than their predecessors, and the city has seen higher increases in liberalism than has the campus. However, Berkeley students have become more liberal. In a poll conducted in 2005, 51% of Berkeley freshmen considered themselves liberal, 37% considered themselves moderate, and 12% identified as conservative. 43.8% have no religious preference compared to a national average of 17.6%. In 1982, 20.8% identified as conservative, 32.9% identified as liberals, and 46.4% identified as moderate. Although Republicans are in the minority, the Berkeley College Republicans is the largest political organization on campus. Democrats outnumber Republicans on the faculty by a ratio of nine to one, leading to some conservative student criticism of the faculty for teaching with a liberal bias. However, on the whole, Democrats outnumber Republicans on American university campuses by a ratio of 10:1.

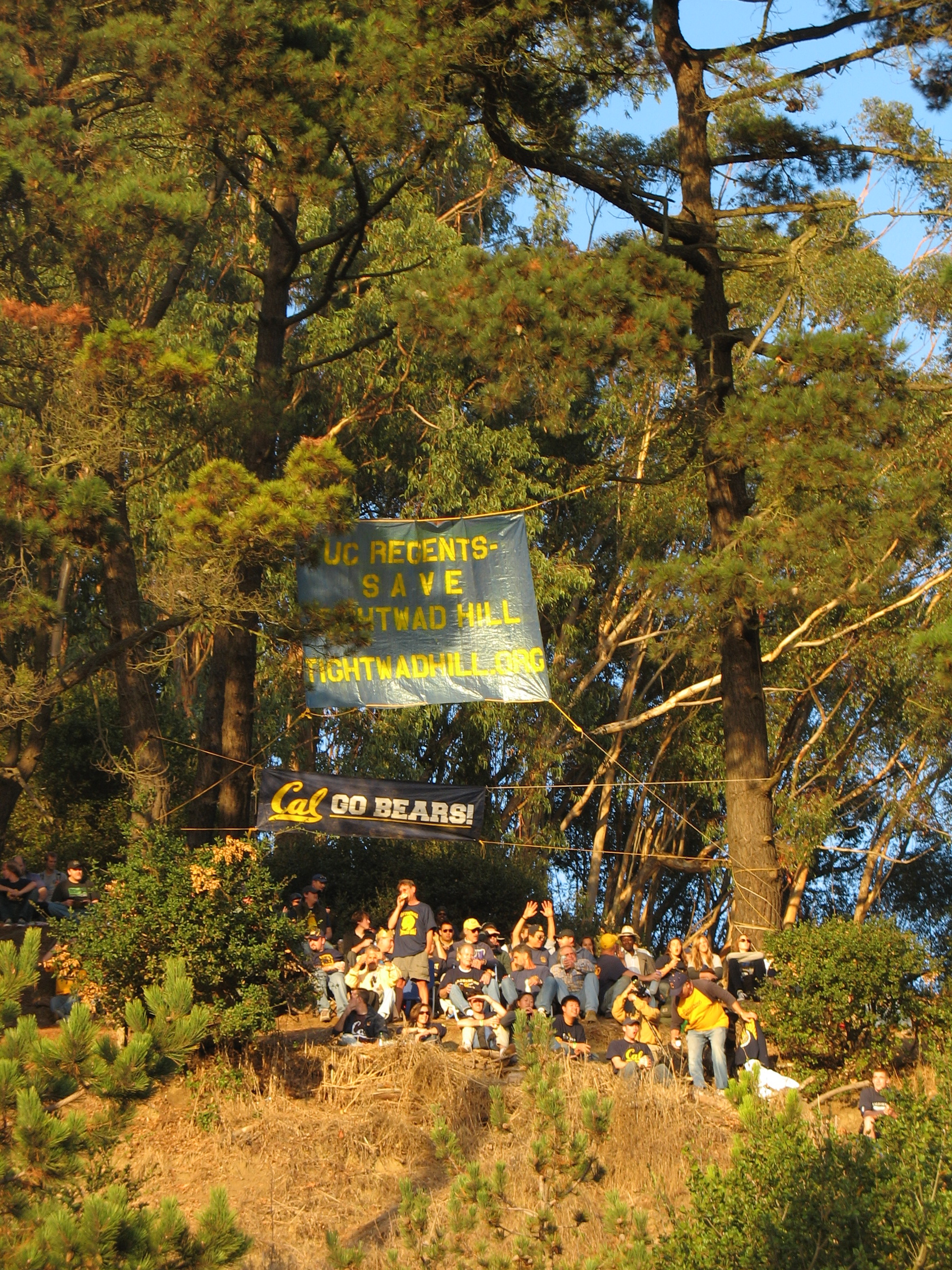
Tightwad Hill

Although considered a liberal institution by some, various human and animal rights groups have protested the research conducted at Berkeley. Native American groups contend that the university's dismantling of the Phoebe A. Hearst Museum of Anthropology's repatriation unit demonstrates unwillingness to comply with the Native American Graves Protection and Repatriation Act, while Berkeley officials say the museum's reorganization complies with the law and will involve all museum staff in the repatriation process. Animal-rights activists have taken to committing various acts of vandalism and intimidation against faculty members whose research involves the use of animals. Additionally, the university's response to a group of tree sitters protesting the construction of a new athletic center has galvanized some members of the local community, including the city council, against the university. Plans to renovate Memorial Stadium in a way that would eliminate a view of the field from the surrounding hills also have encountered opposition from alumni and others who have regularly watched Cal football games for free.

As of 2006, the 32,347-student university needed more capital investment just to maintain current infrastructure than any other campus in the UC system, but as its enrollment is at capacity, it often receives less state money for improvement projects than other, growing campuses in the system. As state funding for higher education declines, Berkeley has increasingly turned to private sources to maintain basic research programs. In 2007, the oil giant BP donated $500 million to Berkeley and the University of Illinois at Urbana-Champaign to establish a joint research laboratory to develop biofuels, the Hewlett Foundation gave $113 million to endow 100 faculty chairs, and Dow Chemical gave $10 million for a research program in sustainability to be overseen by a Dow executive.

The 2010 United States National Research Council Rankings identified UC Berkeley as having the highest number of top-ranked doctoral programs in the nation. Berkeley doctoral programs that received a #1 ranking included Agricultural and Resource Economics, Astrophysics, Chemistry, Civil and Environmental Engineering, Computer Science, Electrical Engineering, English, Epidemiology, Geography, German, Mathematics, Mechanical Engineering, Biochemistry and Molecular Biology, Genetics, Genomics, and Development, Physics, Plant Biology, and Political Science. Berkeley was also the #1 recipient of National Science Foundation Graduate Research Fellowships between 2001 and 2010, with 1,333 awards.

=== BP deal ===
The $500 million ten-year contract between Berkeley, the Lawrence Berkeley Laboratory, the University of Illinois at Urbana–Champaign and BP (formerly BP Amoco), one of the world's largest energy production companies, officially went into effect Wednesday November 14, 2007 following approval by a majority of the faculty. The grant is the largest in the university's history. The deal has garnered criticism from some students and faculty who claim the agreement was negotiated in secret, and that it threatens Berkeley's reputation as an autonomous and democratic institution of higher learning. Supporters of the deal, on the other hand, assert that the infusion of capital from the venture will benefit the campus as a whole at a time when public universities are dealing with increasing cuts in State and Federal funding. They also point out that the BP deal focuses on developing alternative energy, an important issue in today's world.

Nuclear physicist and BP Chief Scientist Steve Koonin began the process that led to BP's selection of Berkeley as a co-recipient of the grant. Berkeley faculty and graduate students will aid BP scientists in designing and implementing genetically modified plants and microbes which can be used in the Bio-fuel industry. The deal is controversial among some Berkeley faculty, with some professors including Ignacio Chapela and Miguel Altieri who claim that the project will displace farmland needed for food crops in poor nations and replace them with patented crops owned by multinational corporations, and others including Randy Schekman speaking out in support of the deal.

In March 2007 the UC Regents, who signed the deal, voted to build a new research facility to house the Energy Biosciences Institute (EBI), BP's chosen name for the project. University officials describe it as "the first public-private institution of this scale in the world".

== Names ==
At the time of its founding, Berkeley was the first full-curriculum public university in the state of California and thus was known as the University of California. As occurred in other states with only a single major public university, University of California was frequently shortened to California or Cal, for ease of identification. Because the school's long sports tradition stretches back to an era before the founding of the other University of California branches, its athletic teams continue to be designated as California Golden Bears, Cal Bears, or simply, Cal. Andrew Gabrielson, a trustee of the College of California at its beginning, suggested that the college be named in honor of the Anglo-Irish philosopher George Berkeley.

As a reflection of the University of California's development into a multi-institutional university system, the term University of California is no longer applied to the campus outside of varsity sports; the official name is University of California, Berkeley. Informally, the campus is called UC Berkeley, Berkeley, or Cal. More specifically, the campus uses the terms in the following ways:

- "UC Berkeley" is the standard brand name for communications to the general public. The university's current brand identity standards call for "UC Berkeley" to be used in the first reference in any communication.
- "Berkeley" is used in further references in any document in which "UC Berkeley" is used. In addition, according to the campus, "Berkeley is the academic expression of our brand and is used by colleges, schools and departments in official communications."
- "Cal", according to the campus, "is the social expression and pet name for Berkeley. It is used by Cal Athletics, Cal Alumni Association and by development, student organizations and licensed products".

The term University of California has come to refer to the entire University of California system. The campus office for trademarks disallows the use of Cal Berkeley, though it is occasionally used colloquially. Unlike most University of California campuses, which are commonly known by their initials, usage of UCB is discouraged (as is University of California at Berkeley, except in instances where use of the comma would cause confusion), and the domain name is berkeley.edu. While ucb.edu and ucberkeley.edu are also registered by the school, they are not actively used.
