= Chatman =

Chatman is a surname. Notable people with the surname include:

- Antonio Chatman (born 1979), American football wide receiver and punt returner
- Charles Chatman (born 1961), wrongfully convicted American
- Elijah Chatman (born 2000), American football player
- Jesse Chatman (born 1979), American football running back
- Mire Chatman (born 1978), American basketball player
- Pokey Chatman (born 1969), American, former head coach of the LSU Lady Tigers basketball team
- Seymour Chatman (1928–2015), American literary and film critic
- Vernon Chatman (born c. 1972), American television producer, writer, voice actor, stand-up comedian, musician
