= Maura O'Neill =

American government official (born 1956)

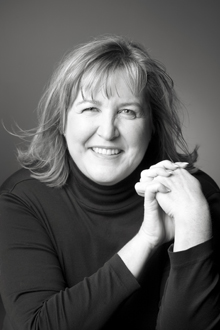

Chief of Innovation at the Agency for International Development
- In office 2009–2013
- President: Barack Obama
- Secretary: Hillary Clinton

Personal details
- Born: September 6, 1956 (age 70) San Francisco, California, United States
- Spouse: Vaho Rebassoo
- Education: University of Washington, Seattle; University of California at Berkeley; Columbia
- Website: www.mauraoneill.com

Maura O'Neill (born September 6, 1956) served as the First Chief of Innovation and was a Senior Counselor to the Administrator in January 2009 at the United States Agency for International Development. She is currently a Distinguished Teaching Fellow in the Lester Center for Entrepreneurship and Innovation at the University of California, Berkeley, Haas School of Business.

While at USAID, O'Neill co-led USAID Forward, the global initiative to reform foreign assistance. She adapted venture capital and drug discovery methods to drive faster, cheaper, and more sustainable solutions to global governance, health, food security, and economic growth. Co-creating the Development Innovation Ventures (DIV), it attracted partnerships with the Bill and Melinda Gates Foundation, the Skoll Foundation and later its offshoot, the Global Innovation Fund, with UK, Sweden, and Australia AID agencies, and Omidyar Network. She also co-created Development Innovation Ventures, now the Global Innovation Fund, which has received 6,000 applicants since 2010.

Before USAID, she served as the Senior Advisor of Energy and Climate and Chief of Staff for the Under Secretary at the United States Department of Agriculture. There, she authored President Obama's Biofuels Strategy. Between 2008 and 2009, she served as the Chief of Staff for United States Senator Maria Cantwell.

== Career ==
O'Neill founded four companies in the fields of electricity efficiency, smart grid and customer information systems and billing, e-commerce and digital education. In 1989, she was named the Greater Seattle Business Person of the Year.

In 2008, O'Neill helped found the Baltimore Leadership School for Young Women.

From 1982 to 1995, O'Neill founded her first company, O'Neill & Company, advising electric utilities on energy efficiency and helping launch one of the largest curbside recycling programs in the country. In 1992, she served as Chairwoman of the Washington State Women's Political Caucus. O'Neill also advised policymakers on innovation and large-scale consumer adoption.

In 1996, O'Neill was the president and CEO of ConnexT, a software company that served the deregulated energy market She later became a delegate to the Advanced Study Institute of NATO on the utility industry.

Later, O'Neill created Improvemybusiness.com, a company designed to help small businesses through the Internet.

In 2003, O'Neill became the CEO of Explore Life, a public-private company to improve Seattle's life sciences industry and increase the region's rate of commercial research.

== Faculty ==
In 2021, O'Neill was the program facilitator and lecturer of the Blockchain Technology program at Berkely Haas School of Business.

In 2009, O'Neill went to work at USAID. She co-led the institution of USAID Forward - the agency's major reform initiative under President Obama. O'Neill led the agency's move to incorporate more public-private partnerships as a key component for effective development. She led the IDEA (Innovative Development through Entrepreneurship Acceleration) project. O'Neill was named the First Chief of Innovation and a Senior Counselor to the Administrator in January 2009 at the United States Agency for International Development.

== Early life and education ==
O'Neill was raised in the San Francisco Bay Area and moved to Seattle in 1975, where she studied environmental studies at the University of Washington. She later received MBAs from Columbia University and the University of California, Berkeley and a doctorate from the University of Washington.

O'Neill lives in Seattle, Washington with her husband, with whom she has two children.

Political offices	Chief of Innovation Agency for International Development; 2009–2013	Incumbent
