= Haas School of Business =

Business school of UC Berkeley

Coordinates: 37°52′18.06″N 122°15′12.84″W

University of California, Berkeley Haas School of Business
- Other name: Walter A. Haas School of Business
- Motto: New Thinking for the New Economy
- Type: Public business school
- Established: 1898
- Parent institution: University of California, Berkeley
- Accreditation: AACSB International
- Dean: Jennifer Chatman
- Faculty: 241
- Students: ~2,500
- Undergraduates: ~700
- Postgraduates: ~1,730
- Doctoral students: ~70
- Location: Berkeley, California, United States
- Website: haas.berkeley.edu

The Haas School of Business (branded as Berkeley Haas) is the business school of the University of California, Berkeley, a public research university in Berkeley, California. It was the first business school at a public university in the United States.

Named after Walter A. Haas, the school is housed in four buildings surrounding a central courtyard on the southeastern corner of the Berkeley campus, where both undergraduate and graduate students attend classes. Its resident startup incubator, Berkeley SkyDeck, is located west of campus in downtown Berkeley. Notable faculty include former chairs of the Federal Reserve and the Council of Economic Advisors, Nobel laureates in economics, the secretary of the treasury, the chief economist of Google, and more.

== History ==
The Haas School of Business was first established as the College of Commerce of the University of California in 1898. As enacted on March 23, 1868, the university's Organic Act listed among its goals the provision of "special courses of instruction" for many kinds of "professions," including "commerce." University Regents Arthur Rodgers, A.S. Hallidie and George T. Marye Jr. later proposed the establishment of a College of Commerce. The new college was founded on September 13, 1898, when Cora Jane Flood, daughter of industrialist and University of California Regent James C. Flood, donated land (worth one million dollars at the time) to the university specifically to support the study of commerce. The school was one of the first business schools in the United States and the first at a public university.

The college's first faculty members included some American pioneers in the field of business. Simon Litman taught the first course in marketing between 1902 and 1908. Adolph Miller, who was the Flood Professor of the Political Economy and Commerce from 1903 to 1915, later served on the first Board of Governors of the Federal Reserve System. Wesley Clair Mitchell, who taught at Berkeley from 1905 to 1913, is known as the father of the business cycle analysis. Charles Staehling taught accounting at the college from 1921 to 1951 and was known for adding a theoretical framework to the praxis-oriented teaching of accounting principles. Henry Mowbray, who taught from 1910 to 1948, wrote the first college textbook on insurance.

The College of Commerce was founded in the liberal arts tradition, drawing on faculty from other disciplines on campus. Carl C. Plehn was appointed the first dean of the new college in 1898. Plehn, a finance professor educated in Germany, drafted the college's first curriculum for a Bachelor of Science degree. The initial course offerings covered legal studies, political studies, political economy, and historical studies, including The History of the Institution of Private Property, History and Principles of Commercial Ethics, and the History of Commerce in All Countries and at Every Age. Plehn proposed changes to the curriculum in 1915 to give it a more professional focus. The proposal, adopted after World War I, established a program that included two years of liberal arts education followed by junior and senior year commerce study, a pattern still used for the undergraduate program today.

Henry Rand Hatfield, a pioneer in accounting and an early entrant in the Accounting Hall of Fame, became the second dean of the college in 1916. Hatfield had been hired by the University of California in 1904 as the first full-time accounting professor in the country. Hatfield played a leading role in the founding of the Association to Advance Collegiate Schools of Business and the national honor society Beta Gamma Sigma. He also published the first paper in the United States on accounting theory. As dean, Hatfield sought to increase the reputation of the College of Commerce by bringing scholars from the East Coast to teach during summer sessions.

After World War I, enrollment experienced an increase from the influx of veterans and continued to grow even through the Great Depression, increasing from its initial class size of three in 1898 to 1,540 students in 1938. In 1925, the college's third dean, Stuart Daggett, instituted a two-year Master of Science degree. The school's fourth dean, Henry Francis Grady, was appointed in 1928. Grady went on leave from 1934 to 1936 to become an advisor to President Franklin D. Roosevelt, for whom he worked on reciprocal trade agreements (see Reciprocal Tariff Act). The fifth dean, Robert Calkins, succeeded Grady, but left within a few years to become the dean of the Columbia Business School.

E.T. Grether was appointed the sixth dean of the College of Commerce in 1941. Grether's twenty-year tenure as dean was a time of great change. The college was renamed the Department of Business Administration in 1942 and began offering a new two-year upper division curriculum leading to the Bachelor of Science in Business Administration. In 1943, the department was renamed the School of Business Administration when it began offering a one-year graduate program.

Grether opened several research centers in the school, including The Institute for Business and Economics Research (1941), The Institute for Industrial Relations (IIR) (1945, now called the Institute for Research on Labor and Employment), and the Center for Real Estate and Urban Economics (1950). Grether tapped Clark Kerr to be the first director of the IIR. Kerr's success in this position led to his becoming the first Chancellor of the University of California, Berkeley.

The Graduate School of Business Administration was opened in 1955 and the school began offering a course of study leading to the Master of Business Administration. A year later the Doctor of Philosophy in Business Administration and executive education programs were founded.

Under the school's eighth dean, Richard H. Holton, an evening MBA program was initiated in 1972. Unlike other evening or part-time programs in the country, students were required to meet the same admission requirements as established for the day-time MBA program. Classes for the evening MBA were held in downtown San Francisco until the school's present building complex was completed in 1995, the final design of architect Charles Moore.

Earl F. Cheit became the ninth dean of the school in 1976. Facing diminishing funding and budget pressures, Cheit lobbied and won increased salary scales for business faculty. He also secured donations from Walter A. Haas to endow seven new chairs and to open a career planning and placement center. In 1980, the school began to offer a Management of Technology program jointly with the College of Engineering. 1980 also saw the inauguration of the annual Haas Competition in Business and Social Policy, funded by a donation from the Evelyn and Walter A. Haas, Jr. Foundation.

In 1987, the tenth dean of the school, Raymond Miles, began the school's first major capital campaign to raise money for a new building. Major contributions were made by Wells Fargo and Eugene Trefethen, an executive with Kaiser Industries. In 1989, the Walter and Elise Haas Fund donated $15 million to the building campaign. The donation was the largest in the history of the university to that date. The school was renamed the Haas School of Business in honor of that gift.

The new building was designed by Charles W. Moore, former chair of Berkeley's Department of Architecture. Construction began in 1993 and the school moved into its new building complex in January 1995.

Laura Tyson, a professor at Berkeley since 1977 and the chairman of the President's Council of Economic Advisers from 1993 to 1995 during the Clinton Administration, was the dean of the school from 1998 to 2001. Tyson negotiated an agreement with the Columbia Business School to create a joint program, the Berkeley-Columbia Executive MBA, which offered experienced executives the opportunity to earn an MBA from both Haas and Columbia. The program lasted for ten years.

Tom Campbell served as dean of Berkeley Haas from 2002 to 2008, with the exception of a one-year sabbatical in 2004-2005 during which he served as Director of the California Department of Finance. During this time, Richard Lyons served as interim dean.

In July 2008, Richard Lyons became the dean of Berkeley Haas. Along with a curriculum overhaul, Lyons launched the public phase of a $300 million capital campaign. The campaign's stated goals are "transforming the... campus, building a curriculum based on the Berkeley Haas approach to leadership, and aggressively expanding the school’s faculty and its support for research." Dean Lyons also oversaw the opening of Berkeley Haas' fourth building, Connie & Kevin Chou Hall. A six-story, 80,000 sq.ft. building on the north side of the Berkeley Haas campus, Chou Hall cost $60 million and was funded exclusively by alumni and community members. It is the first academic building in the country to be designed for LEED Platinum and WELL certifications, and intended to achieve zero waste certification by summer 2018. Chou Hall opened under temporary occupancy in summer 2017 and was officially completed in 2018.

Ann Harrison began her term as Berkeley Haas dean in January 2019. In July 2024 Harrison stepped down as dean of Berkeley Haas and Jennifer Chatman was named interim Dean.

The Haas School of Business has been home to two winners of the Nobel Memorial Prize in Economics. John C. Harsanyi (1920–2000) was a co-recipient with John Nash and Reinhard Selten in 1994 for his contributions to the study of game theory and its application to economics. Oliver Williamson (1932-2020) was a co-recipient with Elinor Ostrom in 2009 for his "analysis of economic governance, especially the boundaries of the firm." Both have served as Professor Emeritus at Berkeley Haas and in Berkeley's Department of Economics.

== Academics ==
=== Graduate programs ===
==== Full-time MBA ====
The Berkeley MBA Program is a two-year curriculum designed to prepare students for business leadership. In addition to its core curriculum and elective courses, Berkeley Haas requires all MBA students to take an Applied Innovation course, such as Haas@Work or International Business Development.

Prospective full-time MBA students may apply to one of three concurrent degree programs; Haas offers a four-semester MBA/MEng program with one of seven programs in the College of Engineering, a five-semester MBA/MPH program with the School of Public Health, and a four-year JD/MBA program with Berkeley Law or the UC College of the Law in San Francisco. Current students may apply to a semester-long exchange program with Columbia Business School, Hong Kong University of Science and Technology, IESE Business School, HEC Paris, or London Business School.

==== Evening & Weekend MBA ====
The three-year, part-time Berkeley Evening & Weekend MBA Program allows participants to continue working full-time while pursuing the MBA. The curriculum is aligned with that of the full-time MBA, and students can choose to attend core classes either two evenings per week or all day on Saturdays. Students can also choose to attend core classes in-person or a hybrid of online and in-person (Flex Cohort).

==== MBA for Executives ====
The Berkeley MBA for Executives program lasts 19 months and consists of courses taught by the full-time faculty of Berkeley Haas. The core curriculum is taught during the first three terms, and the last two terms offer elective courses. Upon completion of the program, students earn the same degree awarded in the school's other MBA programs.

Prior to 2013, Berkeley Haas offered the Berkeley-Columbia Executive MBA, which gave experienced executives the opportunity to jointly earn MBAs from both Haas and Columbia Business School.

==== Master of Financial Engineering Program ====
The Berkeley Master of Financial Engineering (MFE) Program provides graduates with knowledge and skills necessary for a career in the finance industry. Students in the MFE program take an integrated set of courses for a period of one year, and must also complete a ten-week internship or on-site project plus an applied finance project that builds on skills learned in the internship.

==== PhD Program ====
The Haas School of Business PhD Program offers six fields of academic study: Accounting, Business and Public Policy, Finance, Marketing, Management of Organizations, and Real Estate. The program admits 14-16 candidates per year, and students can expect to graduate in four to five years.

=== Undergraduate program ===
==== Bachelor of Science ====
The Haas School of Business, in conjunction with the main Berkeley campus, offers an undergraduate Bachelor of Science degree in Business Administration (BSBA). Students take a variety of elective courses in addition to required core courses, which include economics, communication, managerial and financial accounting, finance, marketing, and ethics. Students apply to the program after fulfilling undergraduate prerequisite courses, and are admitted to Haas for their final two years.

In July 2022, the Haas School of Business announced the Spieker Undergraduate Business Program, an expansion of its two-year undergraduate business program into a four-year program. This transformation was facilitated by the largest single donation in the school’s history, contributed by Warren “Ned” Spieker, a Berkeley alumnus with a Bachelor of Science degree in 1966, and his wife, Carol Spieker, who earned a Bachelor of Arts in Political Science in 1966. The inaugural first cohort commenced with the incoming class of 2028.

==== Additional offerings ====
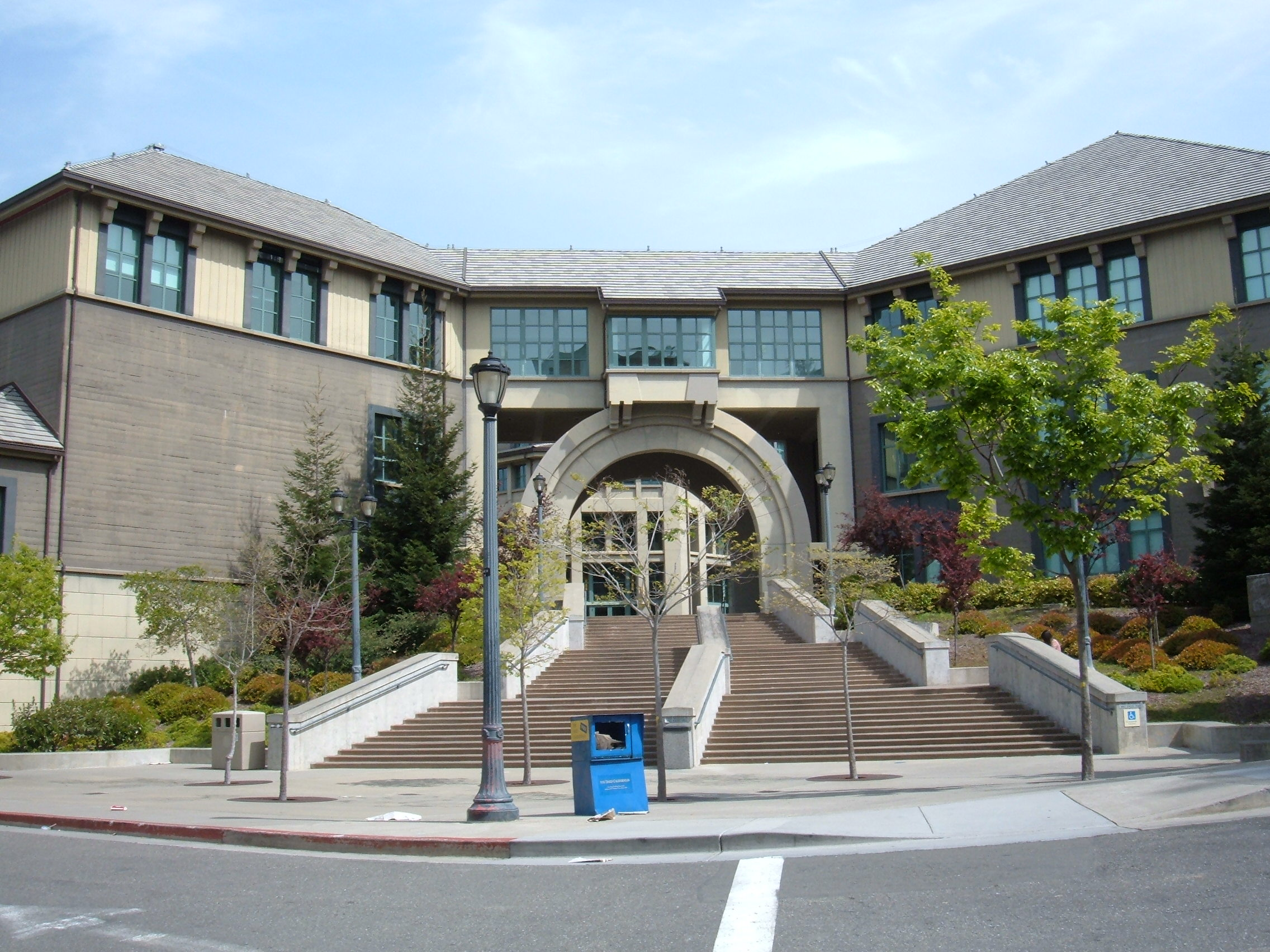
The western entrance

The Haas School of Business offers the BSBA degree with a concentration in Global Management through its Global Management Program (GMP). Starting with the Class of 2029, GMP students spend their sophomore Fall semester at the University of Ghana in Accra, through the UCEAP. Previous GMP cohorts began the program in the summer prior to their freshman year and spent their first semester in London through Berkeley Global Edge.

The Management, Entrepreneurship, & Technology program, offered by the Haas School of Business and the College of Engineering, is an integrated program that leads to two Bachelor of Science degrees, one in Business Administration from Berkeley Haas and the other in Electrical Engineering & Computer Sciences (EECS), Industrial Engineering & Operations Research (IEOR), or Mechanical Engineering (ME) from the College of Engineering. Students enter the M.E.T. program as freshmen.

The Haas School of Business also partners with the College of Engineering, College of Environmental Design, and College of Letters and Science (Arts and Humanities Division) to sponsor the undergraduate Berkeley Certificate in Design Innovation.

=== Executive education ===
UC Berkeley Executive Education offers a variety of programs for individuals and organizations, to help corporate executives understand new and/or challenging aspects of the business world. Executives can enroll in a prepared set of short courses targeted at specific issues or develop a custom curriculum.

== Institutes and centers ==
The Haas School of Business is home to many research institutions and centers, and Haas faculty members take an active part in Berkeley's multidisciplinary programs.

=== Institutes ===
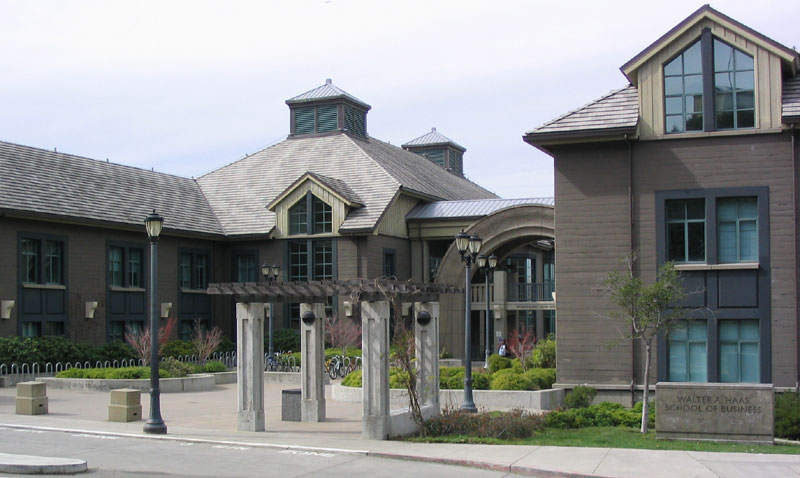
The eastern entrance, across from the California Memorial Stadium

Institute for Business Innovation (IBI)

- Fisher Center for Business Analytics
- Garwood Center for Corporate Innovation
- Berkeley Haas Entrepreneurship Program
- Tusher Center for Management of Intellectual Capital
- AMENA Center for Entrepreneurship and Development
- Haas@Work Program
- Open Innovation Labs

Institute for Business & Social Impact (IBSI)

- Center for Social Sector Leadership (CSSL)
- Center for Responsible Business (CRB)
- Center for Equity, Gender, and Leadership (EGAL)
- Berkeley Business Academy for Youth (B-BAY)
- Boost@Berkeley Haas

Energy Institute at Haas (EI)

- Cleantech to Market (C2M)

=== Centers ===
- Asia Business Center
- Berkeley Center for Economics and Politics
- Center for Financial Reporting and Management
- Fisher Center for Real Estate and Urban Economics

== Rankings ==
=== Global MBA ===
Business school rankings

United States
- QS MBA: 6
- Financial Times MBA: 3
- Bloomberg MBA: 8
- USNWR MBA: 7
- USNWR Undergraduate: 3
- THE Business: 3

Global
- QS MBA: 12
- Financial Times MBA: 9
- THE Business: 5

Berkeley Haas was ranked 19th in the Financial Times Global MBA Ranking (2024).

Berkeley Haas was ranked 13th in QS Global MBA Ranking (2024).

=== US MBA ===
Berkeley was ranked 7th (tied) in the U.S. News & World Report Best Business Schools Ranking (2024).

Berkeley was ranked 7th in the QS MBA Rankings for the US (2024).

Berkeley was ranked 10th in the Bloomberg MBA and Business School Ranking (2024).

=== Part Time MBA ===
The Berkeley Haas Evening & Weekend MBA Program was ranked 1st in U.S. News & World Report's Best Part-time MBA Programs (2025).

=== Undergraduate ===
The Haas School of Business Undergraduate Program was tied for 2nd in U.S. News & World Report's Best Undergraduate Business Programs (2024).

== Notable faculty ==
- David Aaker – Professor Emeritus of Marketing Strategy; current Vice Chairman of the Prophet, creator of the Aaker Model, and 2015 Marketing Hall of Fame Inductee
- Vinod Aggarwal – Professor of Political Science; current Director of the Berkeley APEC Study Center, and founding member of the U.S. Asia Pacific Council
- Steve Blank – Lecturer; creator of Customer development, part of the Lean Startup methodology
- Henry Chesbrough – Adjunct Professor and Faculty Director of the Garwood Center for Corporate Innovation; known for coining the term Open Innovation
- Solomon Darwin – Director of the Garwood Center for Corporate Innovation and Executive Director of the Center for Growth Markets; known for his development of "smart village" frameworks for Indian villages
- Henry F. Grady – Dean of the Berkeley's College of Commerce, now the Haas School of Business (1928-1937); former President of the American President Lines, and former U.S. Ambassador to India, Nepal, Greece, and Iran
- Paul Gertler — Professor of Economics; former Chief Economist of the World Bank Human Development Network
- John Harsanyi – Professor Emeritus; 1994 Economics Nobel Laureate
- Ross Levine – Professor; economist and advisor to the World Bank, Federal Reserve, and the International Monetary Fund (IMF)
- Daniel Levitin – Distinguished Faculty Fellow; neuroscientist, best-selling author, and management consultant
- Richard Lyons – Professor of Economics and Finance; former Dean of the Haas School of Business (2008-2018)
- Sherman J. Maisel – Professor Emeritus; instrumental to found the Haas-Berkeley Center for Real Estate and Urban Economics, and former Member of the Federal Reserve Board of Governors
- David C. Mowery – Professor Emeritus of New Enterprise Development; advisor to U.S. Congress, and the Organization for Economic Cooperation and Development (OECD)
- Omar Romero-Hernandez – Continuing Lecturer; 2010 Franz Edelman Award recipient
- Mark Rubinstein – Finance Professor Emeritus; instrumental to found the Haas-Berkeley Master of Financial Engineering (MFE) Program, and 1995 International Association of Financial Engineers Man of The Year
- Carl Shapiro – Professor of the Graduate School and Professor of Business Strategy Emeritus; former member of the President’s Council of Economic Advisers, and former Deputy Assistant Attorney General for Economics in the U.S. Department of Justice Antitrust Division
- David Teece – Professor in Global Business and Faculty Director of the Tusher Center for The Management of Intellectual Capital
- Philip E. Tetlock – Professor; MacArthur Fellow, Russell Sage Foundation Scholar, winner of Woodrow Wilson Award, Robert E. Lane Award, and Grawemeyer Award
- Paul Tiffany – Senior Lecturer; author of business plans for Dummies
- Laura Tyson – Distinguished Professor of the Graduate School; former Dean of the Haas School of Business (1998–2001), former Dean of the London Business School, former Director of the National Economic Council, and former Chair of the President's Council of Economic Advisers
- Hal Varian – Professor Emeritus; current Chief Economist at Google, former Co-Editor of the American Economic Review
- David Vogel – Professor Emeritus of Business Ethics and Professor Emeritus of Political Science; current Editor-in-Chief of the California Management Review
- Oliver Williamson – Professor Emeritus of Business and Professor Emeritus of Economics and Law; 2009 Economics Nobel Laureate, a seminal researcher on transaction cost economics
- Janet Yellen – Professor Emeritus of Business Administration; current U.S. Secretary of the Treasury, former Chair of the Federal Reserve, former Vice Chair of the Federal Reserve, and former Chair of the President's Council of Economic Advisers

== Notable alumni ==
- Scott Adams, (MBA 86), creator of Dilbert and author
- Patrick Awuah, (MBA 99), founder of Ashesi University and 2015 Macarthur Fellow
- Marc Badain, (MBA 01), president of the Las Vegas Raiders
- Ralph Bahna, (MBA 65), chief executive officer (CEO) of Cunard Line (1980-1989), chairman of Priceline.com (2004-2013), and founder of Club Quarters
- Ramesh "Sunny" Balwani, (MBA 03), former president and chief operating officer (COO) of Theranos
- Bengt Baron, (BS 85, MBA 88), CEO of Cloetta
- Janet Bercovitz (PhD), Professor of Entrepreneurship at the Leeds School of Business at the University of Colorado, Boulder
- Richard C. Blum, (BS 59, MBA 59), founder of Blum Capital and the American Himalayan Foundation
- Amir Blumenfeld, (BS 05), comedian, writer and actor at CollegeHumor
- Tom Byers, (MBA 80, PhD 82), founder and co-director of the Stanford Technology Ventures Program; executive vice president of Symantec
- Dave Butler, (BS 1986, MBA 1990), CEO of Dimensional Fund Advisors
- Nick Caldwell, (MBA 2015), Silicon Valley executive and advocate for tech leaders of color
- Rob Chandra, (BA 88), Venture capitalist
- Henry Chesbrough, (PhD 97), chairman of the Open Innovation Center - Brazil
- Brett Cooper, (BS 21), American conservative political commentator, media personality, and actress
- Rick Cronk, (BS 65), co-owner, president of Dreyer's Grand Ice Cream
- Barbara Desoer, (MBA 77), CEO (2014-2019) and COO (2013-2014) of Citibank
- Tom Fanoe, (MBA 69), president and COO of Joe Boxer
- Donald Fisher, (BS 50), co-founder of Gap Inc.
- Laura E. Flores, (MBA 95), diplomat, Permanent Representative to the United Nations from Panama (2014-2017)
- Robert B. Ford, president and CEO of Abbott Laboratories
- Adam Foroughi, (BS 01), co-founder and CEO of AppLovin
- Michael R. Gallagher, (BS 67, MBA 68), CEO, executive director of Playtex Products (1995-2004)
- Scott Galloway, (MBA 92), founder of Prophet
- John Garamendi, (BS 66), Congressman from California, Lieutenant Governor of California (2007-2009), and U.S. Deputy Secretary of the Interior (1995-1998)
- Walter A. Haas, (BS 10), president (1928-1955) and chairman (until 1970) of Levi Strauss & Co
- Walter A. Haas Jr., (BS 37), president, CEO, and chairman of Levi Strauss & Co
- John Hanke, (MBA 96), CEO of Niantic Inc.
- Warren Hellman, (BA 55), co-founder of private equity firms Hellman & Friedman and Hellman Ferri (now Matrix Partners)
- Michael Homer, (BS 81), vice president at Netscape, founder of Kontiki
- N. W. Jasper, (MBA 71), current president and CEO of Dolby Laboratories
- Joseph Jimenez, (MBA 84), CEO of Novartis
- Daniel E. Koshland Sr., (BA) CEO of Levi Strauss & Co
- Cathie Lesjak, (MBA 86), CFO of Hewlett-Packard
- Robert Lutz, (BS 61, MBA 62), vice chairman of General Motors
- Richard Lindsey, (PhD), Head of Prime Brokerage and Clearing Services, member of the Management Committee of Bear Stearns, and chief economist at the U.S. Securities and Exchange Commission
- Richard Lyons, (BS 82), former Dean of the Haas School of Business (2008-2018)
- Michelle Maykin, (BS), advocate for minority participation in the National Marrow Donor Program
- Alex Mandl, (MBA 69), executive chairman of Gemalto
- Fernando Mendoza (BS 25), football player for the Indiana Hoosiers
- Paul Merage, (BS 66, MBA 68), co-founder of Chef America, co-inventor of Hot Pockets, and benefactor of Paul Merage School of Business at the University of California, Irvine
- Michael Milken, (BS 68), highly influential in developing the market for junk bonds (a.k.a. "high-yield debt")
- Norman Mineta, (BS 53), former U.S. Secretary of Transportation, former U.S. Secretary of Commerce, and former co-chair of the Joint Ocean Commission Initiative
- Will Mitchell, (PhD 88), Cannadian–American scholar of business
- Ryan Murphy, (BS 17), four-time Olympic gold medalist
- Takehiko Nakao, (MBA 82), ninth president of the Asian Development Bank
- Shantanu Narayen, (MBA 93), CEO of Adobe Systems
- Ikujiro Nonaka, (MBA 68, PhD 72), professor at Hitotsubashi University
- Terrance Odean, (MS 92, PhD 97), Rudd Family Foundation Professor of Finance at Haas School of Business
- Maura O'Neill, (MBA 04), chief innovation officer at USAID
- Doug Ose, (BS 77), Congressman from California
- Paul Otellini, (MBA 74), president and CEO of Intel
- Rudolph A. Peterson, (BS 25), president and CEO of Bank of America and former Administrator of the United Nations Development Programme
- John Riccitiello, (BS 81), CEO at Unity Technologies
- Paul Rice, (MBA 96), founder and CEO of Fair Trade USA
- Andrew Rudd, (MBA 76), chairman and CEO of Advisor Software
- Arun Sarin, (MBA 78), CEO (2003-2008) of Vodafone
- Peter Schiff, president and chief global strategist of Euro Pacific Capital, financial analyst, and author
- Komal Shah (art collector) (MBA), art collector, businessperson in Silicon Valley
- Weijian Shan, (PhD), Co-founder, Chairman and CEO of global investment firm PAG (2022 AUM of $50 billion)
- Pete Stark, (MBA 60), Congressman from California
- Lidia S. Stiglich, (BS 92), Associate Justice of the Supreme Court of Nevada
- Eleni Kounalakis, (MBA 92), Lieutenant Governor of California and U.S. Ambassador to Hungary (2010-2013)
- April Underwood, (MBA 07), CPO at Slack
- Rha Woong-Bae, (PhD 68), Deputy Prime Minister of South Korea and Minister of Economy and Finance
- Soyeon Yi, (MBA 14), South Korea's first astronaut

== See also ==
- List of United States business school rankings
- List of business schools in the United States
