= Desoer =

Desoer is a surname. Notable people with the surname include:

- Barbara J. Desoer, banker and business executive
- Charles A. Desoer (1926–2010), Belgian-American electrical engineer
