= Lesjak =

Lesjak is a surname. Notable people with the surname include:

- Catherine A. Lesjak, American business executive
- Damir Lesjak (born 1967), Croatian footballer
- Lucija Lesjak, Croatian karateka
- Urban Lesjak (born 1990), Slovenian handball player
- Zoran Lesjak (born 1988), Croatian football player
