= Terrance Odean =

American economist (born c. 1950)

Terrance Odean (born c. 1950) is the Rudd Family Foundation Professor and Chair of the Finance Group at the Haas School of Business, University of California, Berkeley. He is known for his work on behavioral finance.

After dropping out of Carleton College a half-year short of earning a creative writing degree, Odean applied to return to school at UC, Berkeley at the age of 37. Odean considered studying psychology in grad school. However, Nobel economics laureate Daniel Kahneman convinced him to pursue a Ph.D. in finance instead. He lives with his wife in Berkeley, California, and has three daughters.
