= Ann E. Harrison =

French-born American economist

- Born: France
- Education: University of Paris (DEUG); University of California, Berkeley (BA); Princeton University (PhD)
- Occupation: economist
- Known for: Bank of America Dean at the Haas School of Business

Ann E. Harrison was the 15th Dean of the Haas School of Business at the University of California, Berkeley, and the second woman to head the top-ranked business school. Dean Harrison is an economist and one of the most highly cited scholars on foreign investment and multinational firms.

== Education ==
Born in France, Harrison earned a diplôme d'études universitaires générales (DEUG) at the University of Paris. She received a bachelor of arts with majors in economics and history at UC Berkeley and a doctor of philosophy in economics from Princeton University.

== Career ==
An economist focused on international trade and global labor markets, Harrison's career extends across academic, research, and policy making positions. She is the most cited scholar globally on direct foreign investment and the second most cited scholar on multinational firms. Before becoming dean of Berkeley Haas on January 1, 2019, she was the William H. Wurster Professor of Multinational Management and of Business Economics and Public Policy at the Wharton School from 2012 to 2018. At the end of July 2024, Harrison stepped down as dean of Berkeley Haas.

From 2010 to 2011, she served as the Director of Development Policy at the World Bank, and as a professor of Agricultural and Resource Economics at UC Berkeley prior to that (2001–2011). Harrison previously held a position as associate professor of finance and economics at Columbia Business School and held visiting appointments at Harvard University's Kennedy School of Government and the University of Paris. Earlier in her career she served as Economist in the Young Professionals Program at the World Bank and as Health Economist at the Kaiser Foundation Health Plan.

== Affiliations ==
Harrison is a research associate at the National Bureau of Economic Research. She was a member of the United Nations Committee for Development Policy (CDP) from 2013 to 2018.

== Books ==
1. Fontagne, Lionel & Harrison, Ann (ed.), 2017. "The Factory-Free Economy: Outsourcing, Servitization, and the Future of Industry," OUP Catalogue, Oxford University Press, number 9780198779162.
2. Claudia Sepúlveda & Ann Harrison & Justin Yifu Lin, 2013. "Annual World Bank Conference on Development Economics—Global 2011: Development Challenges in a Postcrisis World," World Bank Publications, The World Bank, number 16184, June.
3. Harrison, Ann (ed.), 2007. "Globalization and Poverty," National Bureau of Economic Research Books, University of Chicago Press, number 9780226318004, March.
4. Ann Harrison, 2007. "Globalization and Poverty," NBER Books, National Bureau of Economic Research, Inc, number harr06-1, June.

== Publications ==
1. Harrison Ann, 2018. "International Trade or Technology? Who is Left Behind and What to do about it," Journal of Globalization and Development, De Gruyter, vol. 9(2), pages 1–15, December.
2. Leslie A. Martin & Shanthi Nataraj & Ann E. Harrison, 2017. "In with the Big, Out with the Small: Removing Small-Scale Reservations in India," American Economic Review, American Economic Association, vol. 107(2), pages 354–386, February.
3. Ann Harrison & Leslie A. Martin & Shanthi Nataraj, 2017. "Green Industrial Policy in Emerging Markets," Annual Review of Economics, Annual Reviews, vol. 9(1), pages 253–274, October.
4. Harrison, Ann, 2015. "Trade and Poverty: When the Third World Fell Behind. By Jeffrey G. Williamson. Cambridge: The MIT Press, 2011. Pp. 320. $37.00, hardcover; $24.00, paper; 17.00, ebook," The Journal of Economic History, Cambridge University Press, vol. 75(2), pages 617–619, June.
5. Philippe Aghion & Jing Cai & Mathias Dewatripont & Luosha Du & Ann Harrison & Patrick Legros, 2015. "Industrial Policy and Competition," American Economic Journal: Macroeconomics, American Economic Association, vol. 7(4), pages 1–32, October.
6. Du, Luosha & Harrison, Ann & Jefferson, Gary, 2014. "FDI Spillovers and Industrial Policy: The Role of Tariffs and Tax Holidays," World Development, Elsevier, vol. 64(C), pages 366–383.
7. Harrison, Ann E. & Lin, Justin Yifu & Xu, Lixin Colin, 2014. "Explaining Africa’s (Dis)advantage," World Development, Elsevier, vol. 63(C), pages 59–77.
8. Avraham Ebenstein & Ann Harrison & Margaret McMillan & Shannon Phillips, 2014. "Estimating the Impact of Trade and Offshoring on American Workers using the Current Population Surveys," The Review of Economics and Statistics, MIT Press, vol. 96(4), pages 581–595, October.
9. Ann E. Harrison & Leslie A. Martin & Shanthi Nataraj, 2013. "Learning versus Stealing: How Important Are Market-Share Reallocations to India's Productivity Growth?," World Bank Economic Review, World Bank Group, vol. 27(2), pages 202–228.
10. Du, Luosha & Harrison, Ann & Jefferson, Gary H., 2012. "Testing for horizontal and vertical foreign investment spillovers in China, 1998–2007," Journal of Asian Economics, Elsevier, vol. 23(3), pages 234–243.
11. Ann Harrison & Claudia Sepúlveda, 2011. "Learning from Developing Country Experience: Growth and Economic Thought before and after the 2008–2009 Crisis," Comparative Economic Studies, Palgrave Macmillan;Association for Comparative Economic Studies, vol. 53(3), pages 431–453, September.
12. Ann Harrison & Margaret McMillan, 2011. "Offshoring Jobs? Multinationals and U.S. Manufacturing Employment," The Review of Economics and Statistics, MIT Press, vol. 93(3), pages 857–875, August.
13. Ann Harrison & John McLaren & Margaret McMillan, 2011. "Recent Perspectives on Trade and Inequality," Annual Review of Economics, Annual Reviews, vol. 3(1), pages 261–289, September.
14. Ann Harrison & Jason Scorse, 2010. "Multinationals and Anti-sweatshop Activism," American Economic Review, American Economic Association, vol. 100(1), pages 247–273, March.
15. Ann Harrison & Margaret McMillan, 2007. "On the links between globalization and poverty," The Journal of Economic Inequality, Springer;Society for the Study of Economic Inequality, vol. 5(1), pages 123–134, April.
16. Ann P. Bartel & Ann E. Harrison, 2005. "Ownership Versus Environment: Disentangling the Sources of Public-Sector Inefficiency," The Review of Economics and Statistics, MIT Press, vol. 87(1), pages 135–147, February.
17. Harrison, Ann E. & Love, Inessa & McMillan, Margaret S., 2004. "Global capital flows and financing constraints,"Journal of Development Economics, Elsevier, vol. 75(1), pages 269-301, October.
18. Eskeland, Gunnar S. & Harrison, Ann E., 2003. "Moving to greener pastures? Multinationals and the pollution haven hypothesis," Journal of Development Economics, Elsevier, vol. 70(1), pages 1–23, February.
19. Harrison, Ann E. & McMillan, Margaret S., 2003. "Does direct foreign investment affect domestic credit constraints?," Journal of International Economics, Elsevier, vol. 61(1), pages 73–100, October.
20. Harrison, Ann, 2002. "The World Bank: Structure and Policies: Christopher L. Gilbert and David Vines (Eds.), Cambridge University Press," Journal of International Economics, Elsevier, vol. 57(1), pages 253–256, June.
21. Harrison, Ann & Hanson, Gordon, 1999. "Who gains from trade reform? Some remaining puzzles," Journal of Development Economics, Elsevier, vol. 59(1), pages 125–154, June.
22. Gordon H. Hanson & Ann Harrison, 1999. "Trade Liberalization and Wage Inequality in Mexico," ILR Review, Cornell University, ILR School, vol. 52(2), pages 271–288, January.
23. Ann E. Harrison & Brian J. Aitken, 1999. "Do Domestic Firms Benefit from Direct Foreign Investment? Evidence from Venezuela," American Economic Review, American Economic Association, vol. 89(3), pages 605–618, June.
24. Aitken, Brian & Hanson, Gordon H. & Harrison, Ann E., 1997. "Spillovers, foreign investment, and export behavior,"Journal of International Economics, Elsevier, vol. 43(1-2), pages 103-132, August.
25. Currie, Janet & Harrison, Ann E, 1997. "Sharing the Costs: The Impact of Trade Reform on Capital and Labor in Morocco," Journal of Labor Economics, University of Chicago Press, vol. 15(3), pages 44–71, July.
26. Harrison, Ann E & Leamer, Edward, 1997. "Labor Markets in Developing Countries: An Agenda for Research,"Journal of Labor Economics, University of Chicago Press, vol. 15(3), pages 1-19, July.
27. Harrison, Ann, 1996. "Openness and growth: A time-series, cross-country analysis for developing countries,"Journal of Development Economics, Elsevier, vol. 48(2), pages 419-447, March.
28. Aitken, Brian & Harrison, Ann & Lipsey, Robert E., 1996. "Wages and foreign ownership A comparative study of Mexico, Venezuela, and the United States," Journal of International Economics, Elsevier, vol. 40(3–4), pages 345–371, May.
29. Harrison, Ann E, 1994. "An Empirical Test of the Infant Industry Argument: Comment," American Economic Review, American Economic Association, vol. 84(4), pages 1090–1095, September.
30. Harrison, Ann E., 1994. "Productivity, imperfect competition and trade reform: Theory and evidence," Journal of International Economics, Elsevier, vol. 36(1–2), pages 53–73, February.
31. Haddad, Mona & Harrison, Ann, 1993. "Are there positive spillovers from direct foreign investment?: Evidence from panel data for Morocco," Journal of Development Economics, Elsevier, vol. 42(1), pages 51–74, October.
