= Michelle Maykin =

American activist (1982–2009)

- มิเชล เมฆินทร์
- Born: January 20, 1982; Dallas, Texas, U.S.
- Died: July 25, 2009 (aged 27); Dallas, Texas, U.S.
- Cause of death: Complications from acute myeloid leukemia
- Resting place: Montara Beach, California
- Education: College Park High School; University of California, Berkeley (B.S.)
- Occupations: Health advocate, internal auditor
- Organization: Project Michelle
- Parent(s): Petuck Maykin; Megan “Thu” Williams
- Website: projectmichelle.com

Michelle Kim Maykin (Thai: มิเชล เมฆินทร์, January 20, 1982 – July 25, 2009) was a well-known figure in the Asian American community who promoted ethnic participation in the national marrow registry, the National Marrow Donor Program. Suffering from acute myeloid leukemia herself, she began a personal search for a bone marrow donor and began the internationally noted campaign, Project Michelle, which registered more than 18,000 people and led to bone marrow matches and donations for 62 different patients. Unable to find a match herself, she died on July 25, 2009.

== Early life and education ==
Born on January 20, 1982, Michelle Kim Maykin was of Vietnamese, Chinese, and Thai descent. She was born in Dallas, Texas, but raised in the San Francisco Bay Area and was the daughter of Petuck Maykin and Megan “Thu” Williams.

After graduating from College Park High School, Pleasant Hill, CA, Maykin attended the University of California, Berkeley’s Haas School of Business and received her B.S. in Business Administration. During this time, she was heavily active in the community, involved in such activities like the International Business Fraternity of Delta Sigma Pi, where she acted as Chancellor, Interchapter Liaison, as well as Vice President of Pledge Class Operations; as an assistant dance instructor to Wat Buddhanusorn Thai Temple; as well as Volunteer Activity Coordinator to the Santa Clara Juvenile Hall.

== Project Michelle ==
Diagnosed with acute myeloid leukemia on February 27, 2007, Maykin underwent numerous rounds of chemotherapy and reached a state of remission. After months of searching, she received a cord blood transplant in November 2008 which seemingly allowed her to regain control of certain aspects of her life. Due to her experiences with AML, seeking to help others affected by blood cancer, and seeing the disparities located within the racial make-up of potential donors, she began dedicating herself to helping others by creating Project Michelle, a grassroots campaign which focused on recruiting people to become potential bone marrow donors—specifically in Asian American communities.

Originally started by Maykin, her family, and close friends, the project itself was an effort to find a bone marrow match for Maykin as well as for others who needed bone marrow transplants. Gaining nationwide attention, the project grew into a volunteer effort that has sustained itself through much community support. The campaign launched teams in over ten cities that organized ~350 registration drives in participating schools, community centers, religious centers, and small and large companies. Maykin's efforts received support from many celebrities in the Asian American community, such as American television personality Yul Kwon, who helped raise awareness for Project Michelle and the need for more bone marrow donors in the Asian American and other ethnic communities.

The organization has since registered over 18,000 new donors, found four matches for blood cancer patients, as well as launched numerous campaigns which grew out of Maykin's initial efforts, such as the highly publicized Helping Janet.

As of June 2023, Project Michelle donor registrations have led to 62 bone marrow donations.

== Death and legacy ==
In April 2008, two months after returning to work, Maykin began feeling symptoms comparable to those she felt in her original diagnosis. On May 7, 2008, her oncologist confirmed that she had indeed relapsed. In addition to this, a magnetic resonance imaging scan (MRI) revealed a mass on her brain.

Maykin died at her mother's home in Contra Costa County on July 25, 2009, at the age of 27. Her ashes were scattered in the Pacific Ocean near Montara Beach in northern California.

Maykin's crusade to increase awareness of leukemia and lymphoma within communities of color inspired other individuals, such as Janet Liang, to press forward with their searches for donors.

California state senator Mark DeSaulnier of Concord introduced Senate Bill 1304, the Michelle Maykin Memorial Donation Protection Act; promoted by Maykins' mother, the bill passed the legislature and was signed into law by governor Arnold Schwarzenegger in 2010. The act states that all employees in the state of California who work for an employer with 15 or more employees will be protected and have legal rights if they are called upon to donate stem cells or an organ. Moreover, any period of time taken from work to donate marrow will not be considered as a break in continuous service; and the employer shall maintain and pay for coverage under a group health plan for the full duration of leave.
