= Rob Chandra =

American venture capitalist (c. 1965 – 2019)

Rob Chandra (1965 or 1966 – October 19 or 20, 2019) was an Indian-American venture capitalist.

== Early life and education ==
After graduating in 1988 from UC Berkeley with a B.A. in economics and receiving his MBA from Harvard School of Business, he oversaw Bessemer Venture Partners's investments in India. He then left that position and in 2012, started Avid Park, a hedge fund focused on the technology sector. His accomplishments as a venture capitalist landed him on the Forbes Midas List. Chandra eventually returned to his alma mater to teach entrepreneurship at its Haas School of Business. The school awarded him the Earl F. Cheit Outstanding Teaching Award twice and named him a Distinguished Teaching Fellow.

== Death ==
Chandra died over the weekend of October 19, 2019. The Haas School of Business established the Rob Chandra Memorial Fund for Teaching Excellence in his memory.
