= Paul Tiffany =

Paul Tiffany is a senior lecturer (Emeritus) at the Haas School of Business at the University of California, Berkeley. He is the author of The Decline of American Steel, How Management, Labor and Government Went Wrong (New York: Oxford University Press, 1988), Business Plans for Dummies (3rd Ed. 2022), and Starting a Business for Dummies (4th Ed. 2026).

Tiffany holds a BA from Loyola University of Los Angeles, an MBA from Harvard Business School and a PhD from the Haas School of Business at the University of California, Berkeley. He was previously a member of the faculty of Stanford University, University of Pennsylvania, Georgetown University, CEIBS (China), AVT (Denmark), IOMBA (University of Geneva), and Sasin (Chulalongkorn University, Thailand).
