= Michael R. Gallagher =

American businessman

Michael R. Gallagher was the CEO and director of Playtex Products, Inc., from July 1995 until his retirement in December 2004.

Prior to that, Gallagher was CEO of North America for Reckitt & Colman PLC, a consumer products company based in London. He was also the president and CEO of Eastman Kodak's subsidiary L&F Products, a cleaning products company, from 1988 to 1994.

Michael serves as the chair of the board of advisors of the Haas School of Business, University of California, Berkeley and the board of trustees of St. Luke's School. He holds an MBA from the Haas School of Business at the University of California, Berkeley.
