= Richard H. Holton =

American economist (1926–2005)

- Born: 1926
- Died: 2005 (aged 78–79)
- Education: Harvard University (PhD), Ohio State University (MA)
- Spouse: Constance Holton
- Scientific career
- Institutions: University of California, Berkeley, Harvard University (1953-1957)

Richard Henry Holton (1926-2005) was an American economist and the E. T. Grether Professor of Marketing, Emeritus at the University of California, Berkeley. He was the eighth dean of Haas School of Business.

== Books ==
- The Canadian Economy: Prospect and Retrospect" (1959)
- Marketing Efficiency in Puerto Rico, John Kenneth Galbraith, Richard Henry Holton, Robert E. Branson, Jean Ruth Robinson, Carolyn Shaw Bell, Harvard University Press
- United States-China Relations, University of California Press, 1989
