= Andrew Rudd =

American businessman (1950–2024)

Andrew T. Rudd
- Born: February 23, 1950
- Died: April 2, 2024 (aged 74)
- Education: University of California, Berkeley
- Occupations: Investor, venture capitalist, author

Andrew Rudd was an American investor, financial academic, author and venture capitalist that co-founded and was former chairman and CEO of Barra, Inc. and founder and former CEO of Advisor Software.

His areas of academic interest were asset allocation, modern portfolio theory, risk management, and performance measurement. He was the co-author of two investment related books: Modern Portfolio Theory: The Principles of Investment Management and Option Pricing.

== Early life and education ==
He studied at the University of California, Berkeley, where he earned an MS in Operations Research, an MBA and PhD in Operations research and Finance. From 1977 to 1982, he was a Professor of Finance and Operations Research at the Johnson School at Cornell University in Ithaca, New York.

== Career ==
He served as the CEO of Barra from 1984 to 1999. In 2004, Barra was acquired by Morgan Stanley Capital International and renamed MSCI Barra. Rudd was the founder and former CEO of Advisor Software. Advisor Software was acquired by Refinitiv in 2020.

== Endowments ==
Rudd chaired the Rudd Family Foundation, which supports educational and youth activities. The foundation has endowed faculty chairs at the Haas School of Business, University of Massachusetts, The Johnson School at Cornell University, and the Blum Centre for Developing Economies at the University of California, Berkeley. He was also a trustee of The Blum Center, a member of The Johnson School Advisory Council. He has written several journal articles and co-authored two books on investment management.

== Selected published works ==
- Barr Rosenberg and Andrew Rudd, "Factor-Related and specific returns of common stocks: Serial correlation and market inefficiency", Journal of Finance, Volume 37, Issue 2, May 1982, Pages 543–554.
- Robert Jarrow and Andrew Rudd, "Approximate option valuation for arbitrary stochastic processes", Journal of Financial Economics, Volume 10, Issue 3, November 1982, Pages 347–369.
- Robert Jarrow and Andrew Rudd, Option Pricing, 1983, Irwin Professional Publishing.
- Jeremy Evnine and Andrew Rudd, "Index options: The early evidence", Journal of Finance, Volume 40, Issue 3, July 1985, Pages 743-756.
- Richard Grinold, Andrew Rudd, and Dan Stefek, "Global factors: Fact or fiction", Journal of Portfolio Management, Volume 16, Issue 1, Fall 1989.
