= Janet Bercovitz =

American business academic

Janet Bercovitz is an American entrepreneurship scholar and the Deming Professor of Entrepreneurship at the Leeds School of Business at the University of Colorado, Boulder in strategy, entrepreneurship, and operations.

== Early career ==
Bercovitz graduated with BS degree in chemistry, an MBA, and a PhD in Business and Public Policy with a concentration in strategy from the Haas School of Business at the University of California, Berkeley. Her PhD advisor was Oliver Williamson.

Bercovitz was a faculty member at the Fuqua School of Business at Duke University. From 2005 to 2017 she served as an assistant professor and tenured associate professor in the Strategy and Entrepreneurship faculty group at the College of Business at the University of Illinois at Urbana-Champaign. In addition, she held a courtesy appointment in the Institute of Genomic Biology and has been a Miller Faculty Fellow at the Academy of Entrepreneurial Leadership at the University of Illinois. In 2017, she joined the University of Colorado as a professor of Strategy and Entrepreneurship.

== Research ==
Bercovitz's research studies inter-firm alliance structures, contractual and relational foundations of alliance governance, and the behavioral dynamics that shape contracts between organizations.

Bercovitz is an authority on academic entrepreneurship and technology transfer coming out of university research. Bercovitz asks the basic question of why some academic units and individual professors are actively engaged in technology transfer, while others are much less engaged. Her work with longtime co-author Maryann Feldman points to organizational structures and individual characteristics. Prior research had suggested that such certain universities are more prolific in technology transfer simply due to their greater scientific resources. Bercovitz and Feldman identified the role of social forces within an academic unit on the likelihood of becoming an academic entrepreneur. For example, at a local level, individual researchers' decisions to disclose inventions might be shaped by the norms of their own doctoral training, the behavior of their peer group in the university, and disclosure activities by a department chair. These influences go beyond selection effects from hiring researchers with a greater, or lesser, proclivity to disclose. Bercovitz has also studied the structure of contracting relationships in university technology transfer, and information technology service contracts.

Bercovicz has also studied business franchisor-franchisee agreements.
