= Ralph Bahna =

American business executive (1942–2014)

- Born: August 23, 1942; Grand Rapids, Michigan
- Died: February 24, 2014 (aged 71); Manhattan
- Education: University of Michigan, University of California, Berkeley
- Occupations: CEO, Cunard Line1980-1989
- Spouse: Dorothy Ballard
- Children: 3

Ralph M. Bahna (August 23, 1942 – February 24, 2014) was an American business executive. Bahna served as the CEO of Cunard Line from 1980 until 1989 and Chairman of Priceline.com from 2004 to 2013. He also founded Club Quarters, a membership-based chain of hotels aimed at business travelers.

== Early life ==
Bahna was born in Grand Rapids, Michigan, on August 23, 1942. He was the youngest of two children of Ralph and Frieda (née Mushro) Bahna. His father was a lawyer. Bahna did not have a middle name, so he later added the initial "M" to his name. He enrolled at the University of Michigan in Ann Arbor, where he competed as a Big Ten Conference wrestler (He won the 123-pound title as a college senior). Bahna obtained a bachelor's degree from the University of Michigan in 1964. In 1965, he received a Master of Business Administration from the Haas School of Business at the University of California, Berkeley.

== TWA ==
Bahna was hired for the commercial sales department of Trans World Airlines (TWA). He became especially interested in business class, an airline travel class which was developing within the aviation industry during the 1960s and 1970s. He created a new plan for a potential TWA business class, with specific onboard amenities and seating areas. Once Bahna created his plan, he spent two years persuading TWA's executives to implement his idea, which became known as TWA’s Ambassador Class. The program was priced less than first class, but offered many of the amenities to business travelers. Ambassador Class revived TWA's profits and sparked similar business class programs throughout the airline industry.

== Cunard ==
In 1973, Bahna became the head of Cunard Line's North American division at the age of 30, having been promoted from his previous position of Vice President of marketing and sales. He was further promoted to Cunard's President and COO of worldwide operations in 1977, when he was just 34 years old.

In 1981, Bahna became the CEO of Cunard, becoming the first American to head Cunard's global operations. Cunard had suffered financial losses in 1979, so Bahna implemented as series of austerity measures aimed at cutting costs. For example, he negotiated a series of concessions, including cuts in pay increases, from British labor unions.

Bahna moved planned renovations on the Queen Elizabeth 2 (QE2) from the United Kingdom to the Bethlehem Steel ship yard in Bayonne, New Jersey, where work would be cheaper. The move allowed the QE2 to sail directly to the Caribbean during the peak winter season once renovations were complete. During the mid-1980s, Bahna also oversaw the QE2's transformation from steam power to diesel power, which added an estimated 20 years to the lifespan of the ship.

Bahna is credited not only with saving the QE2, but also with shaping the modern cruise industry itself. Bahna oversaw Cunard's acquisition of Norwegian America Line in 1983. In 1986, Bahna spearheaded Cunard's purchase of two cruise ships, the Sea Goddess I and Sea Goddess I, from Norske Cruise. Bahna also pioneered cruises to Alaska, which departed and disembarked at different ports of call. Trips to Alaska (along with separate departure and ending ports) are now a very common practice with the cruise industry.

Ralph Bahna struck a deal with British Airways. The partnership allowed Cunard passengers to sail across the Atlantic Ocean on board a Cunard ship. The passengers could then return to the United Kingdom by flying on British Airways' Concorde. Cunard was soon the single largest purchaser of Concorde seats.

One of the key aspects of his management style was the extraordinary manner he treated employees. During his tenure at Cunard, every employee was accorded the opportunity to try every product in the best available class of service at the time of booking. In this way every person in the company had first-hand knowledge of the quality of the product as a customer—from first class transatlantic crossings, to the Concorde, to staying at the Ritz in London.

Bahna stepped down as Cunard's CEO in 1989.

== Club Quarters ==
In 1994, Bahna founded Club Quarters, a membership-based hotel chain aimed at business travelers. Bahna opened the first Club Quarters hotel on West 45th Street in Midtown Manhattan. In a 2012 interview, Bahna outlined his original goal for Club Quarters, saying he wanted "to have the best locations, be full service, charge less, and still make a big profit." Under Bahna, the chain expanded to new locations near major corporate and financial centers. There are now Club Quarters branches located in major cities throughout the United States, as well as London.

== Priceline.com ==
Ralph Bahna joined the board of directors of Priceline.com in 1998 when the website was established. Founded by Jay S. Walker, Priceline.com became a public company in 1998. Bahna became the chairman of Priceline.com in 2004, a position he held until his retirement on January 1, 2013.

== Later life ==
In 2009, he and his wife, Dorothy, donated much of the funding needed to construct the Bahna Wrestling Center at his alma mater, the University of Michigan.

Bahna died from cardiac failure at New York-Presbyterian Hospital in Manhattan, New York City, on February 24, 2014, at the age of 71. He was survived by his wife, Dorothy Ballard; three children: Laura Lovejoy, Deborah Chrabolowski, and Adam; and eight grandchildren. Bahna had been a resident of Stamford, Connecticut.
