= Jennifer Chatman =

American academic

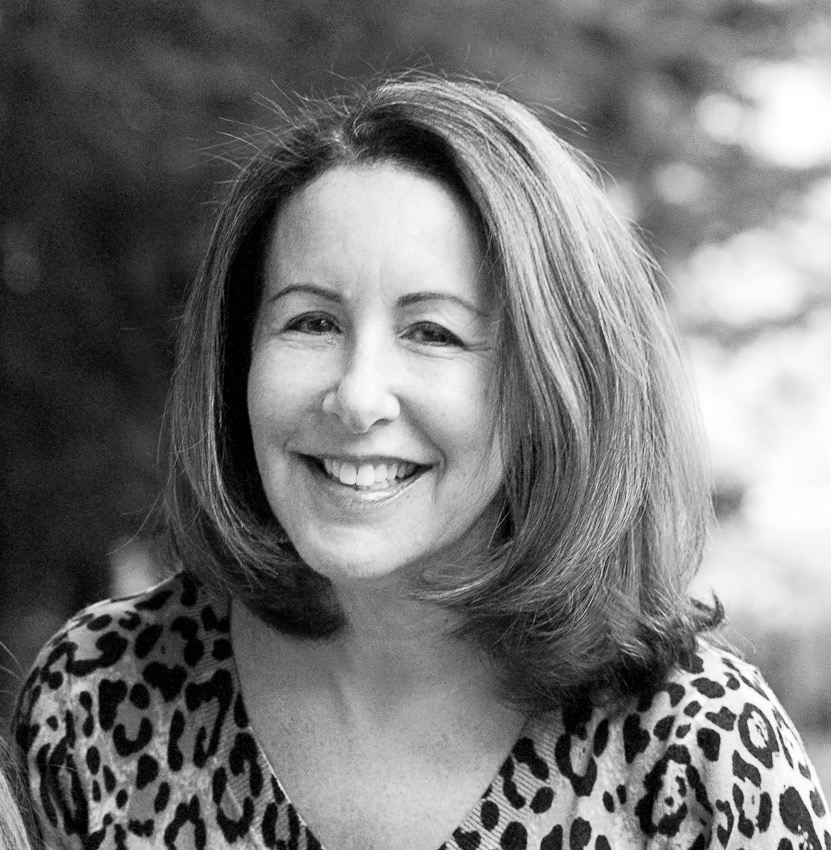
- Title: Distinguished Professor of Management

Academic background
- Education: University of California, Berkeley (BA, PhD)

Academic work
- Discipline: Management
- Institutions: Haas School of Business; Kellogg School of Management
- Main interests: Organizational culture

Jennifer A. Chatman is an American academic who is the 16th dean of the Haas School of Business at the University of California, Berkeley and the Paul J. Cortese Distinguished Professor of Management. Chatman is also the co-director of the Berkeley Center for Workplace Culture and Innovation. She previously served as interim dean, acting dean, associate dean for academic affairs, and associate dean for learning strategies at the Haas School of Business, and editor for the journal Research in Organizational Behavior.

== Education ==
Chatman received her BA and PhD from UC Berkeley and began her career at the Kellogg School of Management at Northwestern University in Chicago, Illinois, before returning to UC Berkeley's Haas School of Business. She served as the Marvin Bower Fellow at the Harvard Business School.

== Research ==
Chatman's research explores how organizational culture relates to organizational performance and also focuses on providing a conceptually rigorous and valid approach to assessing culture.

Classic research in psychology, dating back to Sherif's pioneering work on the so-called "Robber's Cave" experiments showed that social norms, particularly those that orient group members toward group goals, are remarkably strong predictors of behavior. Chatman's work has been part of a more recent effort to link norms to processes and outcomes among diverse work groups.

Chatman's research on leadership focuses on reconceptualizing traditional theories of leadership which have, by many accounts, reached a point of stagnation. By stripping down the psychological basis of leadership in influence she is able to make more progress in understanding how leaders affect followers in organizations.

On August 1, 2024, following the retirement of Ann E. Harrison, Chatman became the interim dean of the Haas School of Business at the University of California, Berkeley.

== Other activities ==
Chatman is a member of the Board of Directors of Simpson Manufacturing (NYSE: SSD) and a Trustee of Prospect Sierra School. She runs the Leading Strategy Execution Through Culture executive education program at Haas.

== Selected publications ==
- Chatman, J., Bell, N., & Staw, B. (1986). The managed thought: The role of self-justification and impression management in organizational settings. In Gioia, D., & Sims, H. (Eds.), The Thinking Organization: Dynamics of Social Cognition. S.F., CA: Jossey-Bass. p. 191-214.
- Chatman, J. (1989). Improving interactional organizational behavior: A model of person-organization fit. Academy of Management Review, 14: 333–349.
- Chatman, J. (1991). Matching people and organizations: Selection and socialization in public accounting firms. Administrative Science Quarterly, 36: 459–484.
- Chatman, J. & Jehn, K. (1994). Assessing the relationship between industry characteristics and organizational culture: How different can you be? Academy of Management Journal, 37: 522–553.
- Chatman, J., Caldwell, D., & O'Reilly, C. (1999). Managerial personality and early career success: A semi-idiographic approach. Journal of Research in Personality. 33: 514–545.
- Flynn, F. & Chatman, J. (2001). Strong cultures and innovation: Oxymoron or opportunity? In S. Cartwright et al., (Eds.), International Handbook of Organizational Culture and Climate, Sussex: John Wiley & Sons, pp. 263–287.
- Malka, A. & Chatman, J. (2003). Intrinsic and extrinsic work orientations as moderators of the effect of annual income on subjective well-being. Personality and Social Psychology Bulletin, 29 (6): 737-746.
- Flynn, F. & Chatman, J. (2003). “What’s the norm here?” Social categorization as a basis for group norm development. In Polzer, J., Mannix, E., and Neale, M. (eds.) Research in Managing Groups and Teams (pp: 135–160). JAI Press, Elsevier Science: London.
- Chatman, J., & Spataro, S. (2005). Using self-categorization theory to understand relational demography-based variations in people's responsiveness to organizational culture. Academy of Management Journal. 48 (2): 321–331.
- Caldwell, D., Chatman, J., & O’Reilly, C. (2008). Profile comparison methods for assessing person-situation fit. In C. Ostroff and T. Judge (Eds.), Perspectives On Organizational Fit. Lawrence Erlbaum Associates, Mahwah, New Jersey.
- Chatman, J. (2010). Norms in mixed race and mixed sex work groups. In James P. Walsh and Arthur P. Brief (Eds.) Academy of Management Annals, Vol. 4 (1), 447–484.
- Chatman, J. A. (2010). Overcoming Prejudice in the Workplace. In J. Marsh, R. Mendoza-Denton & J. Smith (Eds.), Are We Born Racist?: New Insights from Neuroscience and Positive Psychology (pp. 75). Boston: Beacon.
- Chatman, J., & Kennedy, J. (2010). Psychological perspectives on leadership. In N. Norhia and R. Kurana (Eds.) Leadership: Advancing the Discipline. PP 159–182. Harvard Business Press, Boston.
- Chatman, J., Goncalo, J., Kennedy, J., & Duguid, M. (2011). Political correctness at work. In E. Mannix & M. Neale, Research on Managing Groups and Teams. Vol. 15, JAI Press, Elsevier Science: London.
- Sherman E. & Chatman J. (2011). Socialization. In The Encyclopedia of Management. E. H. Kessler (Ed.), Sage.
- Chatman, J., Caldwell, D., O’Reilly, C., & Doerr, B. (2014). Parsing organizational culture: The joint influence of culture content and strength on performance in high-technology firms, Journal of Organizational Behavior, 35 (6): 785–808.
- Chatman, J. (2014). Culture change at Genentech. California Management Review. 56 (2): 113–129.
- O’Reilly, C., Doerr, B., Caldwell, D., & Chatman, J. (2014). Narcissistic CEOs and executive compensation. The Leadership Quarterly. 25 (2): 218–231.
- Chatman, J. & Caldwell, D. (2015). Leading organizations: The challenge of developing a strategically effective organizational culture without succumbing to the negative effects of power. M. Augier & D. Teece (Eds). Leadership. The Palgrave Encyclopedia of Strategic Management. Palgrave Macmillan.
- Chatman J.A. & O’Reilly C.A. (2016). Paradigm lost: Reinvigorating the study of organizational culture. In B. Staw & A. Brief (Eds.), Research in Organizational Behavior, Vol. 38, JAI Press: 199–224.
- O’Reilly, C., Chatman, J., & Doerr, B. (2018). See you in court: How CEO narcissism increases firms’ vulnerability to lawsuits. The Leadership Quarterly, 29 (3): 365–442.
- Chatman, J., Greer, L., Sherman, E., & Doerr, B. (2019). Blurred lines: How collectivism mutes the disruptive and elaborating effects of demographic heterogeneity in Himalayan expeditions. Organization Science, 30 (2): 235–259.
- Canning, E., Murphy, M., Emerson, K., Chatman, J., Dweck, C., & Kray, L. (2020). Cultures of genius at work: Organizational mindsets predict cultural norms, trust, and commitment. Personality and Social Psychology Bulletin, 46(4), 626–642.
