= Seymour Chatman =

American film and literary critic

Seymour Chatman (August 30, 1928 – November 4, 2015) was an American film and literary critic and professor emeritus of rhetoric at the University of California, Berkeley.

He is one of the most significant figures of American narratology (theory of narrative), regarded as a prominent representative of its structuralist branch.

== Personal life ==
Seymour Chatman was married three times, to Evelyn (divorced in 1964), Sidsel (divorced circa 1970), and Barbara. He has three children, Emily Chatman Duffy, an artist, Jennifer Chatman, a professor and dean of the Haas School of Business at UC Berkeley, and Mariel Chatman Lassalle, a lawyer and diplomat working for the US Department of State. He has four granddaughters, Ava, Sonya, Noemie, and Anais.

== Published works ==
Chatman's work includes:

- The Later Style of Henry James (1972)
- Story and Discourse: Narrative Structure in Fiction and Film (1978)
- Michelangelo Antonioni, or, the Surface of the World (1985)
- Coming to Terms. The Rhetoric of Narrative in Fiction and Film (1990)
- Reading Narrative Fiction (1993)
- Michelangelo Antonioni: The Complete Films (2004) with Paul Duncan
