= Laura E. Flores =

Panamanian Ambassador

Laura Elena Flores Herrera (born 1968) is a Panamanian citizen who served as her country's Permanent Representative to the United Nations from September 2014 to November 2017. Flores is currently Director for the Americas Division in the Departments of Political and Peacebuilding Affairs & Peace Operations at the UN New York Headquarters.

== Early life and education ==
Flores was born in 1968 and raised in Panama. Her grandfather was a member of Panama's first delegation to the UN in 1946. She has a Bachelor of Arts in Economics and International Relations from Brown University and an MBA from Berkeley's Haas School of Business.

== Career ==
Flores’ professional career in human development spans over 25 years experience in public administration, communications and project management in areas ranging from education to sustainability to public health. Flores worked in Washington, D.C. at the Academy for Educational Development from 1995 until 1997. She returned to Panama, working at the Interoceanic Region Authority from 1995 until 1997 and as Vice Minister for Foreign Trade in the Ministry of Trade and Industry in 1998 and 1999.

Flores was executive director of the Business Initiatives Office of the Smithsonian Tropical Research Institute from 1999 until 2002, and then worked for the World Wildlife Fund from 2002 until 2006.

Flores was Assistant Representative to the United Nations Population Fund in Panama from 2006 until 2014. She was appointed as Panama's Permanent Representative to the UN by President Juan Carlos Varela on September 4, 2014. She co-founded the Ambassadors Kids Club, a network that brings UN Ambassadors together around play dates for their children. She is an advocate for gender equality and a Gender Champion.

== Personal life ==
Flores is divorced and has a son.
