= Robert B. Ford =

American businessman

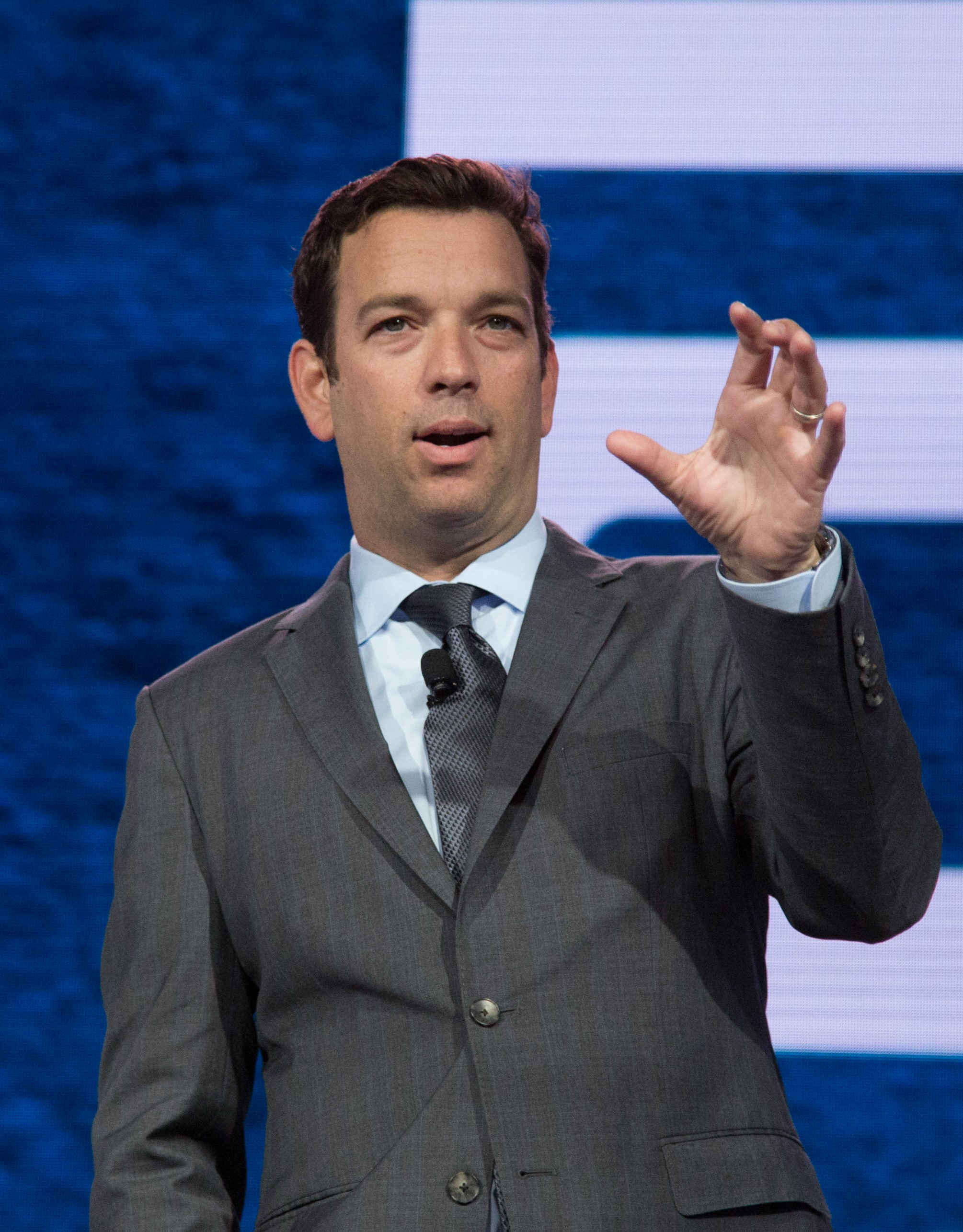
- Robert Ford in 2018
- Education: Boston College; Berkeley Haas (MBA)
- Years active: 1996–present
- Employer: Abbott Laboratories
- Title: Chairman, chief executive officer
- Term: March 31, 2020 – present

Robert B. Ford is an American businessman, and the chief executive officer and chairman of Abbott Laboratories, a publicly traded medical devices and health care company based in Abbott Park, Illinois. He received a bachelor's degree from Boston College and an MBA from Haas School of Business.

== Career ==
Ford joined Abbott in 1996 within its diabetes care business, later heading the company's medical device businesses, and Abbott's integration of St. Jude Medical in 2017, its largest acquisition at the time. He was named president and COO in October 2018.

In March 2020, Ford became the chief executive officer of Abbott. He stated that the sale of medical devices such as FreeStyle Libre and diagnostics would be prioritized as well as developing technology to monitor consumer health through smartphones and other connected devices.

At the beginning of the COVID-19 pandemic, Ford led the company's COVID-19 testing development and distribution. He pulled Abbott's scientists and manufacturing teams off their projects to work on four teams, each focused on specific tests. The company introduced its first two tests in March 2020 and delivered more than 400 million in 2020. Ford said he considers Abbott's BinaxNOW test to be a model, setting a trend for rapid point-of-care testing after the coronavirus pandemic for ailments such as influenza, sexually transmitted diseases, and hepatitis. In April 2020, Chief Executive recognized Ford for Abbott's response to accessibility for testing.

In December 2021, Ford became Abbott's chairman as well as CEO.
