= Barbara J. Desoer =

CitiGroup

Barbara J. Desoer was CEO for Citibank, N.A. beginning April 1, 2014 and finished as CEO on May 10, 2019, and was the COO for Citibank, N.A. from October 2013 to April 1, 2014. She was president of Bank of America Home Loans, a leading U.S. mortgage originator and servicer. She was a member of the senior management team of Bank of America Corporation, having previously reporting to CEO Brian Moynihan. Desoer led a business accounting for about 20 percent of the U.S. mortgage origination market, with a $2 trillion servicing portfolio serving nearly 14 million customers—nearly one in five mortgages in the U.S. She also managed Bank of America's home equity business and oversaw a leading insurance service organization.

Desoer assumed her role in mid-2008 when she was asked to lead the integration of Countrywide Financial Corporation, which Bank of America acquired July 1, 2008. She led the April 2009 launch of the Bank of America Home Loans brand.

Prior to her mortgage role, Desoer served as chief technology and operations officer, managing the bank's global technology platforms and operations capabilities. She joined Bank of America in 1977 and has held leadership roles in commercial lending, consumer products, retail banking and marketing.

In 2008, Desoer was recognized by US Banker, ranking second in their annual ranking of "25 Most Powerful Women in Banking." She was also recognized by Fortune magazine as one of the "50 Most Powerful Women in Business" and ranked third on The Wall Street Journal's "50 women to watch" list. In 2007, she was named "Business Leader of the Year" by the Haas School of Business at the University of California at Berkeley. In 2009, Forbes named her one of the 100 most powerful women in the world.

She received her B.A. in mathematics from Mount Holyoke College in 1974 and her MBA from the University of California, Berkeley.

A New York Times article reported that Desoer announced her retirement in February 2012. Bank of America stated that due to restructuring her position would not be filled and her unit would report to David Darnell who oversees the consumer banking branch of the company.
