= Will Mitchell =

Canadian and American scholar of business (1953–2021)

- Born: William Gordon Mitchell; 13 April 1953; Trail, British Columbia
- Died: 6 December 2021 (aged 68); Toronto
- Years active: 1988–2021
- Spouse: Dilys Bowman
- Children: 3

Academic background
- Education: Simon Fraser University (BBA (hons.)); University of California, Berkeley (PhD)
- Thesis: Dynamic commercialization: An organizational economic analysis of innovation in the medical diagnostic imaging industry (1988)

Academic work
- Institutions: University of Michigan (1988–2001); Duke University (2001–2021); University of Toronto (2011–2021)
- Website: Personal; Rotman; Duke

William Gordon Mitchell (13 April 1953 – 6 December 2021) was a Canadian–American scholar of business. He received his BBA from Simon Fraser University and his PhD from the University of California, Berkeley. At various points he held the Jack D. Sparks–Whirlpool Corporation Research Professorship of Business Administration at the University of Michigan; the J. Rex Fuqua Professorship of International Management at Duke University; and the Anthony S. Fell Chair in New Technologies and Commercialization at the University of Toronto. In a 2012 profile, Simon Fraser called him "not only one of the great business minds to graduate from the university, but indeed one of the world's foremost business scholars".

== Early life and education ==
Will Mitchell was born on 13 April 1953 in Trail, British Columbia. He was the eldest of six children born to Dorothy May (née Harris) of Penticton, and Kenneth William Mitchell of Victoria; Trish, Candy, Don, Eli (formerly Beth), and Heather would follow. Both parents were teachers, and had met in Oliver. They become engaged in March 1952, and married in Penticton on 10 April of that year. They moved to Trail shortly thereafter in order for Ken Mitchell to set up the auto mechanics shop program at J. Lloyd Crowe Secondary School.

In 1962, when Mitchell was eight or nine, the family moved to nearby Fruitvale, settling on what they termed the "Mitchell acre". Mitchell loved to read as a child, with friends calling him a "bookworm". After graduating high school, Mitchell worked briefly during the fall of 1971 pouring lead slag at the Cominco smelter—the dominant industry in Trail, known simply as "the hill".

=== Simon Fraser University ===
While working at Cominco, Mitchell called Simon Fraser University, which agreed to admit him despite the non-traditional start date. Within days, he had quit the smelter and was taking classes in political science, sociology, anthropology, English and math.

In 1972, however, after only a year of classes, Mitchell dropped out. From then until 1976 he worked in a variety of labour positions in the British Columbia forest, mining, food, and service sectors, including as a first-aid attendant for a diamond-bit drilling operation as part of a dam project in Revelstoke. From 1976 to 1978, he worked as the retail store manager for Agora Co-operative Foods in Vancouver, and in 1978 he joined the Collective Resources and Services (CRS) Workers' Co-op. Mitchell worked at CRS as a bread baker for their bakery Uprising Breads, and as a planner. In a 1979 profile on food coops in The Vancouver Sun, Mitchell called the employee-controlled business model satisfying, and said that "At least, in a small way, we support the things we want to." Working at CRS in 1980, Mitchell also met his life partner Dilys Bowman, who worked in the warehouse.

By 1982, Mitchell had begun to recognise a need for business skills. He thus again applied to Simon Fraser, this time to study business, and was again accepted on short notice—something for which he remained grateful. (Note: In a profile in 2012, he reflected that "SFU allows people who aren't on traditional patterns to deeply engage with the school ... Twice, ...the university let me in at non-normal times. During that fall of 1971, I was working at the smelter in Trail, and when I called them they said sure, they would let me in. Just that fact that they would open up and let me in. In the fall of 1981, it was the same story — they let me in while I continued to work.") "The university appealed to me", he later said, "because of its radicalism". "It was young, and people there were doing interesting things." He re-enrolled on a part-time basis, later switching to full time. He also continued to work; he remained at CRS until 1983, and then worked as a commercial loans officer at the CCEC Credit Union from 1983 to 1984.

During his second period at Simon Fraser, Mitchell became intrigued by management research. Recalling in-depth conversations with faculty such as Barry Schachter and Richard Schwindt, he later said that "The light bulb was going off for me". "I wanted to understand business as a scholar. This was a chance to understand what people are doing in business and what business does in the world." He also began working on research papers on topics related to the types of organisations at which he had worked after dropping out, such as coops, credit unions, deposit insurance, and planning. Mitchell graduated with honours in 1984, receiving a Bachelor of Business Administration and the Dean's Medal.

=== University of California, Berkeley ===
Shortly after graduation, Mitchell began a PhD program at the University of California, Berkeley—riding his motorcycle with Bowman from Vancouver down Interstate 5. He later credited the academic community there with introducing him to new tools and new perspectives. Mitchell's doctorate in business administration was conferred on 20 December 1988, with the thesis "Dynamic commercialization: An organizational economic analysis of innovation in the medical diagnostic imaging industry". The dissertation committee included David Teece as chair, as well as Glenn R. Carroll, Susan Bartlett Foote, and Richard Scheffler.

== Career ==
In 1988, the same year he graduated from Berkeley, Mitchell accepted a position as an assistant professor of corporate strategy at the School of Business Administration (later named the Ross School of Business) at the University of Michigan. In 1993 he became an associate professor and in May 1995 earned tenure. In May 1997 he became a full professor; he then chaired the department from 1998 to 2001. (Note: From 1999 Mitchell's title was professor of corporate strategy and international business, perhaps reflecting a change in the department name.) Effective 1 September 1999, he was appointed the Jack D. Sparks–Whirlpool Corporation Research Professorship of Business Administration. (Note: In appointing Mitchell to the Sparks–Whirlpool chair, dean B. Joseph White stated that Mitchell was "an accomplished researcher working in the area of business growth and survival in technology-intensive industries, emphasizing inter-firm linkages". "He has an extensive list of refereed publications in some of the most prestigious journals in his field. He was one of the key influences in the School reviewing and renovating our computing services area. His leadership of the Information Resources Committee led to improved computing services to faculty, staff, and students, upgrading classrooms to provide the latest video technology, and beginning a process of long-range strategic planning for future technology in the School.")

In July 2001, Mitchell joined the Fuqua School of Business at Duke University, becoming the J. Rex Fuqua Professor of International Management.

Over the 2011–2012 academic term, Mitchell taught at the Rotman School of Management as a visiting professor of strategic management. He was appointed the Anthony S. Fell Chair in New Technologies and Commercialization for the duration of his term. In a profile by Simon Fraser in 2012, Mitchell termed the position a "long planned homecoming" to Canada.

== Publications ==
- Mitchell, Will (1988). Dynamic commercialization: An organizational economic analysis of innovation in the medical diagnostic imaging industry (Ph.D.). Berkeley: University of California, Berkeley. OCLC 702885664.
- Mitchell, Will (June 1989). "Whether and When? Probability and Timing of Incumbents' Entry into Emerging Industrial Subfields". Administrative Science Quarterly. 34 (2). Ithaca, New York: Cornell Johnson Graduate School of Management: 208–230. JSTOR 2989896.

== Bibliography ==
- "1988: Build, Borrow, or Buy: Solving the Growth Dilemma". Ross School of Business. University of Michigan.
- Ahuja, Gautam (15 April 2022). "In Memory of Will Mitchell: Reflections by Gautam Ahuja". Strategic Management Society.
- Bowman, Dilys (2009). Commitment, connectivity and the neighbors: Greenway trail placement in North Carolina towns (Ph.D.). Chapel Hill: University of North Carolina at Chapel Hill. OCLC 1105760556.
- Carson, Cialyn (31 July 2023). "2022 Rotman Giving Day raises over $557,000 for the next generation of business leaders". Rotman School of Management. University of Toronto.
- Christoffersen, Susan (8 December 2021). "Remembering Will Mitchell". Rotman School of Management. University of Toronto. Archived from the original on 5 January 2024.
- "DGHI Welcomes New faculty, New Affiliate". Duke Global Health Institute. Duke University. 3 October 2008.
- "Essay Contest Winners". Health Management, Policy & Innovation. Business School Alliance for Health Management. 12 October 2026. Archived from the original on 10 November 2026.
- "The Faculty". The University of Michigan Bulletin. 18 (17). Ann Arbor: University of Michigan: 57–77. OCLC 635938223.
- Gambardella, Alfonso (15 April 2022). "In Memory of Will Mitchell: Reflections by Alfonso Gambardella". Strategic Management Society.
- Johnston, Jessica Leigh (1 May 2023). "Should You Build, Borrow, or Buy?". Rotman School of Management.
- Johnston, Jessica Leigh (2 September 2023). "Should You Build, Borrow, or Buy?". Forbes India.
- Lloyd, Noah (10 October 2023). "Northeastern professor Samina Karim receives prestigious award for career-defining paper — written 23 years ago". NGNResearch. Northeastern University.
- McGuffin, Ken (12 August 2021). "Rotman School Professor Honoured for His Contributions to the Field of Strategic Management". Rotman School of Management. University of Toronto.
- McNeill Reid, Alexander James (1978). My Family. Guilford, English: Privately printed. OCLC 314621859.
- Mooney, Scott; Dockins, Michelle (10 August 2023). "Michigan Ross Strategy PhD Students Awarded Prestigious Will Mitchell Dissertation Research Grant to Enhance Their Research Capabilities". Ross School of Business. University of Michigan.
- "Remembering Will Mitchell". Health Management, Policy & Innovation. Business School Alliance for Health Management. 20 January 2022.
- Strategic Management Society (21 April 2022). Remembering Will Mitchell Through What It Means to Be an Academic – via YouTube.
- Waters, Mark (27 September 2016). "Don't miss an opportunity to take advantage of the now permanent IRA Rollover rules". Pacific Crest Trail Association.
- "William D. Guth Distinguished Service Award". Academy of Management.
- "William Gordon Mitchell". Legacy.com. 27 December 2021.
- "Will Mitchell". Build, Borrow or Buy. 15 April 2022.
- "Will Mitchell Dissertation Research Grant Program". Strategic Management Society.
- "Will Mitchell Leadership in Healthcare Scholarship". University of Toronto.
- "Will Mitchell recognized with William D. Guth Distinguished Service Award". U of T Celebrates. University of Toronto. 25 August 2021.
- "Will Mitchell Student Essay Contest". Health Management, Policy & Innovation. Business School Alliance for Health Management.
- "Will Mitchell, University of Toronto". Business School Alliance for Health Management.
