= Cora Jane Flood =

American businessman

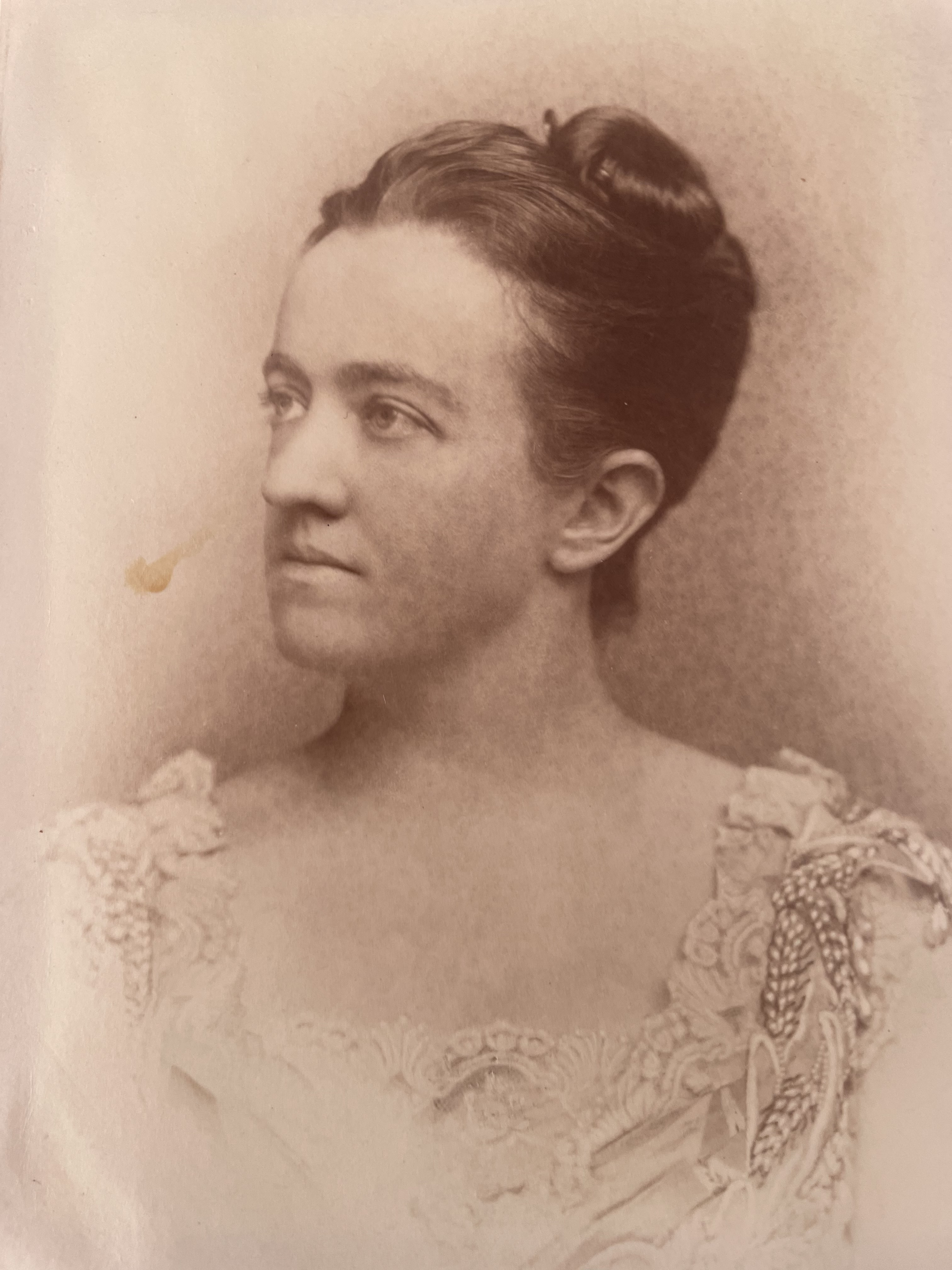
- Born: September 7, 1855; Sacramento, California, U.S.
- Died: November 1, 1928 (aged 73); San Francisco, California, U.S.
- Resting place: Cypress Lawn Memorial Park
- Occupation: philanthropist
- Known for: Contributing to the founding of Haas School of Business

Cora Jane Flood (1855-1928) was a philanthropist who played an integral role in founding what would become the Haas School of Business at the University of California, Berkeley.

Flood was a prominent resident of California and spent time in Kansas, Missouri, New York, and Europe at the turn of the twentieth century. The daughter of the prominent silver baron James Clair Flood, Cora "Jennie" Flood in 1898 presented what was then called Berkeley College with Lindenwood, in Menlo Park, California, to be dedicated to a "College of Commerce." This act marked the beginnings of the Haas School of Business, which at the time was the first business school at a public university in the United States and the second business school overall.

== Biography ==
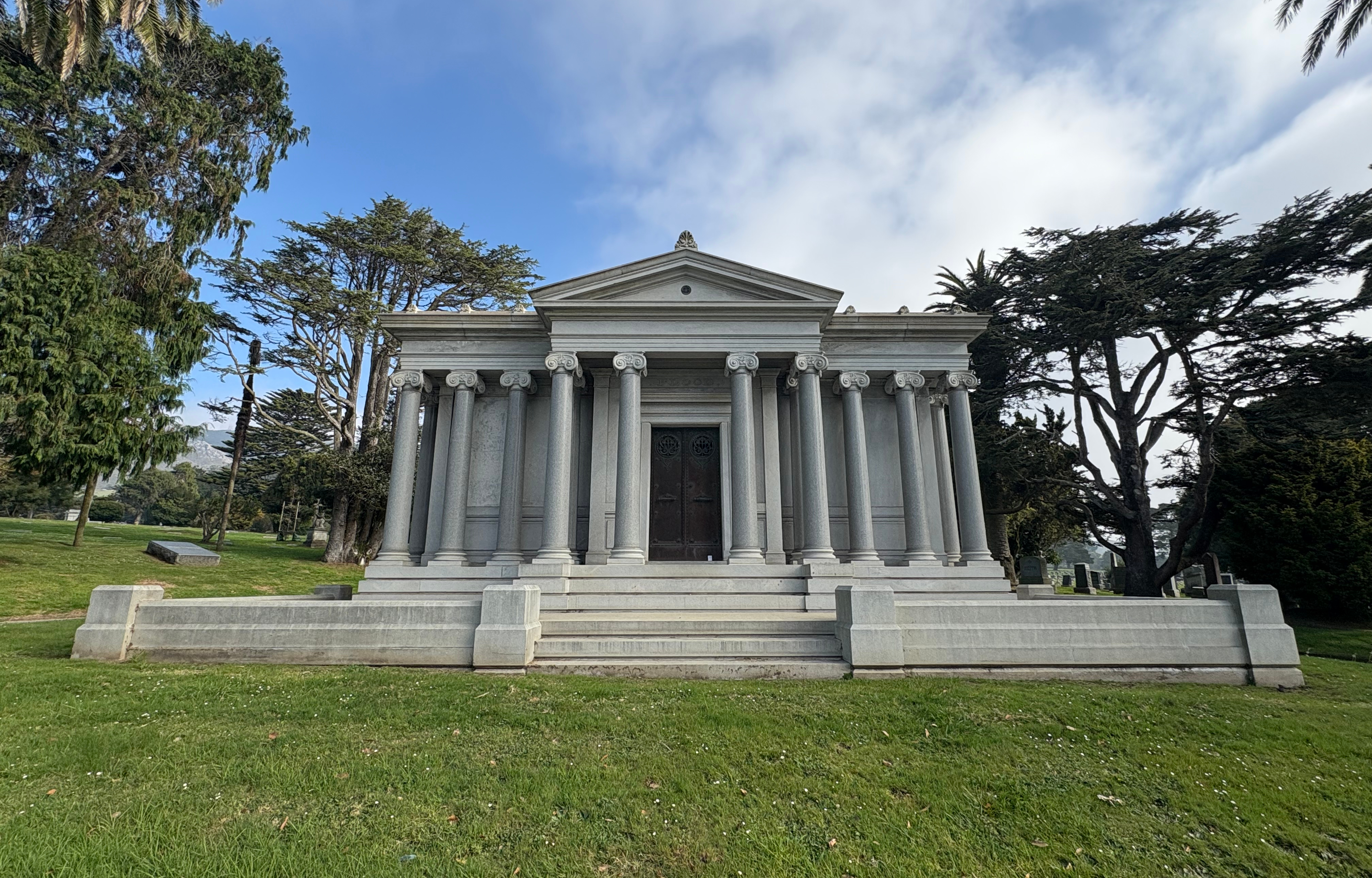
Flood mausoleum at Cypress Lawn Memorial Park

Cora Jane Flood was born in 1855 in Sacramento. According to her nephew, James Flood, she "just missed being born in a covered wagon." Jennie was educated by private teachers before entering the Notre Dame Convent in San Jose at the age of 13. Already at a very early age, Flood took a keen interest in the condition of her father's estate, becoming "occupied with the interests and excitement incident to the rising of the Flood fortunes." Her early years have been described as "sheltered."

In 1879, when she was in her early twenties, Flood was briefly courted by Ulysses S. Grant Jr., the second son of the recent president, who met Flood during a trip to California. Jennie Flood was later described in an account as "a handsome girl, intelligent and democratic." Grant did not follow through on earlier pledges, making the episode something of an "ill-fated love affair."

Flood has been described as "very close to her father" and often traveled to foreign countries with him. She was with him when he died in Heidelberg, Germany, on February 21, 1889. According to her nephew, her father was denied last rites by an Irish priest on the grounds that he had been a Mason. The incident irked Jennie to the point that she changed her faith to Episcopalianism.

Flood never married. All of her personal possessions were destroyed in the famous San Francisco fire of 1906. In 1915 Flood moved to New York to be closer to her brother's children. In 1918 she returned to the Bay Area.

In 1924 Jennie gave her own residence, 2120 Broadway—a gift from her brother, James Leary Flood, it today houses the Hamlin School — to the board of regents as a gift and granted the board permission to sell the property (which was done) and use the income for the benefit of the College of Commerce of the university. In her later years, her personal interests centered on her brother's children, particularly her young niece, Mary Emma Flood. Her personal philanthropies, bestowed mostly as gifts to individuals, had a beneficial impact on many people. She died in 1928 at age 73. She was interred at Cypress Lawn Memorial Park in Colma.

== Bequest to Berkeley College ==
Like her father, Jennie had "a tremendous respect for education." On September 13, 1898, Cora Jane Flood sent a missive to the Regents of the University of California. It read as follows:

Gentlemen: I hereby tender you the following property: the Flood residence and tract of about five hundred and forty acres near Menlo Park, California; one-half interest in about twenty-four hundred acres of marsh land adjacent to the residence tract, and four-fifths of the capital stock of Bear Gulch Water Company, which supplies water to Menlo Park and vicinity. The only conditions I desire to accompany this gift are that the residence and reasonable area about it, including the present ornamental grounds, shall be kept in good order for the period of fifty years and that the net income from property and its proceeds shall be devoted to some branch of commercial education.

Flood's remarkable gift occurred just a few weeks before the formal opening of the College of Commerce. Lindenwood had 60 rooms with 42 bedrooms, 18-foot ceilings, and a 150-foot tower. Flood's donation constituted the largest private gift to the university up to that time. The estimated value of the securities and real estate was $463,133.39 (with an equivalent value in 2013 of approximately $13.2 million). By 2013, the gift's value had grown to over $25 million, comprising one of the largest endowments on the Berkeley campus." Within the family the estate was called Linden Towers, characterized as a "snow white interpretation of baroque architecture"; the Berkeley community often referred to it as "Flood's Wedding Cake." Flood requested that Linden Towers continue to be painted white and its ornamental grounds preserved.
