= Charles Chatman =

American wrongfully convicted and imprisoned

Charles Chatman (born 1961) served 27 years in prison due to a wrongful conviction. He had been convicted in 1981 at the age of 20 of aggravated rape and sentenced to life in prison. He was released on 3 January 2008. Chatman became the 15th inmate from Dallas County since 2001 to be exonerated by DNA testing. He stated that race was a factor in his conviction. "I was convicted because a black man committed a crime against a white woman." Chatman was represented by Michelle Moore and Jeff Blackburn, attorneys for the Innocence Project of Texas.

== Artistic Responses to the Chatman Case ==
In 2009, New York City Poet Jeanann Verlee wrote "Resurrection," a poem written in the voice of Charles Chatman. The poem was broadcast on the August 31, 2009 Indiefeed Performance Poetry Podcast.

== See also ==
- List of wrongful convictions in the United States
