= Club Quarters =

American hotel chain

- Company type: Subsidiary
- Industry: Hotels
- Founded: 1994; 32 years ago
- Founder: Ralph Bahna
- Headquarters: Stamford, Connecticut, U.S.
- Number of locations: 15
- Area served: United States; United Kingdom
- Key people: John Paul Nichols (CEO)
- Website: www.clubquartershotels.com

Club Quarters Hotels is a boutique hotel chain headquartered in Stamford, Connecticut.

== Overview ==
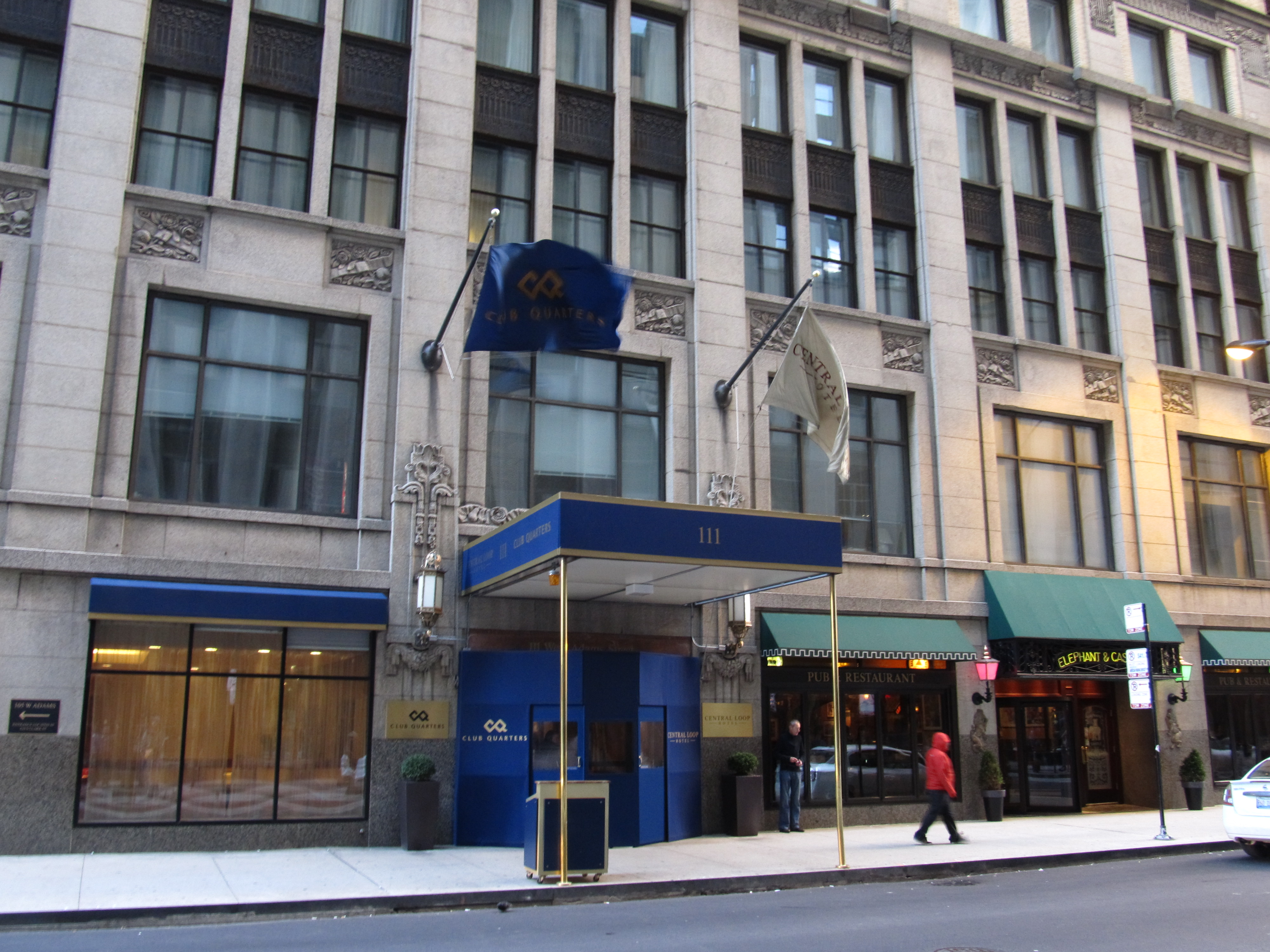
Club Quarters Hotel in Chicago

Club Quarters was founded by Ralph Bahna, who opened the first Club Quarters Hotel on West 45th Street in Midtown Manhattan in 1994. The chain has since opened overall 15 locations in New York City, London, Chicago, Boston, Philadelphia, Washington, D.C., Houston, and San Francisco.

== Brand Refresh ==
Since 2022–2023, Club Quarters has undergone a significant brand refresh, focusing on modernizing design, enhancing guest amenities, and upgrading technology across its properties. Two of its London properties, London City and St. Paul’s, were among the first to receive the new look, featuring updated “Club Living Rooms,” redesigned guest rooms, more curated communal spaces, and upgraded digital capabilities such as keyless entry and improved connectivity.

The hotel chain's digital key system is designed to help streamline the check-in process, and provide guests with a more secure and sustainable alternative to traditional key cards, and is compatible with both Apple and Android devices. The option for a digital key is available at all Club Quarters locations, making Club Quarters the first hotel chain to implement this technology at every one of its properties.

As part of this transformation, the company has emphasized its “bleisure” appeal—catering not just to business travelers but also to those combining leisure and work—while retaining its positioning in core business/cultural hubs.
