= Catherine A. Lesjak =

- Education: Stanford University (BS, Biology); Haas School of Business (MBA, Finance)
- Alma mater: Stanford University
- Occupation: CFO
- Employer: Hewlett Packard Company

Catherine "Cathie" A. Lesjak was the chief financial officer (CFO) of HP Inc. She became CFO of Hewlett‑Packard Company on January 1, 2007 and was the interim chief executive officer (CEO) from August 6, 2010 to November 1, 2010. During her tenure as interim CEO, HP paid a record 325 times EBITDA for 3PAR in a bidding war with Dell Computer. HP also paid 57 times EBITDA for ArcSight Inc. She served as senior vice president and treasurer of Hewlett-Packard Company since June 2003. Lesjak served as a director of Neoware Inc. since October 2007. Her salary for 2009 was $589,063.

Lesjak completed her bachelor's degree in biology (Stanford University) and her MBA in finance (Haas School of Business). Forbes magazine has ranked her 32nd among the world's 100 most powerful women.
