= Global Innovation Fund =

Non-profit investment fund

- Formation: 2014
- Type: Non-profit
- Registration no.: 1171353
- Headquarters: London, United Kingdom
- CEO (Acting): Joseph Ssentongo
- Website: https://www.globalinnovation.fund/

The Global Innovation Fund (GIF) is a non-profit investment fund. It invests in the development, testing, and scaling of social innovations with the potential to have a measurable impact on the lives of those living on less than $5 per day, such as new products, services, business processes, and policy reforms. It is headquartered in London with offices in Washington, D.C., Nairobi and Singapore.

== History ==
GIF was launched as an independent nonprofit in 2014 at the United Nations General Assembly (UNGA) meetings with a $200 million commitment from the UK's Department for International Development, the U.S. Agency for International Development, Australia's Department of Foreign Affairs and Trade, the Swedish International Development Agency, as well as The Omidyar Network.

GIF was founded "with the goal of creating an entity separate from government bureaucracy that could look at what different financing models can do for development". Its founding aim was to "pool capital to spur creative, pioneering interventions to tackle global development challenges". Alix Peterson Zwane was named as GIF's first CEO in 2015.

Former UK Prime Minister David Cameron announced the launch of GIF following the revision of the UK's foreign aid agenda, which pledged to uphold the UK government's commitment to spend 0.7% of Gross National Income (GNI) on Official Development Assistance and “a step-change in the effectiveness of the UK’s approach to aid”.

In 2024, GIF launched a "spinoff" subsidiary, GIF Growth, designed to help early growth-stage companies across the developing world to scale.

== Specialist funds ==
=== Innovating for Gender Equality ===
In 2019, GIF announced a new sub-fund focused on gender equality in partnership with Global Affairs Canada. The sub fund invests in “innovations that increase the agency of women and girls. Innovations in the fund work towards greater participation by women in decision making, prevention of violence against women and girls, and greater control over assets”.

=== Innovating for Climate Resilience and Adaptation ===
At the 2021 United Nations Climate Change Conference (COP26) in Glasgow, Scotland, GIF launched its Innovating for Climate Resilience fund, in partnership with the Adaptation Research Alliance and the Global Resilience Partnership and with seed funding from the UK Foreign, Commonwealth & Development Office.

This sub fund “invests, through grant, equity and debt instruments, in innovations with the potential to scale and support the world’s poorest to build resilience and adaptation”. In 2022, GIF announced the first innovations to receive investment from the Innovating for Climate Resilience fund: Agritask, a decision-support platform for agricultural operations which received investment of $3 million; and PLACE, a non-profit hyperlocal mapping organisation, which received a $460,000 grant.

=== GIF Growth ===
In 2024, GIF launched a “spinoff” subsidiary, GIF Growth, designed to help early growth-stage companies across the developing world to scale. The vehicle targets high-impact development projects in emerging markets, where access to funding and capital is often scarce, and aims to provide them with "long-term patient capital".

== Notable investments ==
GIF invested in the Series B funding round of Kenyan plastic recycling startup Mr Green Africa.

GIF invested in the Series A $7.5m funding round of WhereIsMyTransport, a London-based provider of data and technology solutions to improve public transport.

GIF invested in the $25m Series B funding round of OnlinePajak, a web-based tax application that allows taxpayers to perform calculations, payments, and tax reporting in a single platform.

GIF led in the Series B funding round of Nigerian mobile payments company Paga, which works to allow users to send, receive and pay bills using mobile platforms. GIF invested in the $6.3m Series A funding round of mClinica, a Singapore-based startup who provide healthcare data in Southeast Asia.

== Approach ==
=== Investment ===
GIF's aim is to support evidence-backed interventions impacting people living on less than $5 per day. GIF supports "new and innovative service delivery or management models, behavior-change tools, policies, processes and products, as well as innovative technologies" through investments in the range of $50,000 to $15 million. GIF uses a tiered financing approach to support the scaling of innovations, with funds being allocated depending on the stage of development.

- Pilot innovations are “at an early stage but have a credible plan for how they can be developed and tested in a real-world setting”.
- Test and Transition innovations “have already shown promise of success at a small scale, and have some information on operational, social, and financial viability which need to be solidified before they scale”.
- Scale innovations “have a clear evidence base and a credible plan for scaling to reach millions of people which is logistically, politically and financially feasible.”

=== Impact measurement ===
GIF uses a methodology called Practical Impact. This helps GIF to “forecast the impact of prospective investments and use this information to guide investment decisions”.

=== Singapore office ===
In June 2022 GIF announced the establishment of its Singapore office, stepping-up its commitment to backing Indo-Pacific innovators.
