= Diplôme d'études universitaires générales =

2-year French undergraduate degree

The Diplôme d’études universitaires générales (DEUG) (English: General Academic Studies Degree) was a French undergraduate degree awarded after two years of study. Introduced in 1973, it was offered by French universities as an intermediate qualification preceding the license (bachelor's degree) and was open to holders of the baccalauréat or an equivalent qualification.

The DEUG remained in use until the implementation of the Bologna Process reforms in the mid-2000s, which restructured French higher education into the license–master–doctorate (LMD) system. Following these reforms, the DEUG ceased to exist as a standalone national degree, though it may still be awarded in limited cases as an intermediate certification within certain bachelor’s degree programs.

== History ==
=== Creation ===
The DEUG was created in 1973 by the government department of Joseph Fontanet and replaced the various diplomas and undergraduate studies in each faculty: the general legal diploma, the general economic diploma, the degree of literary studies and the degree of scientific studies. According to the decree of creation, the DEUG "sanctions a multidisciplinary undergraduate general education and guidance" and states its "lessons aim to develop in students the skills and knowledge to: the expression and realization; understanding of the contemporary world, the study and use of concepts and scientific methods". Regarding the opportunities of this degree, "the lessons are organized to allow students who are studying to be admitted to a graduate or graduate, or at another university, students who do not pursue can directly enter the workforce". The courses leading to this degree spanned two years. The orders of the 1st of March 1973 split the agenda of the general university degree into six fields: law, economics, economic and social administration, humanities (with the sections philosophy, sociology, psychology, history and geography), science (with the sections science and structures of matter, and the natural sciences and life). All educational programs included 50% to 60% of the required courses defined by national law for each section. They also had at least 5% of modern language teaching and 30% to 40% over the choice of universities, with 10% to 20% of courses from outside the section or the main entry up to the choice of students, such as "sociology and social psychology" for students of the word "science". According to the statements, the total minimum teaching for this degree was 700 to 1,100 hours.

=== From 1993 to 1997 ===
Between 1993 and 1997, the DEUG was governed by the decree of 26 May 1992. It applied from the start of 1993 (Reform Jospin). The DEUG was open to any holder of the Baccalauréat or equivalent. It was organized into two levels. The lessons were grouped by modules. The first year included a tutorial. Universities had to organize two examination sessions per year. Only three annual applicants were allowed to graduate, with exceptions. Students of institut universitaire professionnalisé also received a DEUG at the end of their first year. The DEUG included ten areas:

- The Industrial Technology DEUG, whose program was determined by decree;
- The Sciences DEUG, whose program was determined by decree;
- The Arts DEUG, whose program was determined by decree;
- The Theology DEUG, whose program was determined by decree;
- The Social Sciences DEUG, whose program was determined by decree;
- The Arts and languages DEUG, whose program was determined by decree;
- The Law DEUG, whose program was determined by decree;
- The Economic and Social Administration DEUG, whose program was determined by decree;
- The Economics and Management DEUG, whose program was determined by decree;

The science and technology of sport and physical activity DEUG, whose program was determined by decree.

=== From 1997 to Bologna Process ===
Before the Bologna Process, the DEUG was governed by the decree of 9 April 1997. This has been applied since September 1997 (Bayrou reform). The DEUG was open to any holder of the Baccalauréat or equivalent. It was organized into four semesters, the first being a half of orientation. The lessons were grouped by academic units, and the first year included a tutorial. Universities had to conduct two examination sessions; Accession was made in the second year if the student had validated 70% of the first year (and 80% of DEUG enough to access the Bachelor, but did not get the degree). Only three annual applicants were allowed to graduate, with exceptions.

The DEUG included nine areas:

- The Science and Technology DEUG, whose program was determined by decree;
- The Arts DEUG, whose program was determined by decree;
- The Theology DEUG, whose program was determined by decree;
- The Social Sciences DEUG, whose program was determined by decree;
- The Arts and languages DEUG, whose program was determined by decree;
- The Law DEUG, whose program was determined by decree;
- The Economic and Social Administration DEUG, whose program was determined by decree;
- The Economics and Management DEUG, whose program was determined by decree;

The science and technology of sport and physical activity (sport science) DEUG, whose program was determined by decree.

=== Since Bologna Process ===
Since the implementation of the Bologna Process (2003 to 2006 depending on the university), the DEUG is a diploma acquired through the bachelor's degree. It is issued to students that successfully completed double degrees in the first four (out of six) semesters and received one diploma with both major fields. Areas and programs are no longer set nationally, but universities have often taken existing titles.
