= List of University of California, Berkeley faculty =

This page lists notable faculty (past and present) of the University of California, Berkeley. Faculty who were also alumni are listed in bold font, with degree and year in parentheses.

== By award ==
=== Nobel Prize ===
Faculty of the University of California, Berkeley

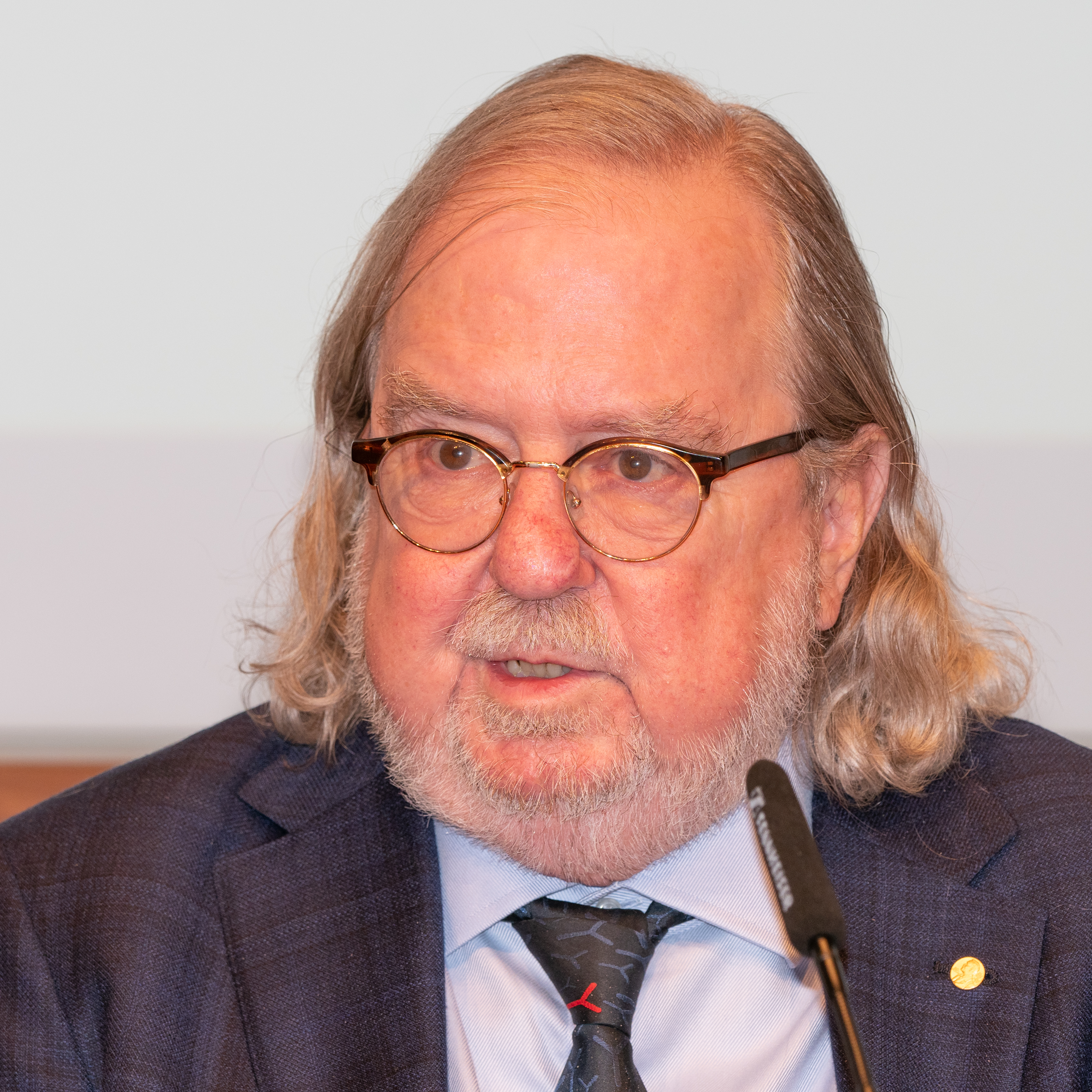
James P. Allison, Nobel laureate (2018, medicine)

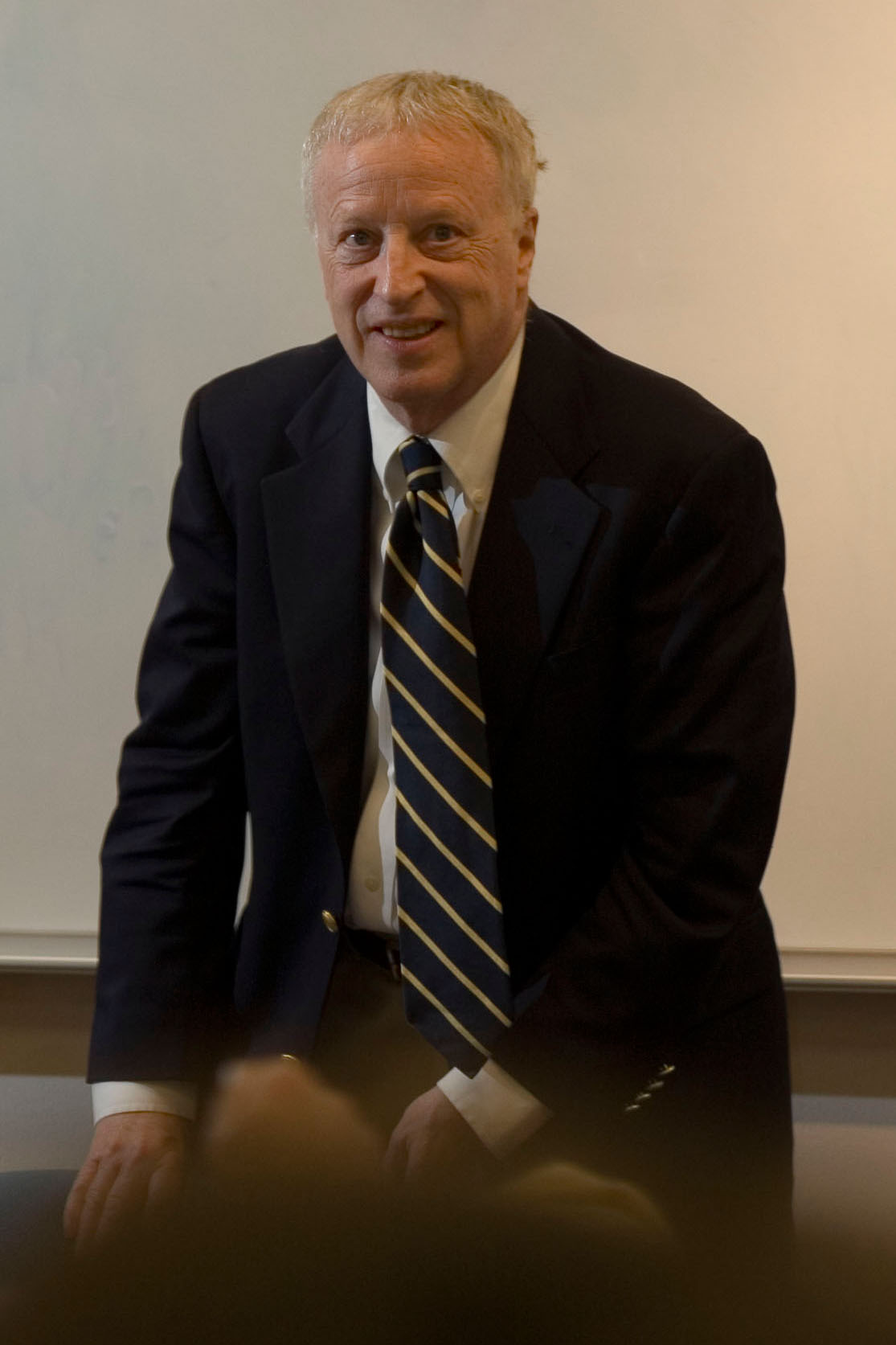
George Akerlof, Nobel laureate (2001, economics)

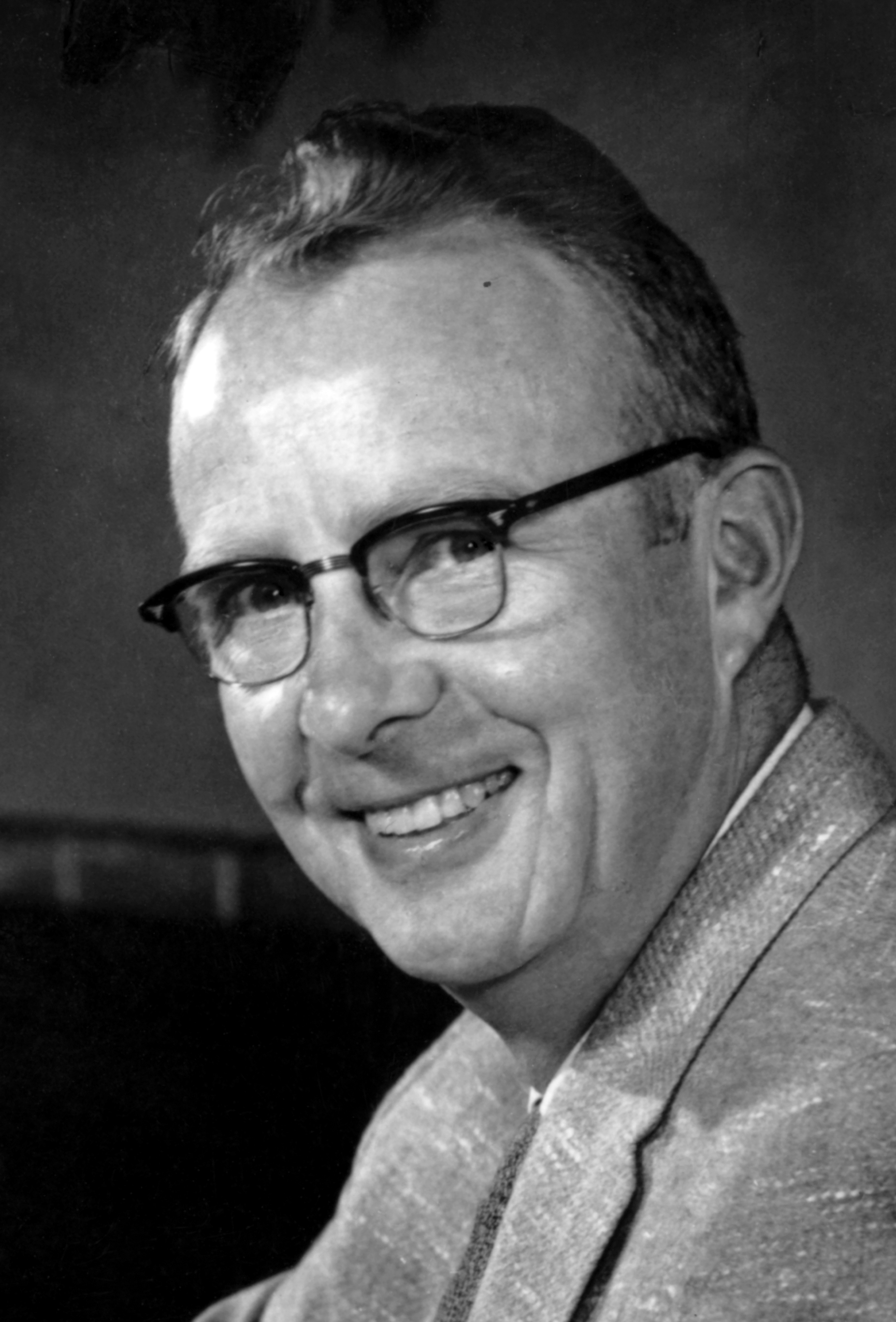
Luis Alvarez, Nobel laureate (1968, physics)

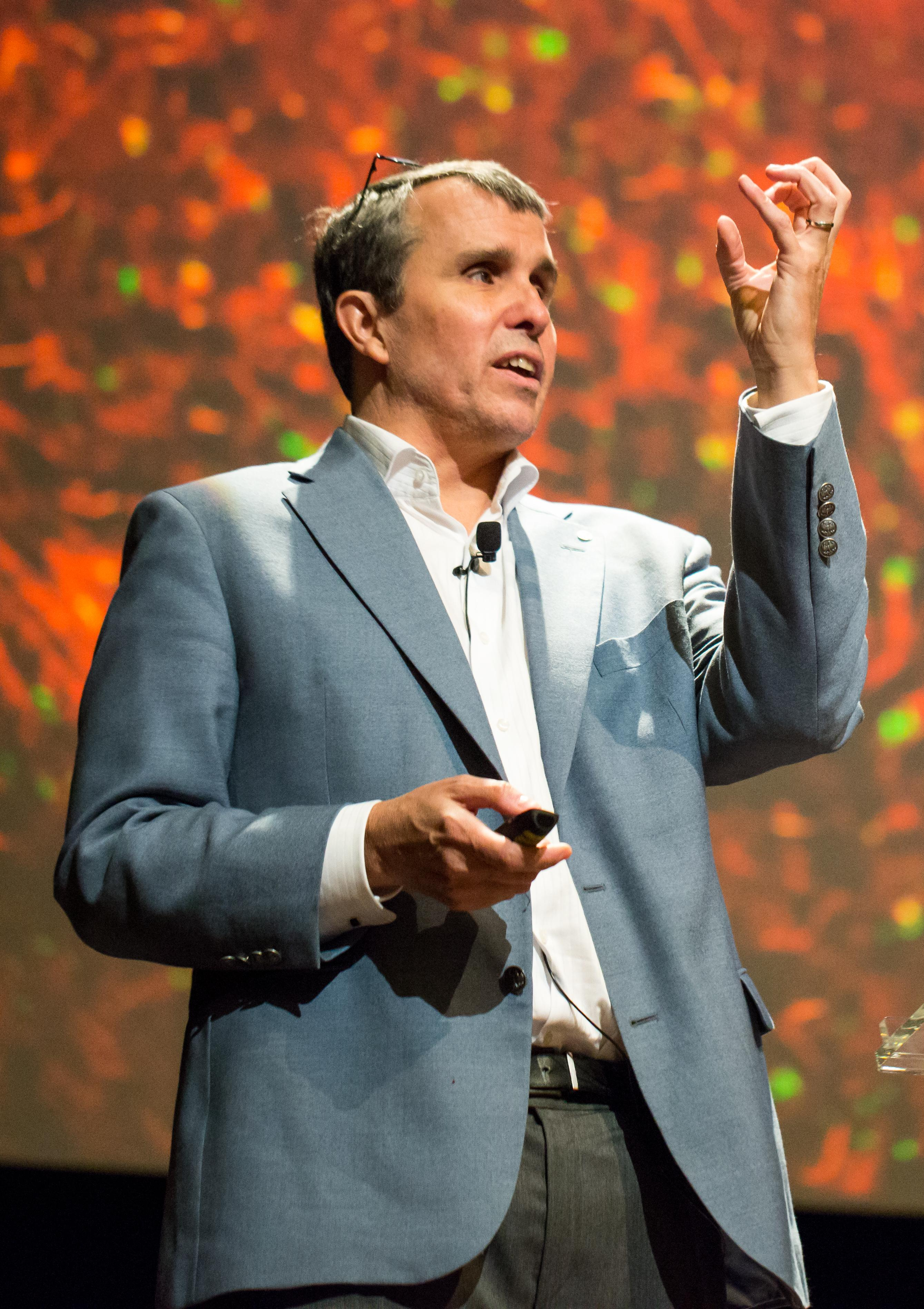
Eric Betzig, Nobel laureate (2014, chemistry)

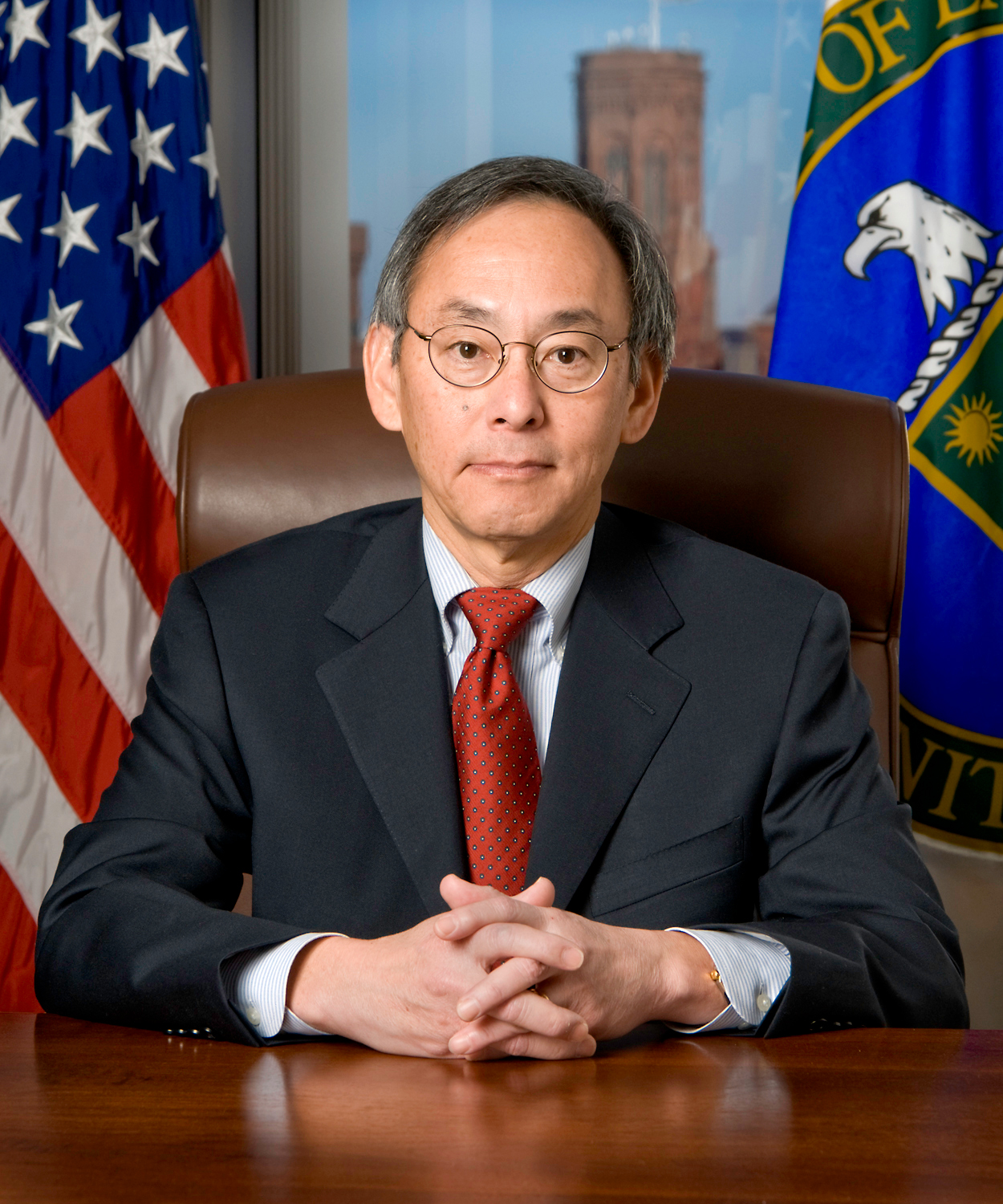
Steven Chu, Nobel laureate (1997, physics) and 12th United States Secretary of Energy

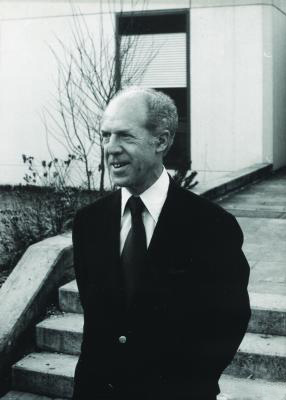
Gérard Debreu, Nobel laureate (1983, economics)

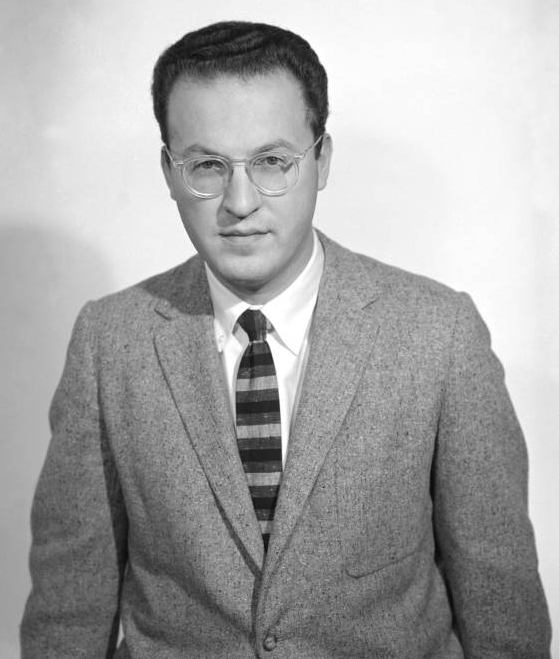
Donald A. Glaser, Nobel laureate (1960, physics)

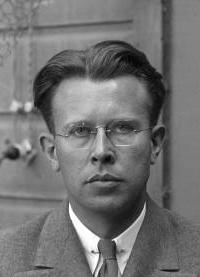
Ernest Lawrence, Nobel laureate (1939, physics)

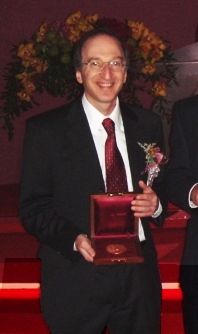
Saul Perlmutter, Nobel laureate (2011, Physics)

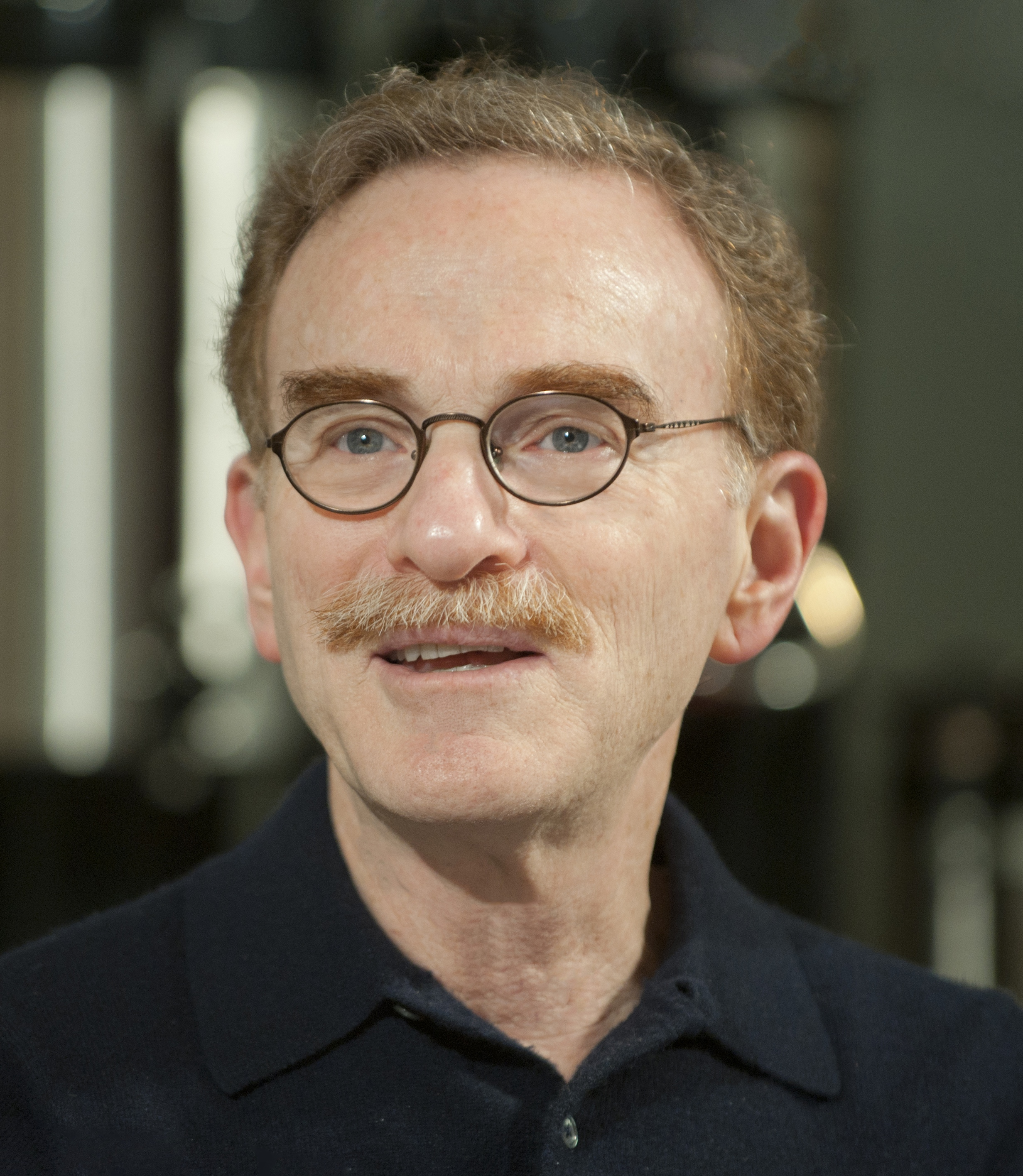
Randy Schekman, Nobel laureate (Physiology or Medicine, 2013)

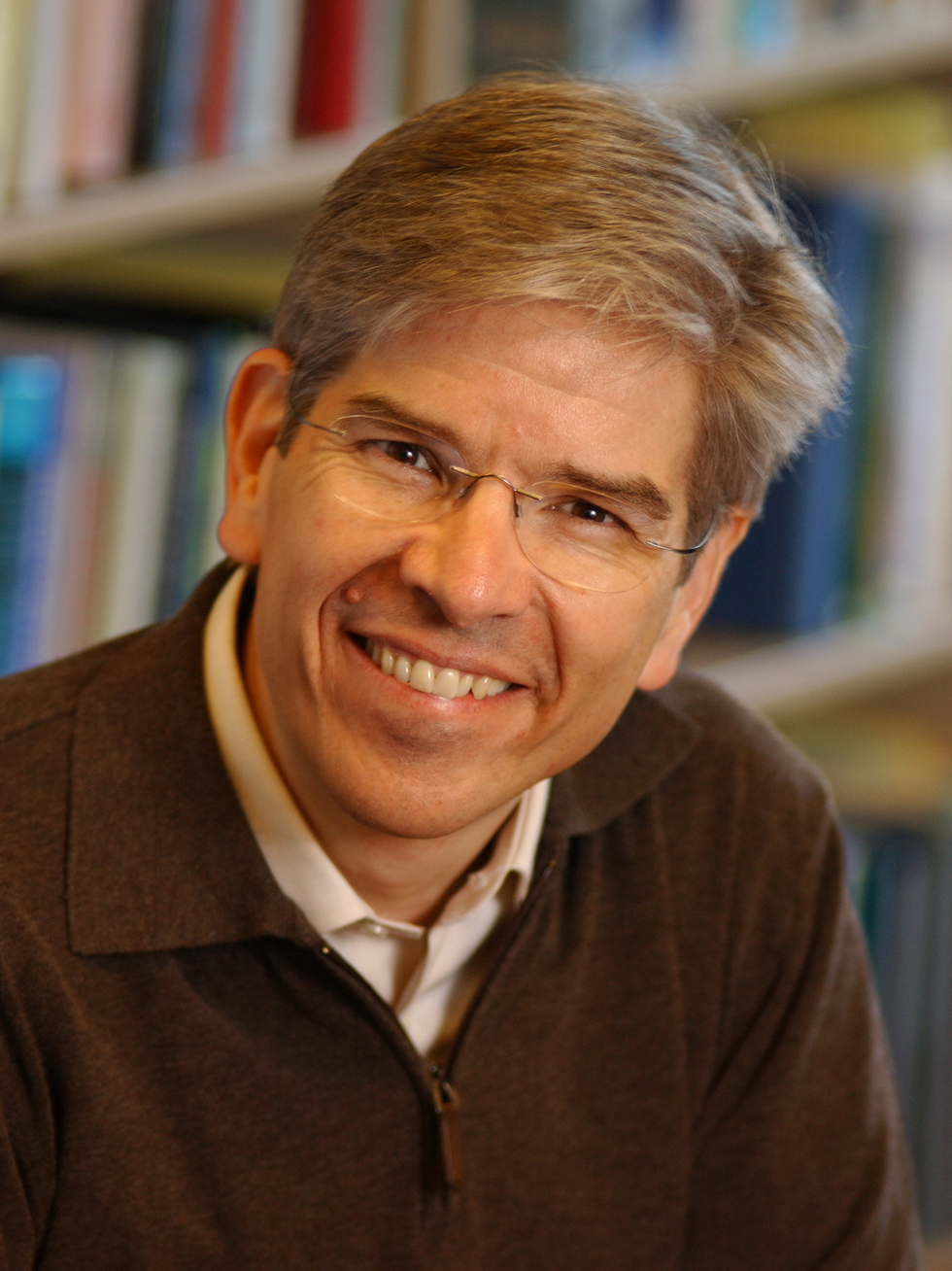
Paul Romer, Nobel laureate (2018, Economics)

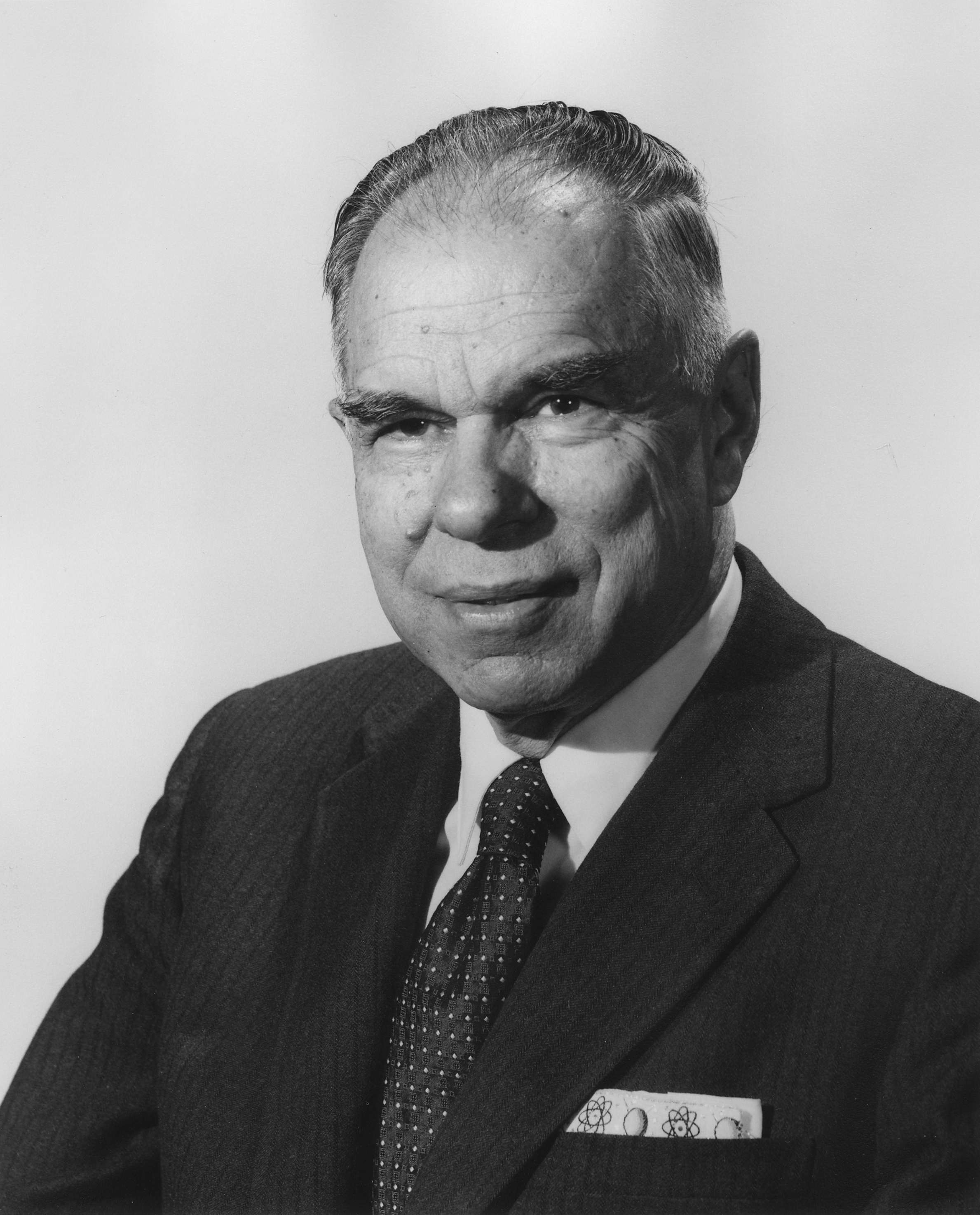
Glenn T. Seaborg, Nobel laureate (1951, Chemistry)

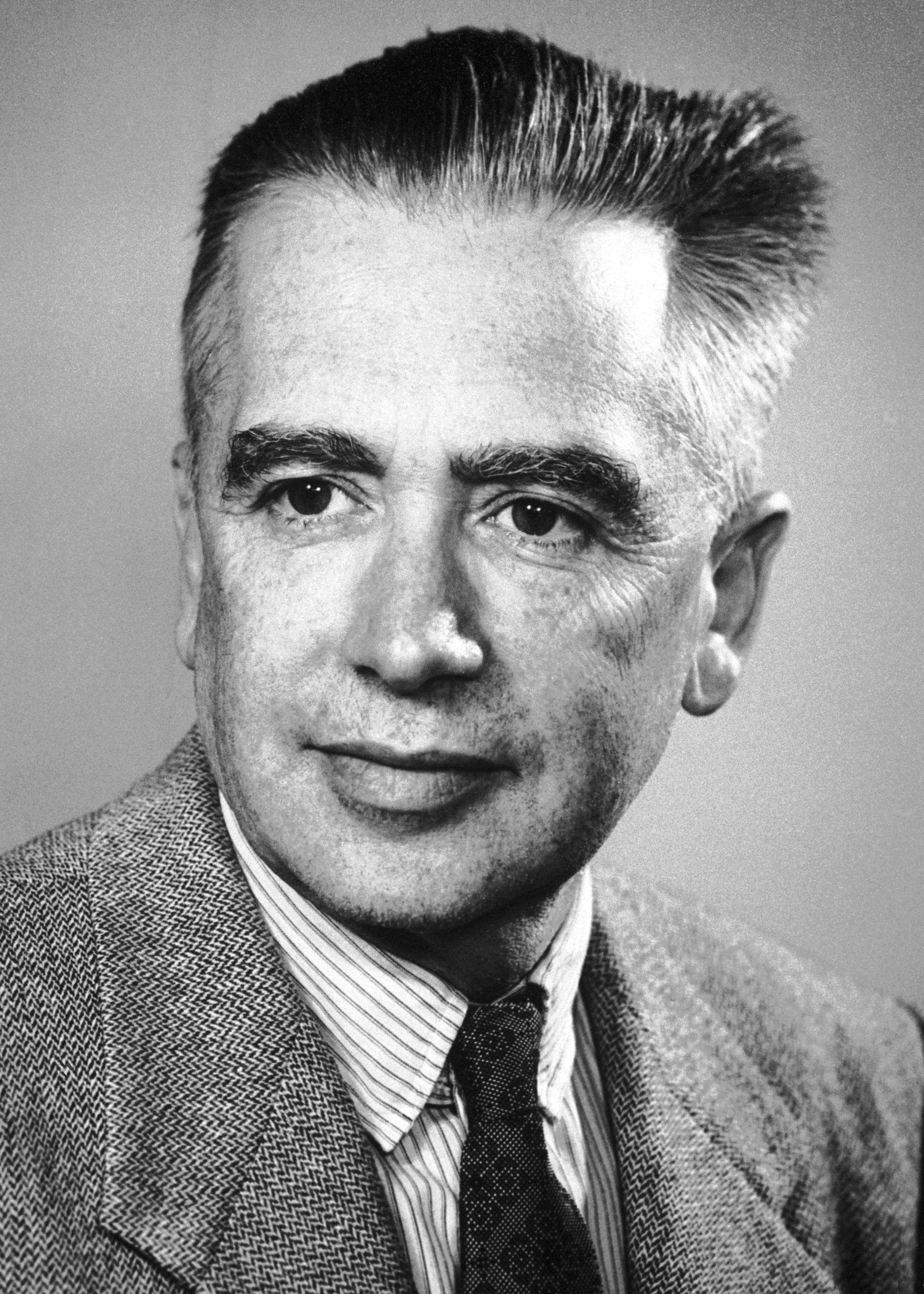
Emilio G. Segrè, Nobel laureate (1959, physics)

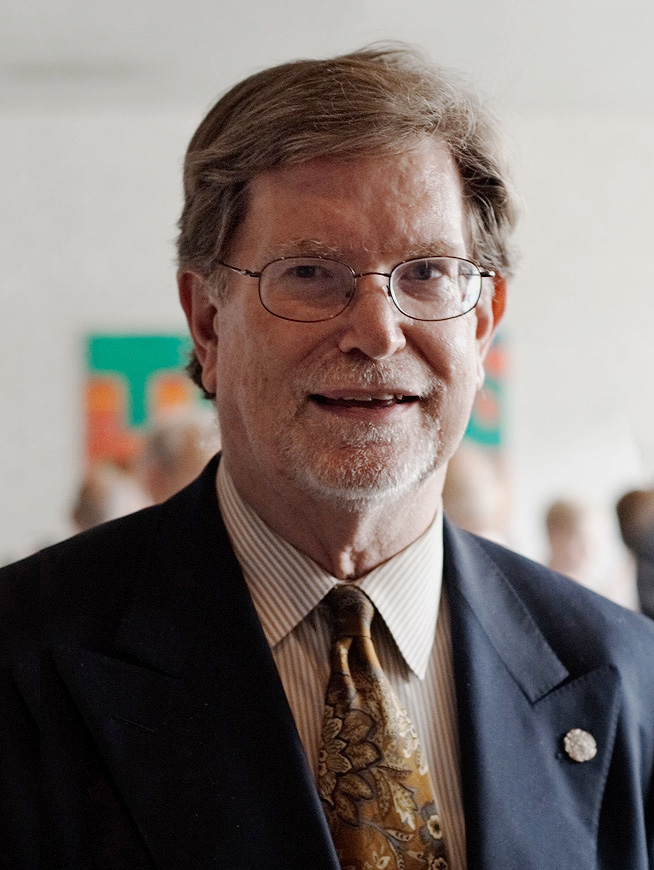
George F. Smoot, Nobel laureate (2006, Physics)

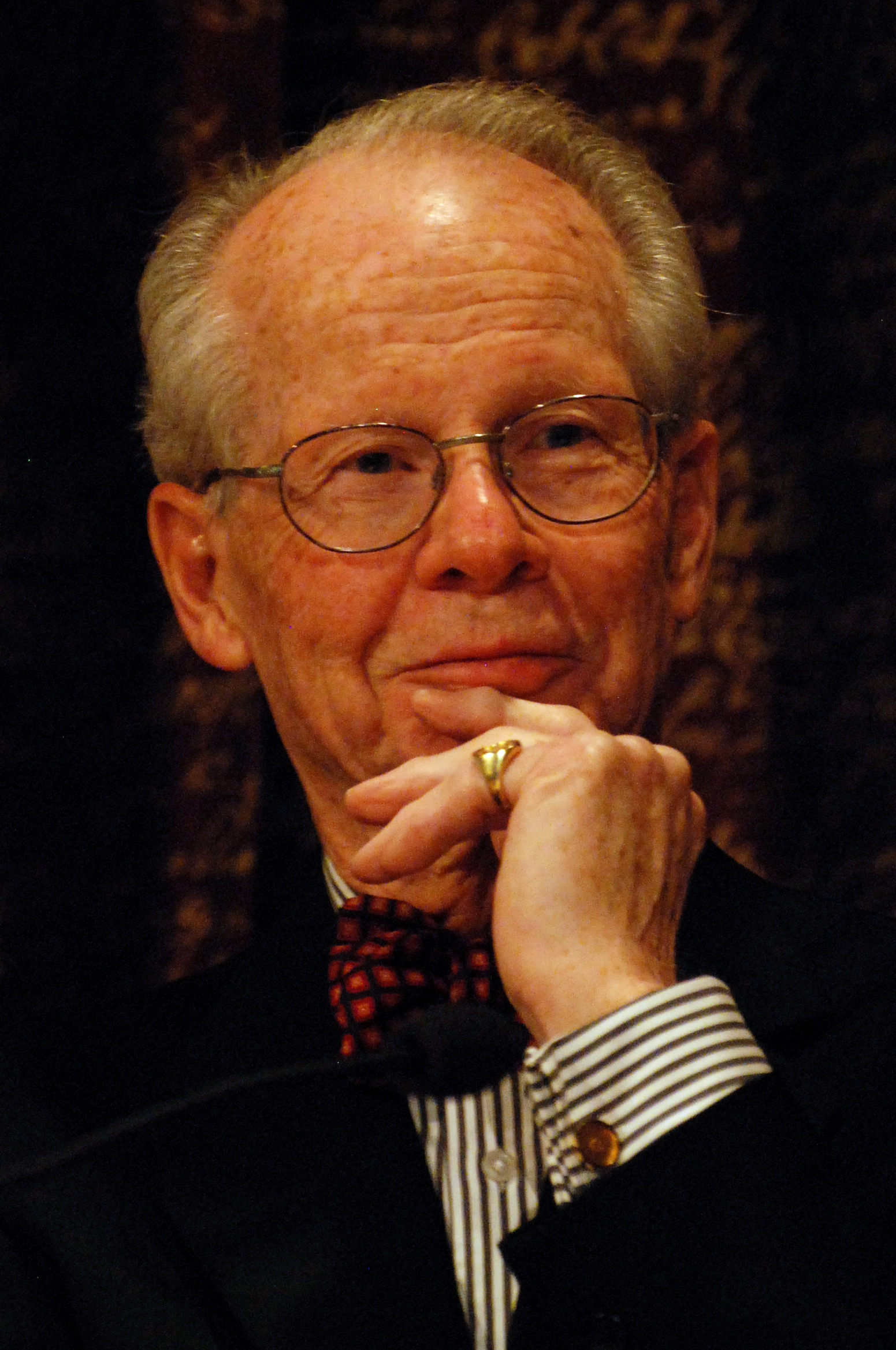
Oliver E. Williamson, Nobel laureate (2009, Economics)

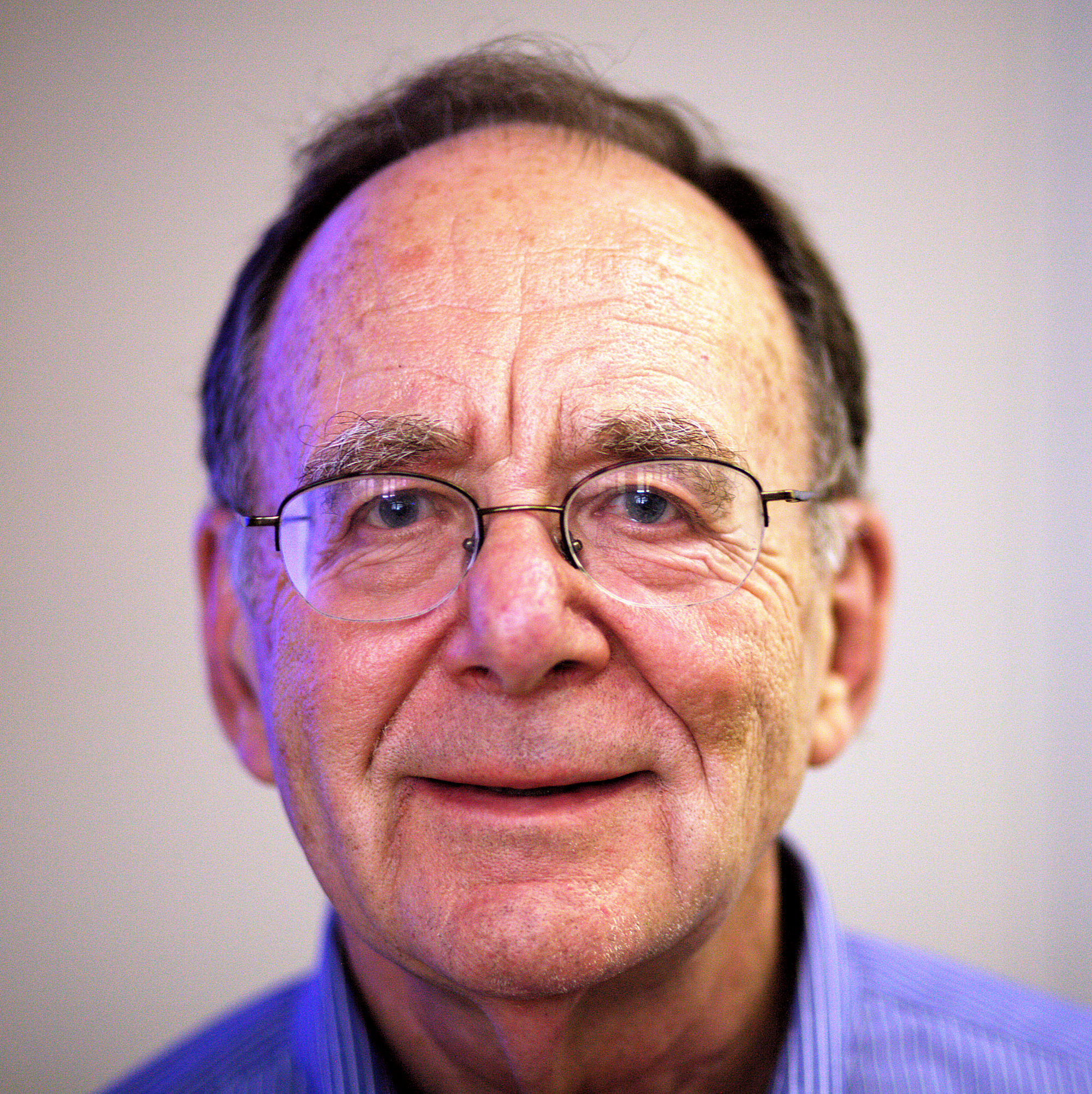
Richard Karp, 1985 Turing Award laureate

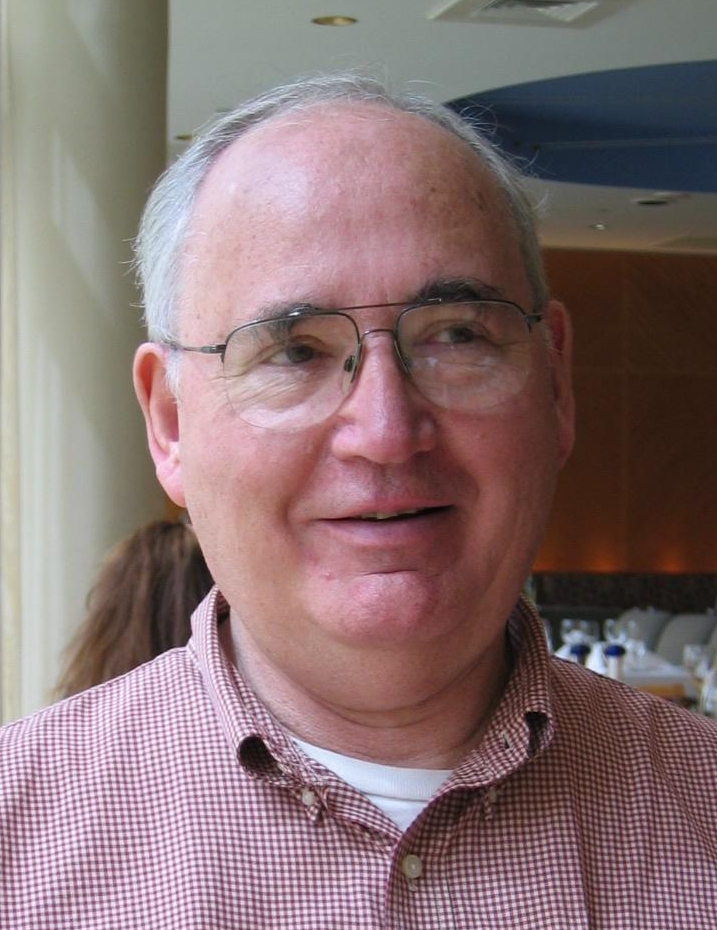
Dana Scott, 1976 Turing Award laureate

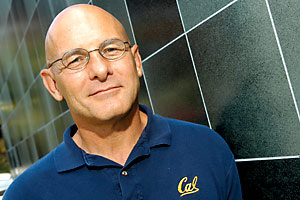
David A. Patterson, 2017 Turing Award laureate

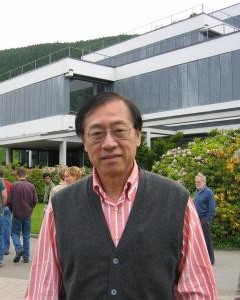
Andrew Yao, 2000 Turing Award laureate

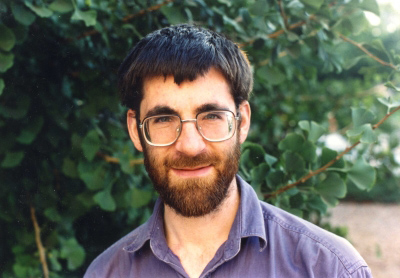
Richard Borcherds, recipient of the 1998 Fields Medal

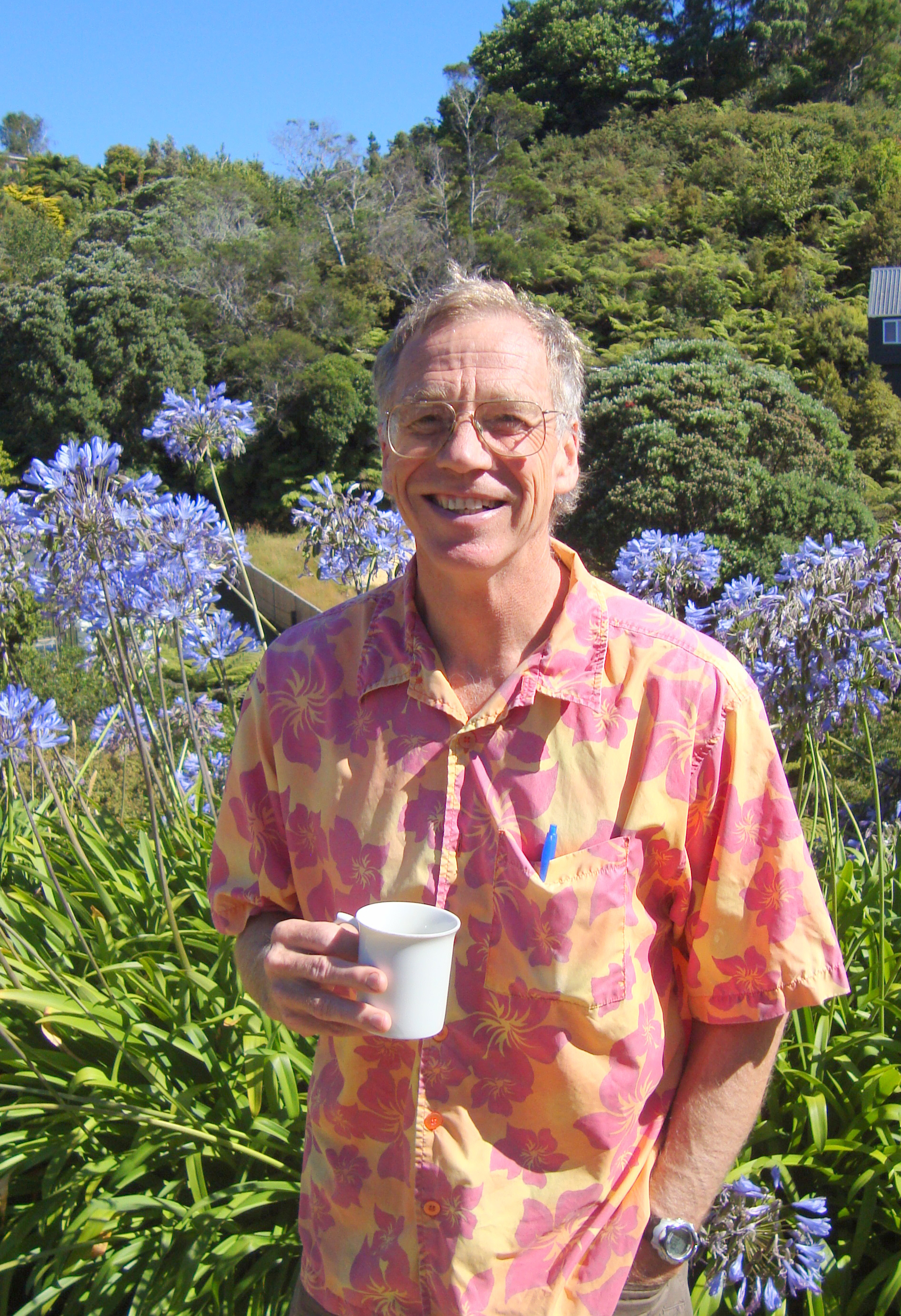
Michael Freedman, recipient of the 1986 Fields Medal

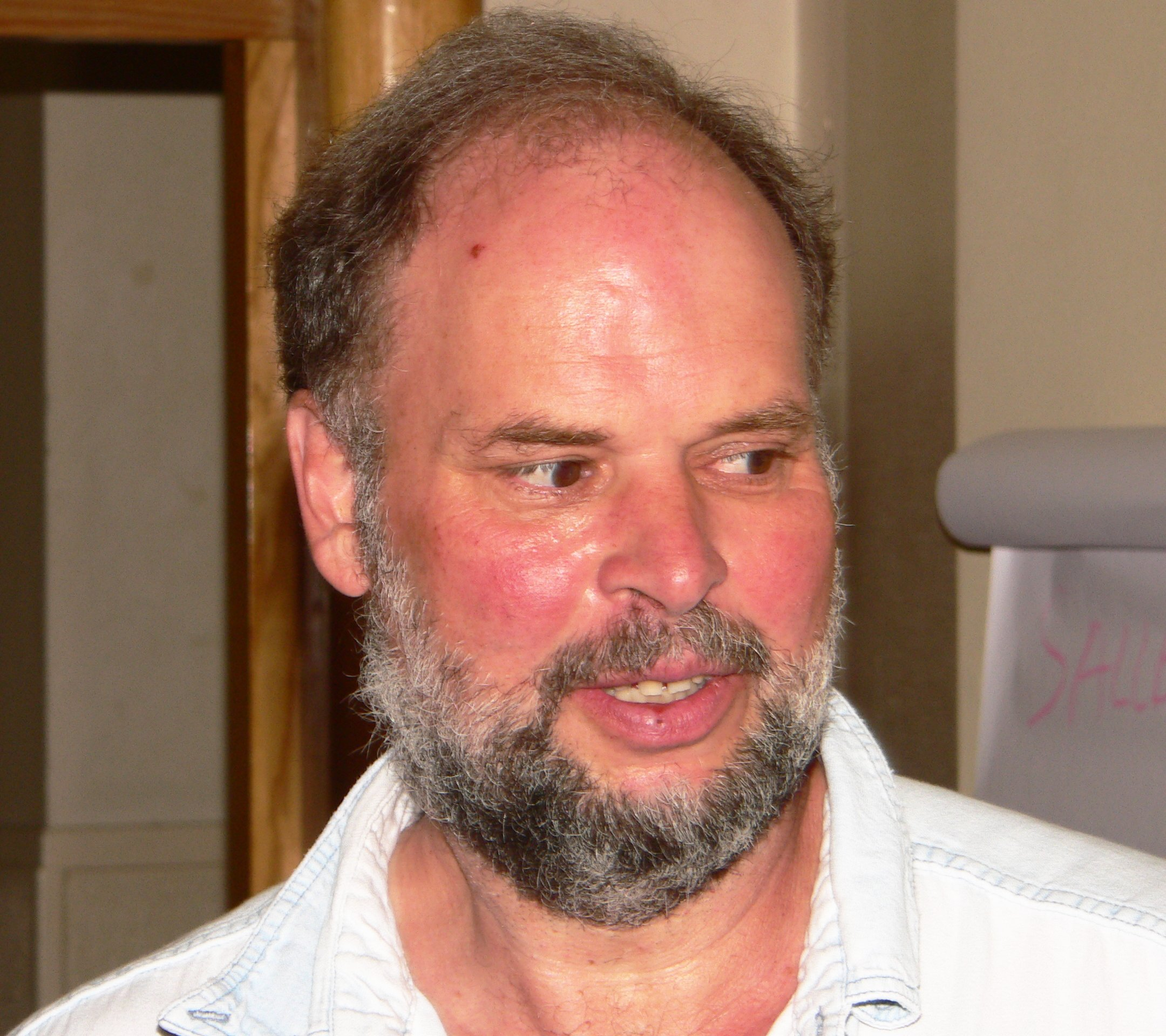
Vaughan Jones, recipient of the 1990 Fields Medal

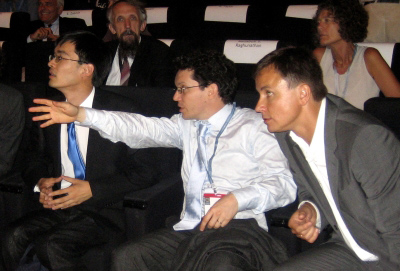
Andrei Okounkov (right), recipient of the 2006 Fields Medal

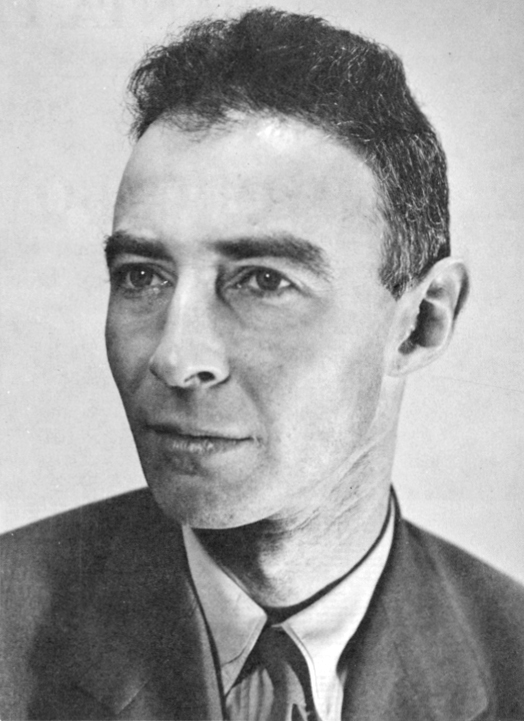
J. Robert Oppenheimer, father of the atomic bomb

- George A. Akerlof – professor of Economics (1980–2010); Nobel laureate (2001, economics) for the "analyses of markets with asymmetric information"
- James P. Allison – professor of Molecular and Cell Biology, director of the Cancer Research Laboratory (1985–2004); Nobel laureate (2018, Physiology or Medicine) for the "discovery of cancer therapy by inhibition of negative immune regulation"
- Luis Walter Alvarez – professor of Physics; Nobel laureate (1968, physics) "for his decisive contributions to elementary particle physics, in particular the discovery of a large number of resonance states, made possible through his development of the technique of using hydrogen bubble chamber and data analysis"
- **Carolyn R. Bertozzi** (Ph.D. 1993) – professor of Chemistry (1996–2015); Nobel laureate (2022, chemistry),"for the development of click chemistry and bioorthogonal chemistry"
- Eric Betzig – professor of Physics and Professor of Cell and Developmental Biology; Nobel laureate (2014, chemistry),"for the development of super-resolved fluorescence microscopy"
- Elizabeth Blackburn – associate professor (1978–1986), professor (1986–1990); Nobel laureate (2009, Physiology or Medicine) for the "discovery of how chromosomes are protected by telomeres and the enzyme telomerase"
- Melvin Calvin – University Professor of Chemistry, discovered Calvin Cycle; Nobel laureate (1961, chemistry), "for his research on the carbon dioxide assimilation in plants"
- Owen Chamberlain – professor of Physics; Nobel laureate (1959, physics) for the "discovery of the antiproton"
- **Steven Chu** (Ph.D. 1976) – professor of Physics, director of the Lawrence Berkeley National Laboratory (2004–2008); 12th U.S. Secretary of Energy; Nobel laureate (1997, physics), "for development of methods to cool and trap atoms with laser light"
- John F. Clauser – postdoctoral researcher (1969–1975), research physicist (1990–1997); Nobel laureate (2022, physics) "for experiments with entangled photons, establishing the violation of Bell inequalities and pioneering quantum information science"
- Gérard Debreu – professor of Economics and of Mathematics; Nobel laureate (1983, economics) "for having incorporated new analytical methods into economic theory and for his rigorous reformulation of the theory of general equilibrium"
- Jennifer Doudna – professor at the University of California, Berkeley (Ph.D. 1989) – Nobel laureate (2020, Chemistry) "for the development of a method for genome editing"
- Donald A. Glaser – professor of Molecular Biology and Professor of Physics; Nobel laureate (1960, physics) "for the invention of the bubble chamber"
- John C. Harsanyi – professor emeritus of Economics; Nobel laureate (1994, economics) for "pioneering analysis of equilibria in the theory of non-cooperative games"
- Ernest O. Lawrence – Nobel laureate (1939, physics) "for the invention and development of the cyclotron and for results obtained with it, especially with regard to artificial radioactive elements"
- **Yuan T. Lee** (Ph.D. 1962) – professor of Chemistry, Principal Investigator, Materials and Molecular Research Division, Lawrence Berkeley Laboratory; Nobel laureate (1986, Chemistry) for "contributions concerning the dynamics of chemical elementary processes"
- **Willard Libby** (B.S. 1931, Ph.D. 1933) – professor of Chemistry; Nobel laureate (1960, Chemistry) "for his method to use carbon-14 for age determination in archaeology, geology, geophysics, and other branches of science"
- Daniel L. McFadden – E. Morris Cox Professor Emeritus of Economics; Nobel laureate (2000, economics) "for his development of theory and methods for analyzing discrete choice"
- Edwin M. McMillan – professor of Physics, director of the Lawrence Berkeley Laboratory (1958–1972); Nobel laureate (1951, chemistry) for "discoveries in the chemistry of the transuranium elements"
- Czesław Miłosz – professor emeritus of Slavic Languages and Literature; Nobel laureate (1980, literature) "who with uncompromising clear-sightedness voices man's exposed condition in a world of severe conflicts"
- John H. Northrop – professor of Bacteriology and Medical Physics; Nobel laureate (1946, chemistry) for "preparation of enzymes and virus proteins in a pure form"
- Svante Pääbo – Postdoctoral researcher (1987–1990); 2022 Nobel laureate in Physiology or Medicine "for his discoveries concerning the genomes of extinct hominins and human evolution"
- **Saul Perlmutter** (Ph.D. 1986) – professor of Physics, co-discoverer of dark energy as head of the Supernova Cosmology Project; recipient of the Shaw Prize in Astronomy in 2006; Nobel laureate (2011, Physics) "for the discovery of the accelerating expansion of the Universe through observations of distant supernovae"
- Stanley B. Prusiner – professor of Virology in Residence; Nobel laureate (1997, Physiology or Medicine) "for his discovery of Prions, a new biological principle of infection" (known as the mechanism powering mad cow disease); recipient of the 1996 Wolf Prize in Medicine"for discovering prions, new class of pathogens that cause important neurodegenerative disease by inducing changes in protein structure"
- Paul Romer – professor of Economics; Nobel laureate (2018, Economics) "for integrating technological innovations into long-run macroeconomic analysis"
- Randy Schekman – professor of Molecular and Cell Biology; Nobel laureate (Physiology or Medicine, 2013) for "discoveries of machinery regulating vesicle traffic, a major transport system in our cells"
- **Glenn T. Seaborg** (Ph.D. 1937) – university professor of Chemistry, associate director of the Lawrence Berkeley Laboratory, chancellor of the UC Berkeley (1958–1961); Nobel laureate (1951, Chemistry) for "discoveries in the chemistry of the transuranium elements"
- Emilio G. Segrè – professor emeritus of Physics; Nobel laureate (1959, physics) for the "discovery of the antiproton"
- Herbert A. Simon – director of research (1939–1942), Nobel laureate (1978, Economics) "for his pioneering research into the decision-making process within economic organizations"
- George F. Smoot – Nobel laureate (2006, Physics) for the "discovery of the black body form and anisotropy of the cosmic microwave background radiation"
- Wendell M. Stanley – Nobel laureate (1946, chemistry) for the "preparation of enzymes and virus proteins in a pure form"
- Charles H. Townes – University Professor of Physics; Nobel laureate (1964, physics) "for fundamental work in the field of quantum electronics, which has led to the construction of oscillators and amplifiers based on the maser-laser principle"
- Oliver E. Williamson – professor emeritus of Business and Professor emeritus of Economics and Law; Nobel laureate (2009, Economics), for "work in economic governance, especially the boundaries of the firm"

=== Turing Award ===
- Manuel Blum – professor of Computer Science (1995–2001) and recipient of the 1995 Turing Award, for "his contributions to the foundations of computational complexity theory and its application to cryptography and program checking"
- Stephen Cook – professor of mathematics (1966–1970), recipient of the 1982 Turing Award "for his advancement of our understanding of the complexity of computation in a significant and profound way"
- Edward Feigenbaum – professor (1960–1965), recipient of the 1994 Turing Award "for pioneering the design and construction of large scale artificial intelligence systems, demonstrating the practical importance and potential commercial impact of artificial intelligence technology"
- William Kahan – professor of Mathematics and Electrical Engineering and Computer Science (1968–present), primary architect behind the IEEE 754 standard for floating-point computation, and recipient of the 1989 Turing Award, for "his fundamental contributions to numerical analysis. Kahan has dedicated himself to "making the world safe for numerical computations"
- Richard Karp – professor of Computer Science, Mathematics, and Operations Research (1968–present), and recipient of the 1985 Turing Award For "his continuing contributions to the theory of algorithms including the development of efficient algorithms for network flow and other combinatorial optimization problems, the identification of polynomial-time computability with the intuitive notion of algorithmic efficiency, and, most notably, contributions to the theory of NP-completeness. Karp introduced the now standard methodology for proving problems to be NP-complete which has led to the identification of many theoretical and practical problems as being computationally difficult"
- David A. Patterson – professor of computer science (1976–2016) and Pardee Professor of Computer Scientist, emeritus, at UC Berkeley; distinguished engineer at Google; pioneer of RISC computer design and RAID storage systems; 2017 Turing Award "for pioneering a systematic, quantitative approach to the design and evaluation of computer architectures with enduring impact on the microprocessor industry"
- **Dana Scott**, B.S. 1954 – computer scientist, co-recipient of the 1976 Turing Award with Michael O. Rabin, for "the joint paper (with Rabin) "Finite Automata and Their Decision Problem", which introduced the idea of nondeterministic machines, which has proved to be an enormously valuable concept. Their (Scott & Rabin) classic paper has been a continuous source of inspiration for subsequent work in this field"; former associate professor of Math at UC Berkeley (1960–1962); professor emeritus at Carnegie Mellon University
- Herbert A. Simon – director 1939–1942, co-recipient of the 1975 Turing Award for "basic contributions to artificial intelligence, the psychology of human cognition, and list processing", and Nobel laureate (1978, Economics) "for his pioneering research into the decision-making process within economic organizations"
- Michael Stonebraker – professor at UC Berkeley for 29 years, recipient of the 2014 Turing Award "for fundamental contributions to the concepts and practices underlying modern database systems"
- Ivan Sutherland – visiting scholar in Computer Science (2005–2008), recipient of the 1988 Turing Award "for his pioneering and visionary contributions to computer graphics, starting with Sketchpad, and continuing after"
- Robert Tarjan – computer scientist, professor at UC Berkeley (1973–1975), recipient of the 1986 Turing Award "for fundamental achievements in the design and analysis of algorithms and data structures"
- Andrew Yao – professor of Computer Science at UC Berkeley (1981–1982); 2014 visiting scientist at the Simons Institute for the Theory of Computing at UC Berkeley; currently Distinguished Professor at Large at the Chinese University of Hong Kong;Turing Award (2000) "in recognition of his fundamental contributions to the theory of computation, including the complexity-based theory of pseudorandom number generation, cryptography, and communication complexity"

=== Academy Award ===
- Mark Berger, B.A. 1964 – recipient of four Academy Awards for sound mixing and adjunct professor at UC Berkeley
- John Dykstra – staff researcher (c. 1973–1975) at UC Berkeley's Institute of Urban and Regional Development, which developed computer-controlled cameras and associated technologies that were adapted for the groundbreaking special effects in Star Wars and later films); Academy Award for Best Visual Effects for Star Wars (1977); 1978 Academy Award for Technical Achievement "for the development of the Dykstraflex Camera" for Star Wars (1977); Academy Award for Best Visual Effects for Spider-Man 2 (2004)
- Jon H. Else, B.A. 1968 – nominated twice for the Academy Award (for the documentaries The Day After Trinity and Arthur and Lillie), cinematographer on the Academy Award–winning Who Are the DeBolts? And Where Did They Get Nineteen Kids?; Prix Italia recipient (The Day After Trinity), recipient of four Emmy Awards, 1999 winner of the Sundance Film Festival Filmmaker's Trophy, MacArthur Genius Grant Fellow, professor of journalism at UC Berkeley

=== Fields Medal ===
- Richard Borcherds – professor of Mathematics; 1998 Fields medalist
- Jean Bourgain – visiting scholar (2012–2014); 1994 Fields medalist
- **Michael Freedman** (attended 1967–1968) – Lecturer (1973–1975); 1986 Fields medalist
- Vaughan Jones – professor of Mathematics; 1990 Fields medalist
- Maxim Kontsevich – professor of Mathematics; 1998 Fields medalist
- Elon Lindenstrauss – visiting Miller Professor; 2010 Fields medalist
- Curtis T. McMullen – professor of Mathematics; 1990 Fields medalist
- Andrei Okounkov – Assistant Professor of Mathematics; 2006 Fields medalist
- Grigori Perelman – Miller Research Fellow; 2006 Fields medalist
- Peter Scholze – Chancellor's Professor (2014); 2018 Fields medalist
- Stephen Smale – professor emeritus of Mathematics; 1966 Fields medalist
- **William Thurston** (PhD 1972) – professor of Mathematics (1991–1996); director of the Mathematical Sciences Research Institute; 1982 Fields medalist
- Cédric Villani – visiting professor; 2010 Fields medalist

=== Pulitzer Prize ===
- Geeta Anand – professor and dean at the UC Berkeley Graduate School of Journalism; 2003 Pulitzer Prize for Explanatory Reporting
- Ben Bagdikian – dean of the Graduate School of Journalism (1985–1988); 1953 Pulitzer Prize for Local Reporting
- David Barstow – Reva and David Logan Distinguished Chair in Investigative Journalism at the UC Berkeley Graduate School of Journalism; 2004 Pulitzer Prize for Public Service, 2009 and 2013 Pulitzer Prize for Investigative Reporting, 2019 Pulitzer Prize for Explanatory Reporting
- Lowell Bergman – Emeritus Reva and David Logan Distinguished Chair in Investigative Journalism at the UC Berkeley Graduate School of Journalism; 2004 Pulitzer Prize for Public Service
- Robert Hass – professor of English; 2008 Pulitzer Prize for Poetry
- **Leon Litwack** (BA 1951, PhD 1958) – professor emeritus of History; 1979 Pulitzer Prize for History
- Walter A. McDougall – professor; 1986 Pulitzer Prize for History
- **T. Christian Miller** (BA 1992) – lecturer at the UC Berkeley Graduate School of Journalism; 2016 Pulitzer Prize in Exploratory Journalism
- Richard Ofshe – professor emeritus of Sociology; whose work won the Pulitzer Prize for Public Service

=== Wolf Prize ===
- **Paul Alivisatos** (Ph.D. 1986) – professor of Chemistry and Materials Science and Professor of Nanotechnology; recipient of the 2012 Wolf Prize in Chemistry, for the development of "the colloidal inorganic nanocrystal as a building block of nanoscience making fundamental contributions to controlling the synthesis of these particles, to measuring and understanding their physical properties, and to utilizing their unique properties for applications ranging from light generation and harvesting to biological imaging"
- James P. Allison – professor at UC Berkeley (1985–2004); 2017 Wolf Prize in Medicine "for sparking a revolution in cancer therapy through (his) discovery of immune checkpoint blockade"
- Robert G. Bergman – professor of chemistry (1977–present) at UC Berkeley; 2017 Wolf Prize in Chemistry "for the discovery of the activation of C-H bonds of hydrocarbons by soluble transition metal complexes"
- **Carolyn R. Bertozzi** (Ph.D. 1993) – professor of chemistry (1996–2015); 2022 Wolf Prize in Chemistry for "seminal contributions to understanding the chemistry of cellular communication and inventing chemical methodologies to study the role of carbohydrates, lipids, and proteins in such biological processes"
- John Casida – recipient of the Wolf Prize (1993, Agriculture) "for his pioneering studies on the mode of action of insecticides, design of safer pesticides and contributions to the understanding of nerve and muscle function in insects"
- Shiing-Shen Chern – recipient of the Wolf Prize (1983, Mathematics), "'for outstanding contributions to global differential geometry, which have profoundly influenced all mathematics"
- John Clauser – professor (1969–1996) of quantum physics at UC Berkeley, known for the Clauser-Horne-Shimony-Holt inequality and the first observations of quantum entanglement, recipient of the 2010 Wolf Prize in Physics for "fundamental conceptual and experimental contributions to the foundations of quantum physics, specifically an increasingly sophisticated series of tests of Bell's inequalities or extensions there of using entangled quantum states"
- Jennifer Doudna – Li Ka Shing Chancellor's Chair in Biomedical and Health Sciences, professor of Molecular and Cell Biology, and Professor of Chemistry at Berkeley; recipient of the 2022 Wolf Prize in Chemistry, "for revealing the medicine-revolutionizing mechanism of bacterial immunity via RNA-guided genome editing"
- Phillip Griffiths (professor 1962–1967) – mathematician, recipient of the Wolf Prize (2008, Mathematics), "for his work on variations of Hodge structure; the theory of periods of abelian integrals; and for his contributions to complex differential geometry"; former professor at UC Berkeley
- Erwin Hahn – recipient of the Wolf Prize (1983/1984, Physics) "for his discovery of nuclear spin echoes and for the phenomenon of self-induced transparency"
- **John F. Hartwig** (Ph.D. 1990) – 2019 Wolf Prize in Chemistry "for the development of efficient transition-metal catalysts that have revolutionized drug manufacturing, leading to breakthroughs in molecule and synthetics design"; Henry Rapoport Professor of Chemistry at UC Berkeley (2011–present)
- Carl Huffaker – recipient of the Wolf Prize (1994/1995) for " contributions to the development and implementation of environmentally beneficial integrated pest management systems for the protection of agricultural crops"
- **George C. Pimentel** (Ph.D. 1949) – professor at UC Berkeley (1949–1989); inventor of the chemical laser; Wolf Prize (Chemistry, 1982) "for development of matrix isolation spectroscopy and for the discovery of photodissociation lasers and chemical lasers"
- Alexander Pines – recipient of the Wolf Prize (Chemistry, 1991), "for his revolutionary contributions to NMR spectroscopy, especially multiple-quantum and high-spin NMR"
- Stanley B. Prusiner – professor of Virology in Residence (1984–present), Nobel laureate (1997, Physiology or Medicine) "for his discovery of Prions, a new biological principle of infection" (known as the mechanism powering mad cow disease); recipient of the 1996 Wolf Prize in Medicine"for discovering prions, new class of pathogens that cause important neurodegenerative disease by inducing changes in protein structure"
- Peter G. Schultz – professor of chemistry (1985–1999) at UC Berkeley; 1994 Wolf Prize in Chemistry "for converting antibodies into enzymes, thus permitting the catalysis of chemical reactions considered impossible to achieve by classical chemical procedures"
- Stephen Smale – recipient of the Wolf Prize (2007, Mathematics)"for his groundbreaking contributions that have played a fundamental role in shaping differential topology, dynamical systems, mathematical economics, and other subjects in mathematics"
- **Gabor Somorjai** (Ph.D. 1960) – recipient of the 1998 Wolf Prize (Chemistry) for "outstanding contributions to the field of the surface science in general, and for... elucidation of fundamental mechanisms of heterogeneous catalytic reactions at single crystal surfaces in particular"
- Roger Y. Tsien – recipient of the Wolf Prize (Medicine, 2004) "for his seminal contribution to the design and biological application of novel fluorescent and photolabile molecules to analyze and perturb cell signal transduction" (also listed in Nobel laureates)
- Omar M. Yaghi – the James and Neeltje Tretter Professor of Chemistry (2012–present) and senior faculty scientist at Lawrence Berkeley National Laboratory; recipient of the Wolf Prize (Chemistry, 2018) for "pioneering reticular chemistry via metal-organic frameworks (MOFs) and covalent organic frameworks (COFs)"
- **David Zilberman** (Ph.D. 1979) – 2019 Wolf Prize in Agriculture "for developing economic models that address fundamental issues in agriculture, economics and policymaking"; Professor (holder of the Robinson Chair) in the Agricultural and Resource Economics Department at UC Berkeley (1979–present)

=== Breakthrough Prize ===
- Ian Agol – professor of mathematics at UC Berkeley; mathematician of the topology of three-dimensional manifolds; 2016 Breakthrough Prize in Mathematics "for spectacular contributions to low dimensional topology and geometric group theory, including work on the solutions of the tameness, virtual Haken, and virtual fibering conjectures"
- James P. Allison – professor at UC Berkeley (1985–2004); 2014 Breakthrough Prize in Life Sciences "for the discovery of T cell checkpoint blockade as effective cancer therapy"
- Nima Arkani-Hamed, PhD 1997 – theoretical physicist, faculty member of the Institute for Advance Study (Princeton, New Jersey), director of the Center For Future High Energy Physics in Beijing, China; professor (1999–2001) at UC Berkeley; Breakthrough Prize in Fundamental Physics "for original approaches to outstanding problems in particle physics, including the proposal of large extra dimensions, new theories for the Higgs boson, novel realizations of supersymmetry, theories for dark matter, and the exploration of new mathematical structures in gauge theory scattering amplitudes"
- Jean Bourgain – mathematician; visiting scholar (2012–2014) at UC Berkeley; 2017 Breakthrough Prize in Mathematics "for multiple transformative contributions to analysis, combinatorics, partial differential equations, high-dimensional geometry and number theory"
- Jennifer A. Doudna – professor at UC Berkeley; co-inventor of the DNA-editing tool CRISPR;2015 Breakthrough Prize in Life Sciences "for harnessing an ancient mechanism of bacterial immunity into a powerful and general technology for editing genomes, with wide-ranging implications across biology and medicine"
- Kam-Biu Luk – Miller Professor of Physics at UC Berkeley (2001–present); 2016 Breakthrough Prize in Fundamental Physics "for the fundamental discovery and exploration of neutrino oscillations, revealing a new frontier beyond, and possibly far beyond, the Standard Model of particle physics"

=== National Medal of Science ===
- Luis Walter Alvarez – 1963 National Medal of Science "for his inspiring leadership in experimental high energy physics, continuing development of the bubble chamber, discovery of many states of elementary particles, and his contributions to National defense" (also listed in §Nobel laureates)
- **Paul Alivisatos**, Ph.D. 1986 – Samsung Distinguished Professor in Nanoscience and Nanotechnology Research and Professor of Chemistry and Materials Science & Engineering; National Medal of Science "for his foundational contributions to the field of nanoscience; for the development of nanocrystals as a building block of nanotechnologies; and for his leadership in the nanoscience community"
- Bruce Ames – professor of Biochemistry and Molecular Biology at UC Berkeley and director, National Institute of Environmental Health Sciences Center; 1998 National Medal of Science "for changing the direction of basic and applied research on mutation, cancer and aging by devising a simple, inexpensive test for environmental and natural mutagens, by identifying causes and effects of oxidative DNA damage, and by translating these findings into intelligible public policy recommendations on diet and cancer risk for the American people"
- Horace Barker – professor of Biochemistry (1936–1975); 1968 National Medal of Science "for his profound study of the chemical activities of microorganisms, including the unraveling of fatty acid metabolism and the discovery of the active coenzyme form of vitamin B12"
- Melvin Calvin – University Professor of Chemistry (1937–1980); 1989 National Medal of Science "for his pioneering studies in the mechanism of photosynthesis and bioenergetics, and for the application of scientific theory toward the solution of the most fundamental problems of the age-energy, food, chemical and viral carcinogenesis, and the origin of life" (also listed in §Nobel laureates)
- Shiing-Shen Chern – professor of Mathematics at UC Berkeley (1960–1979); founder and inaugural director (1981–1984) of the Mathematical Sciences Research Institute at UC Berkeley; namesake of Chern Hall, the Chern Medal, and the Chern Prize; 1975 National Medal of Science "for developing and extending techniques that led to profound discoveries in geometry and topology" (also listed in §Wolf Prize)
- Alexandre Chorin – professor of mathematics at Berkeley, University Professor at the University of California; 2012 National Medal of Science "for the development of revolutionary methods for realistic fluid-flow simulation, now ubiquitous in the modeling and design of engines, aircraft wings, and heart valves, and in the analysis of natural flows"
- Ray W. Clough – professor of Structural Engineering at UC Berkeley (1949–1987); 1994 National Medal of Science "for his outstanding contributions in the fields of finite element analysis, structural dynamics, and earthquake engineering which had extraordinary influence in the development of modern engineering"
- Marvin L. Cohen – University Professor of Physics; 2001 National Medal of Science "for his creation and application of a quantum theory for explaining and predicting properties of real materials, which formed the basis for semiconductor physics and nanoscience"
- Peter Goldreich – 1990 Miller Professorship at UC Berkeley; 1995 National Medal of Science "for his profound and lasting contributions to planetary sciences and astrophysics, providing fundamental theoretical insights for understanding the rotation of planets, the dynamics of planetary rings, pulsars, astrophysical masers, the spiral arms of galaxies, and the oscillations of the Sun"
- Darleane C. Hoffman – professor UC Berkeley from 1984; 1997 National Medal of Science "for her discovery of primordial plutonium in nature and the symmetric spontaneous fission of heavy nuclei; for pioneering studies of elements 104, 105, and 106, and for her outstanding service to education of students in nuclear chemistry and as director of the Seaborg Institute for Transactinium Science of the University of California"
- Dudley R. Herschbach – member of the Chemical Faculty at UC Berkeley (1959–1963); 1991 National Medal of Science "for his seminal contributions to the fundamental understanding of reactions of atoms and molecules, collision by collision"
- Leonid Hurwicz – visiting professor (1976–1977) at UC Berkeley; 1990 National Medal of Science "for his pioneering work on the theory of modern decentralized allocation mechanisms" (also listed in List of Nobel laureates affiliated with the University of California, Berkeley)
- Harold S. Johnston – professor of chemistry (1957–1991) at UC Berkeley and dean of the College of Chemistry at UC Berkeley (1966–1970); 1997 National Medal of Science "for his major contributions to the chemical sciences in the areas of kinetics and photochemistry, and for his pivotal role in providing understanding and conservation of the Earth's atmospheric environment"
- Richard M. Karp – professor (1968–1994 and 1999–present) of EECS at UC Berkeley; 1996 National Medal of Science "for his pioneering research in theoretical computer science and the development of NP-completeness, a concept having an important role in the theory and the practice of computation"
- Judith P. Klinman – professor (1978–present); 2012 National Medal of Science "for her discoveries of fundamental chemical and physical principles underlying enzyme catalysis and her leadership in the community of scientists"
- Daniel E. Koshland Jr., BA 1941 – professor of biochemistry (1965–2007) at UC Berkeley; 1990 National Medal of Science "for profoundly influencing the understanding of how proteins function through his induced-fit model of enzyme actrion. His incisive analysis of bacterial chemotaxis has led to a deeper understanding of the molecular basis of memory and adaptation"
- **Yuan T. Lee**, Ph.D. 1965 – professor of chemistry at UC Berkeley; 1986 National Medal of Science "for his world leadership in the development of molecular beam techniques and their application to the study of chemical dynamics. His work has had an enormous impact on many areas of physical chemistry, especially building up a quantitative bridge between the laws of mechanics and complex macroscopic phenomena" (also listed in §Nobel laureates)
- Luna Leopold – professor (1972–1986) at UC Berkeley; 1991 National Medal of Science "for his contribution to the hydromechanics of rivers; for influencing the direction and content of physical geography, and for outstanding service to the field of water resources"
- Edwin McMillan – professor of Physics (1945–1974); 1990 National Medal of Science "for his scientific achievements including the identification of the first transuranic element (neptunium) and the invention of the phase stability principle incorporated in the synchrotron" (also listed in §Nobel laureates)
- Jerzy Neyman – professor of Mathematics (1938–1981); 1968 National Medal of Science "for laying the foundations of modern statistics and devising tests and procedure that have become essential parts of the knowledge of every statistician"
- Wolfgang K.H. Panofsky – professor (1946–1951) of physics at UC Berkeley; 1969 National Medal of Science "for classic experiments probing the elementary particles of matter and for contributions to advancing the means of experimentation in this challenging field"
- Kenneth Pitzer, PhD 1937 – lecturer and professor (1935–1964 and 1971–1984) and dean (1951–1960) of the College of Chemistry at UC Berkeley; 1974 National Medal of Science "for his pioneering application of statistical thermodynamics and spectroscopy to our understanding of the properties of organic and inorganic materials"
- **George C. Pimentel**, Ph.D. 1949 – inventor of the chemical laser; director, Laboratory of Chemical Biodynamics at UC Berkeley; 1983 National Medal of Science "for his varied and ingenious use of infrared spectroscopy to study chemical bonding and molecular dynamics, and for his discovery of the first chemically pumped laser, which has had strong scientific impact as well as practical applications" (also listed in §Wolf Prize)
- John Prausnitz – professor of chemical engineering at UC Berkeley 2003; National Medal of Science "for his development of engineering-oriented molecular thermodynamics, which provides a scientific method for the design, construction, and operation of chemical manufacturing plants toward economic efficiency, safety, minimum energy consumption, and environmental protection"
- Stanley B. Prusiner – professor of virology (1984–present) at UC Berkeley; 2009 National Medal of Science "for his discovery of prions, the causative agent of bovine spongiform encephalopathy and other related neurodegenerative diseases, and his continuing efforts to develop effective methods for detecting and treating prion diseases" (also listed in §Nobel laureates)
- **Gabor A. Somorjai**, Ph.D. 1960 – professor of chemistry at UC Berkeley (1964–present); 2001 National Medal of Science "for molecular studies of surfaces through the use of single crystals and the development of new techniques that served as foundations of new surface technologies including heterogeneous catalysis" (also listed in §Wolf Prize)
- Julian Schwinger – researcher (1939–1941); 1964 National Medal of Science for his "profound work on the fundamental problems of quantum field theory, and for many contributions to and lucid expositions of nuclear physics and electrodynamics" (also listed in List of Nobel laureates affiliated with the University of California, Berkeley)
- Glenn T. Seaborg, PhD – professor (1945–1979); 1991 National Medal of Science "for his outstanding work as a chemist, scientist and teacher in the field of nuclear chemistry" (also listed in §Nobel laureates)
- Harry Bolton Seed – professor of Civil Engineering (1950–1989); 1989 National Medal of Science "for his pioneering contributions to the art and science of civil engineering, to the practice of civil engineering at the frontiers of knowledge, to the general understanding of civil engineering methods at all levels, and to the safety and welfare of people throughout the world"
- Herbert A. Simon – 1986 National Medal of Science "for his fundamental contributions to our understanding of human problem-solving behavior and decision making, particularly in organizations"
- Stephen Smale – professor emeritus of Mathematics; 1996 National Medal of Science "for his pioneering contributions to mathematics in the fields of differential topology and dynamical systems, and for applications to physics, biology, economics, and the theory of computation" (also listed in §Wolf Prize)
- G. Ledyard Stebbins – professor (1935–1951); 1979 National Medal of Science "for his outstanding contributions to the synthesis of an evolutionary theory, particularly as it applies to plants"
- Anne Treisman – professor (1986–1994) of psychology at UC Berkeley; 2011 National Medal of Science "for a 50-year career of penetrating originality and depth that has led to the understanding of fundamental attentional limits in the human mind and brain"
- Steven Weinberg – researcher of physics (1959–1966) at UC Berkeley; 1997 National Medal of Science "for his contribution to the identification of cellular oncogenes and their role in cancer, which led to a better understanding of the molecular basis for cancer and its diagnosis and therapy" (also listed in List of Nobel laureates affiliated with the University of California, Berkeley)
- John Roy Whinnery, BS EE 1937 PhD 1948 – lecturer and professor (1946–2007) and dean (1959–1963) of the EECS Department at UC Berkeley; 1992 National Medal of Science "for his research contributions to microwaves, lasers, and quantum electronics; for his excellence as a teacher and author; and for his extensive services to government and professional organizations"

=== National Medal of Technology ===
- Chenming Hu, MS, PhD – professor emeritus of EECS at UC Berkeley; 2014 National Medal of Technology and Innovation "for pioneering innovations in microelectronics including reliability technologies, the first industry-standard model for circuit design, and the first 3-dimensional transistors, which radically advanced semiconductor technology"
- Arthur H. Rosenfeld – professor of physics (1954–2017); 2011 National Medal of Technology and Innovation "for extraordinary leadership in the development of energy-efficient building technologies and related standards and policies"

=== MacArthur Fellowship ===
The MacArthur Fellowship is also known as the "Genius Grant" or "Genius Award".

- Maneesh Agrawala – professor of EECS at UC Berkeley; 2009 MacArthur Fellowship
- Robert Axelrod – professor (1968–1974) of political science at UC Berkeley; 1987 MacArthur Fellowship
- Jillian Banfield – professor (2001–present) in the Department of Biology; 1999 MacArthur Fellowship
- Michael Baxandall – professor (1986–1996) of art history at UC Berkeley; 1988 MacArthur Fellowship
- **Carolyn Bertozzi**, Ph.D. 1993 – professor of chemistry (1996–2015); 1999 MacArthur Fellowship
- **Peter J. Bickel**, Ph.D. 1963 – professor of statistics at UC Berkeley; 1984 MacArthur Fellowship
- Peter Brown – professor (1972–1986) of classics and history at UC Berkeley; 1982 MacArthur Fellowship
- Lu Chen – professor (2003–present) of neuroscience and molecular and cell biology, 2005 MacArthur Fellowship
- Robert F. Coleman – professor of mathematics at UC Berkeley; 1987 MacArthur Fellowship
- Mark Danner – professor of journalism (1998–present); 1999 MacArthur Fellowship
- Michael Dickinson – Williams Professor (1996 – 2002) in the Department of Integrative biology; 2001 MacArthur Fellowship
- David Donoho – professor (1984–1990) of statistics; MacArthur Fellowship 1991
- **Jon H. Else**, B.A. 1968 – Prix Italia recipient (The Day After Trinity), recipient of four Emmy Awards, nominated twice for the Academy Award, 1999 winner of the Sundance Film Festival Filmmaker's Trophy, 1988 MacArthur Fellowship, cinematographer on the Academy Award–winning Who Are the DeBolts? And Where Did They Get Nineteen Kids?, current professor of journalism at UC Berkeley
- Alice Fulton – former lecturer (2004) at UC Berkeley (formally, the Holloway Lecturer in the Practice of Poetry at UC Berkeley); 1991 MacArthur Fellowship
- Thom Gunn – lecturer (1958–1966, 1973–2000) in English; 1993 MacArthur Fellowship
- **Eva Harris**, Ph.D. 1993 – professor in the School of Public Health at the University of California, Berkeley; researcher of dengue fever; 1997 MacArthur Fellowship
- Lin He – current professor of cell and developmental biology at UC Berkeley; 2009 MacArthur Fellowship
- John Holdren – professor emeritus (1996–present) of Energy and Resources at UC Berkeley; director of the federal Office of Science and Technology Policy (OSTP), co-chair of the United States President's Council of Advisors on Science and Technology (PCAST); 1981 MacArthur Fellowship
- **Walter Hood**, M.Arch., M.L.A. 1989 – Berkeley professor, former chair of Landscape Architecture, College of Environmental Design; 2019 MacArthur Fellowship
- John Hopfield – professor (1961–1964) of physics; 1983 MacArthur Fellowship
- Raymond Jeanloz – current professor of earth and planetary science and of astronomy at UC Berkeley; 1988 MacArthur Fellowship
- David Keightley – professor emeritus in the Department of History at UC Berkeley; 1986 MacArthur Fellowship
- Evelyn Fox Keller – professor (1988–1992) of Women's Studies and Rhetoric at UC Berkeley; 1992 MacArthur Fellowship
- Nicole King – professor of integrative biology and of molecular and cell biology (2003–present) at UC Berkeley; 2005 MacArthur Fellowship
- M. A. R. Koehl – professor, Integrative biology; 1990 MacArthur Fellowship
- Claire Kremen – current professor of conservation biology at UC Berkeley (present); MacArthur Fellowship 2007
- Leslie Kurke – professor (1990–present) of literature at UC Berkeley; current Richard and Rhoda Goldman Distinguished Professor at UC Berkeley; 1999 MacArthur Fellowship
- Lawrence W. Levine – American historian, former (1962–1994) professor of history at UC Berkeley; 1983 MacArthur Fellowship
- Polina Lishko – current professor in the Department of Molecular and Cellular Biology; 2020 MacArthur Fellowship
- Michael Manga – current professor in the Department of Earth and Planetary Sciences; 2005 MacArthur Fellowship
- Michael Marletta – Aldo DeBenedictis Distinguished Professor of Chemistry (2001–2011) at UC Berkeley; 1995 MacArthur Fellowship
- Pamela Matson – professor (1993–1997) of ecosystem ecology at UC Berkeley; 1995 MacArthur Fellowship
- Susan McClary – musicologist, former Berkeley lecturer (1993); 1995 MacArthur Fellowship
- Tiya Miles – assistant professor at Berkeley (2000–2002); 2011 MacArthur Fellowship
- **Richard A. Muller**, Ph.D. – professor of Physics at UC Berkeley, senior scientist at Lawrence Berkeley National Laboratory; 1982 MacArthur Fellowship
- Sherry Ortner – former professor (1994–1996) of anthropology; 1990 MacArthur Fellowship
- George Oster – professor of cell and developmental biology at Berkeley; 1985 MacArthur Fellowship
- Norman Pace – member of the faculty (1996–1999); 2001 MacArthur Fellowship
- **Margie Profet**, B.A. physics 1985 – former Berkeley researcher; researcher in evolutionary biology; 1993 MacArthur Fellowship
- Xiao Qiang – adjunct professor at Berkeley's School of Information (2012–present) and its Graduate School of Journalism (2003–2011); 2001 MacArthur Fellowship
- Matthew Rabin – professor of economics; 2000 MacArthur Fellowship
- Ishmael Reed – lecturer (1968–2005) at Berkeley; poet and novelist; 1998 MacArthur Fellowship
- Adam Riess – post-doctoral Miller Fellow at UC Berkeley; Nobel laureate (2011, Physics); 2008 MacArthur Fellowship
- **Julia Hall Bowman Robinson**, B.A. mathematics 1940, Ph.D. 1948 – professor (1976–1985) of mathematics at UC Berkeley, specializing in Hilbert's Tenth Problem; first female president of the American Mathematical Society; namesake of the Julia Robinson Mathematics Festival; 1983 MacArthur Fellowship
- Emmanuel Saez – current Professor of Economics at UC Berkeley; 2010 MacArthur Fellowship
- Pamela Samuelson – current Richard M. Sherman '74 Distinguished Professor of Law and Information Management at UC Berkeley, co-director of the Berkeley Center for Law and Technology; 1997 MacArthur Fellowship
- Richard M. Schoen – former professor of mathematics at UC Berkeley; 1983 MacArthur Fellowship
- Carl Emil Schorske – cultural historian, taught at UC Berkeley (1960–1969); listed among Time magazine's top ten academic leaders; MacArthur Fellowship 1981
- **Allan Sly**, PhD 2009 Statistics – faculty member at the Department of Statistics at UC Berkeley (2011–2016); current professor of mathematics at Princeton University; 2018 MacArthur Fellowship
- **Dawn Song**, Ph.D. 2002 – professor in EECS at UC Berkeley specializing in computer security; 2010 MacArthur Fellowship
- **Claire Tomlin**, Ph.D. 1998 – researcher in unmanned aerial vehicles, air traffic control, and modeling of biological processes; professor in the Department of Aeronautics and Astronautics and the Department of Electrical Engineering, at Stanford University, where she is director of the Hybrid Systems Laboratory; professor in the Department of Electrical Engineering and Computer Science at University of California, Berkeley; 2006 MacArthur Fellow
- Gregory Vlastos – Mills Professor of Philosophy at UC Berkeley (1977–1987); 1990 MacArthur Fellowship
- Loïc Wacquant – current professor of sociology at UC Berkeley; 1997 MacArthur Fellowship
- **Allan Wilson**, Ph.D. 1961 – professor (1972–1991) of Biochemistry at UC Berkeley specializing in molecular approaches to understand biological evolution and to reconstruct phylogenies; 1986 MacArthur Fellowship

=== Enrico Fermi Award ===
- John H. Lawrence – researcher and professor of medical physics(1935–1970); 1983 Enrico Fermi Award "for pioneering work and continuing leadership in nuclear medicine including the first treatment of patients with artificially produced radioactive materials, neutrons, and heavy ion beams, and for his inspiring role in the development of a series of instrumentation techniques for noninvasive radioactive imaging of pathological conditions in man"
- J. Robert Oppenheimer – professor (1929–1947) of physics at UC Berkeley; 1963 Enrico Fermi Award "for contributions to theoretical physics as a teacher and originator of ideas, and for leadership of the Los Alamos Laboratory and the atomic energy program during critical years"
- Wolfgang K. H. Panofsky – professor (1946–1951) of physics at UC Berkeley; 1978 Enrico Fermi Award "for his very important contributions to elementary particle physics, his leading role in advancing accelerator technology his positive influence on younger scientists, and the scientific advice he has given generously to the U.S. Government" (also listed in §National Medal of Science)
- Herbert York – researcher and professor (1943–1954) at UC Berkeley; 2000 Enrico Fermi Award "for his contributions to formulating and implementing arms control policy under four Presidents; for his founding direction of the Lawrence Livermore National Laboratory and his leadership in Research and Engineering at the Department of Defense; and for his publications analyzing and explaining these complex issues with clarity and simplicity"

=== Kellogg National Leadership Award ===
- Galen Cranz – researcher and professor (1975–2018) at UC Berkeley; 1981–1984

=== Environmental Design Research Association Career Award ===
- Galen Cranz – researcher and professor (1975–2018) at UC Berkeley; 2011 award for "her ability to transcend the boundaries of discipline, to cross from meticulous intellectual work to applied research and design, and her passion, integrity, and deep concern for the rightness of all things and places we use embody what is best about EDRA"

== By field ==
=== Agriculture ===
- **Irma Adelman** (B.S. 1950, Ph.D. 1955) – professor of Agricultural and Resource Economics
- Dennis Robert Hoagland – professor of Plant Nutrition

=== Anthropology ===
- Charles L. Briggs – professor of Anthropology and professor of Folklore
- Margaret Conkey – professor of Anthropology
- Clifford Geertz – assistant professor of Anthropology (1958–60)
- Patrick Vinton Kirch – Professor of Anthropology
- Alfred Kroeber – professor of Anthropology and father of Ursula K. Le Guin
- Saba Mahmood – associate professor of Social Cultural Anthropology
- Laura Nader – professor of Anthropology, pioneer of legal anthropology, older sister of Ralph Nader
- Paul Rabinow – professor of Anthropology
- **Vincent Sarich** (M.S., Ph.D.) – professor emeritus of Anthropology
- **Nancy Scheper-Hughes** (B.A. 1970, Ph.D. 1976) – professor of Anthropology
- Ruth Tringham – professor of Anthropology

=== Art and architecture ===
- Christopher Alexander – professor emeritus of Architecture
- Svetlana Alpers – professor emeritus of Art History
- T.J. Clark – professor of Art History
- Galen Cranz – professor emeritus of Architecture (1975–2018)
- Karl Kasten (B.A. 1938, M.A. 1939) – professor emeritus, Art Practice
- Spiro Kostof – professor of Architecture (1965–1991)
- Lois Wilson Langhorst – architecture faculty
- Roslyn Lindheim – professor of Architecture (1963–1987)
- Bernard Maybeck – drawing instructor (1894), professor of Architecture (1898–1903)
- John McNamara – lecturer, Art Practice
- George Miyasaki – professor of Art Practice
- Roger Montgomery – dean, College of Environmental Design, professor of Urban Design, Architecture, and City and Regional Planning (1967–1996)
- Raymond Puccinelli – professor of Sculpture in the 1940s
- Jane Rosen – lecturer, Art Practice (1996–2005)
- Sim Van der Ryn – professor emeritus of Architecture

=== Astronomy ===
- Alex Filippenko – professor of Astronomy
- Carl E. Heiles – professor of Astronomy
- Raymond Jeanloz – professor of Astronomy, professor of Earth and Planetary Science
- Paul Kalas – assistant adjunct professor of Astronomy
- Ivan R. King – professor of Astronomy, chair of the Astronomy Department (1967–1970), professor emeritus (1993)
- **James Kirchner** (Ph.D. 1990) – professor of Earth and Planetary Science
- Richard Klein – adjunct professor of Astronomy
- Michael Manga – professor of Earth and Planetary Science
- Geoffrey Marcy – professor of Astronomy, discoverer of many extrasolar planets, winner of the Shaw Prize in astronomy in 2005
- **Paul Renne** (B.A. 1982, Ph.D 1987) – director of the Berkeley Geochronology Center and adjunct professor of Earth and Planetary Science
- Adam Riess – Miller Fellow, professor of Physics, winner of the Shaw Prize in Astronomy in 2006
- **Frank Shu** (Ph.D. 1986) – professor of Astronomy, winner of the Shaw Prize in Astronomy in 2009

=== Biology ===
- Bruce Ames – professor of Biochemistry and Molecular Biology
- Clinton Ballou – professor of Biochemistry and Molecular Biology
- George W. Barlow – professor emeritus of Integrated Biology
- **Carlos Bustamante** (Ph.D. 1981) – professor of Physics, Molecular and Cellular Biology, and Chemistry
- John E. Casida – professor of Toxicology and Entomology
- **George W. Chang** (Ph.D 1967) – associate professor emeritus of Nutritional Sciences and Toxicology
- Ignacio Chapela – professor of Microbial Ecology
- **William A. Clemens** (B.A. 1954, Ph.D 1960) – professor emeritus of Integrative Biology
- Kenneth S. Cole – Regents Professor, father of biophysics, invented the voltage clamp procedure
- Richard Dawkins – visiting assistant professor of Zoology (Animal Behavior), 1970, co-taught course with George S. Barlow
- Terrence Deacon – professor of Biological Anthropology and Linguistics
- **Marian Diamond** (Ph.D. 1953) – professor of Anatomy
- Peter Duesberg – professor of Biochemistry and Molecular Biology
- **Richard M. Eakin** (B.A. 1931, Ph.D. 1935) – professor of Zoology
- Michael Eisen – associate professor of Genetics, Genomics and Development, and Howard Hughes Investigator
- Lewis Feldman – professor of Plant Biology
- Mary K. Firestone – professor of Environmental Science, Policy, and Management and Plant and Microbial Ecology
- Heinz Fraenkel-Conrat – professor of Molecular Biology
- Walter J. Freeman – professor emeritus of Neurobiology
- Karine A. Gibbs – microbiologist and immunologist, associate professor
- **Eva Harris** (Ph.D. 1993) – professor of Infectious Disease
- **Tyrone Hayes** (Ph.D. 1993) – professor of Integrative Biology
- Nicole King – assistant professor of Genetics, Genomics and Development, and MacArthur Fellow (2005)
- Charles Atwood Kofoid – professor and chairman of Zoology
- David R. Lindberg – professor of Integrative Biology
- Jere H. Lipps – professor of Integrative Biology
- Anastasios Melis – professor of Enzymology
- Barbara J. Meyer – professor of Genetics, Genomics and Development and Howard Hughes Investigator
- Eva Nogales – professor of Biochemistry and Molecular Biology and Howard Hughes Investigator
- Kevin Padian – professor of Integrative Biology and president of the National Center for Science Education
- Kristen Kroll – professor of Developmental Biology
- James L. Patton – professor emeritus of Integrative Biology
- Jasper Rine – professor of Genetics, Genomics and Development
- Gerald M. Rubin – professor of Genetics, Genomics and Development, Howard Hughes Investigator, and director of HHMI's Janelia Farm Research Campus
- Howard Schachman – professor of Biochemistry and Molecular Biology
- Randy Schekman – professor of Cell and Development Biology and Howard Hughes Investigator
- Wayne Sousa – professor of Integrative Biology
- Robert C. Stebbins – professor emeritus of Integrative Biology
- **Robert Tjian** (B.A. 1971) – professor of Biochemistry and Molecular Biology, president of HHMI (beginning 2009)
- Roger Tsien – professor of Physiology-Anatomy, Nobel Laureate in Chemistry
- James W. Valentine – professor emeritus of Integrative Biology
- David B. Wake – professor emeritus of Integrative Biology
- Marvalee Wake – professor emeritus of Integrative Biology
- Tim White – professor of Integrative Biology
- **Allan Wilson** (Ph.D. 1961) – professor of Biochemistry
- Charles W. Woodworth – founder of the UCB Division of Entomology; PBESA gives the C. W. Woodworth Award

=== Business ===
- Tom Campbell – professor of Business Administration at the UC Berkeley's Haas School of Business, dean of the UC Berkeley's Haas (2002–2008); member of the U.S. House of Representatives (1993–2001)
- **Henry Chesbrough** (Ph.D. 1997) – adjunct professor of Business Administration at the UC Berkeley's Haas School of Business
- **Richard Lyons** (B.S. 1982) – professor of Business Administration at the UC Berkeley's Haas School of Business, dean of the UC Berkeley's Haas (2008–2018)
- David C. Mowery – professor of Business Administration
- Victor Niederhoffer (1943– 2026) – assistant professor of Finance; hedge fund manager, U.S. Squash Champion and Paddleball Champion, bestselling author, and statistician.
- **Carl Shapiro** (M.A. 1977) – professor of Business Administration at the UC Berkeley's Haas School of Business
- David Teece – professor of Business Administration at the UC Berkeley's Haas School of Business
- Philip E. Tetlock – professor of Organizational Behavior at the UC Berkeley's Haas School of Business
- **Paul Tiffany** (Ph.D. 1983) – senior lecturer at the UC Berkeley's Haas School of Business
- Laura D'Andrea Tyson – Distinguished Professor of the Graduate School at the UC Berkeley's Haas School of Business, dean of the UC Berkeley's Haas (1998–2001); 2nd director of the National Economic Council, 16th chair of the President's Council of Economic Advisers
- **Hal Varian** (M.A., Ph.D. 1973) – professor emeritus at the UC Berkeley's Haas School of Business; chief economist of Google
- David Vogel – professor of Business Administration and Professor of Political Science at the UC Berkeley's Haas School of Business
- Oliver E. Williamson – professor emeritus of Business and Professor of Economics and Law at the UC Berkeley's Haas School of Business
- Catherine Wolfram – Cora Jane Flood Professor of Business Administration and associate dean for Academic Affairs at the UC Berkeley's Haas School of Business
- Janet Yellen – professor emeritus of Business Administration at the UC Berkeley's Haas School of Business; 78th U.S. Secretary of the Treasury, 15th Chair of the Federal Reserve, 18th chair of the President's Council of Economic Advisors

=== Chemistry ===
- **Carolyn Bertozzi** (Ph.D. 1993) – professor of Chemistry and Professor of Molecular and Cell Biology, MacArthur Fellow (1999), Howard Hughes Investigator and member of the National Academy of Sciences
- Leo Brewer – professor of Chemistry; member of the NAS; father of high temperature chemistry and former associate director of Berkeley National Lab
- David Chandler – professor of Chemistry
- **Robert E. Connick** (Ph.D. 1942) – professor of chemistry, dean of college of chemistry, vice chancellor
- Graham R. Fleming – Melvin Calvin Distinguished Professor of Chemistry (1997–present)
- Jean Fréchet – professor of Chemistry and Chemical Engineering and current Henry Rapoport Chair of Organic Chemistry
- Phillip Geissler – Aldo De Benedictis Distinguished Professor of Chemistry
- Martin Head-Gordon – professor of Chemistry
- Clayton Heathcock – professor of Chemistry
- Joel Henry Hildebrand – professor of Chemistry
- Darleane C. Hoffman – professor of Chemistry
- Harold S. Johnston – professor of Chemistry, National Medal of Science laureate
- Jay Keasling – professor of Chemical Engineering and Bioengineering
- Sung-Hou Kim – professor of Chemistry
- John Kuriyan – professor of Chemistry and Professor of Biochemistry and Molecular Biology
- G.N. Lewis – dean of the College of Chemistry, professor of physical chemistry
- William H. Miller – professor of Chemistry
- Roya Maboudian – professor of Chemical Engineering
- Alexander Pines – professor of Chemistry
- **Kenneth Pitzer** (Ph.D. 1937) – dean of the College of Chemistry (1951–60), professor of Chemistry, president of Rice University and Stanford University
- Eran Rabani – professor of Chemistry
- Kenneth Raymond – professor of Chemistry
- Richard J. Saykally – professor of Chemistry
- **Gabor A. Somorjai** (Ph.D. 1960) – professor of Chemistry
- Ignacio Tinoco, Jr. – professor of Chemistry

=== Civil engineering ===
- Frank Baron – professor of Civil Engineering
- William Garrison – professor emeritus of Civil and Environmental Engineering
- **T. Y. Lin** (M.S. 1933) – professor of Civil Engineering; bridgebuilder
- **William J. Oswald** (B.E. 1950, M.S. 1951, Ph.D. 1957) – professor of Civil and Environmental Engineering

=== Computer science ===
- Brian A. Barsky – professor of Computer Science and affiliate professor of Optometry and Vision Science
- **Eric Brewer** (B.S. 1989) – professor of Computer Science
- Michael Buckland – professor emeritus at the School of Information
- John Canny – professor of Computer Science
- **David Culler** (B.A. 1980) – professor of Computer Science
- Richard Fateman – professor emeritus of Computer Science
- Susan L. Graham – professor of Computer Science
- **Joseph M. Hellerstein** (M.S. 1992) – professor of Computer Science
- Michael I. Jordan – professor of Computer Science, highly publicized academic in artificial intelligence
- **Randy Katz** (M.S. 1978, Ph.D. 1980) – professor of Computer Science
- **Butler Lampson** (Ph.D. 1967) – professor of Computer Science and a founding member of the Xerox Palo Alto Research Center
- **Peter Norvig** (Ph.D. 1985) – former research faculty member, co-author of Artificial Intelligence: A Modern Approach
- Geoffrey Nunberg – professor, School of Information
- James F. O'Brien – professor of Computer Science
- John K. Ousterhout – professor of Computer Science and creator of the Tcl programming language and the Tk platform-independent widget toolkit
- Christos Papadimitriou – professor of Computer Science
- David A. Patterson – professor of Computer Science, pioneer of RISC computer design and RAID storage systems
- **Vern Paxson** (M.S., Ph.D. 1997) – associate professor of Computer Science
- Satish Rao – professor of Computer Science and ACM Fellow
- Stuart J. Russell – professor of Computer Science, co-author of Artificial Intelligence: A Modern Approach
- Carlo H. Sequin – professor of Computer Science
- Scott Shenker – professor of Computer Science
- Jonathan Shewchuk – associate professor of Computer Science
- Alan Jay Smith – professor of Computer Science
- Luca Trevisan – associate professor of Computer Science
- **Claire J. Tomlin** (Ph.D. 1998) – associate professor of Electrical Engineering and Computer Science, and MacArthur Fellow (2006)
- **Umesh Vazirani** (Ph.D. 1986) – professor of Computer Science
- **David Wagner** (M.S. 1999, Ph.D. 2000) – professor of Computer Science; known for research in cryptography and security generally, including electronic voting
- Lotfi A. Zadeh – professor of Computer Science; "father of fuzzy logic 1965"; IEEE Pioneer Award in Fuzzy Systems 2000; IEEE Medal of Honor 1995

=== Economics ===
- David Card – professor of Economics, John Bates Clark Medal winner (1995)
- J. Bradford DeLong – professor of Economics
- Barry Eichengreen – professor of Economics and Political Science
- **Clark Kerr** (Ph.D. 1939) – professor of Industrial Relations, chancellor (1952–58), UC president (1958–67)
- Maurice Obstfeld – professor of Economics
- **Martha Olney** (M.A. 1980, Ph.D. 1985) – adjunct professor of Economics
- Andreas Papandreou – professor and chair of Economics; Prime Minister of Greece
- Matthew Rabin – professor of Economics, MacArthur Fellow (2000) and John Bates Clark Medal winner (2001)
- Gordon Rausser – professor of Agricultural and Resource Economics
- James C. Robinson – Kaiser Permanente Distinguished Professor of Health Economics
- Gérard Roland – professor of Economics
- Christina Romer – professor of Economics; 25th chair of the President's Council of Economic Advisors
- David Romer – professor of Political Economy
- Mark Rubinstein – Paul Stephens Professor of Applied Investment Analysis, co-developer of the binomial tree method of options valuation
- **Harry R. Wellman** (M.S. 1924, Ph.D. 1926) – professor of Agricultural Economics, UC vice president (1958–67), acting UC president (1967)

=== Education ===
- Andrea diSessa – professor of Education
- **Arthur Jensen** (B.A. 1945) – professor emeritus of Educational Psychology
- Jean Lave – professor emerita of Education and Geography
- Elliot Turiel – professor of Education

=== Electrical engineering ===
- Leon O. Chua – professor of Electrical Engineering, "father of nonlinear circuit theory", inventor of Chua's circuit, and first to postulate the existence of the solid state memristor
- Clarence Cory – first professor of Mechanical and Electrical Engineering at UC Berkeley
- David Messerschmitt – professor emeritus of Electrical Engineering
- Richard S. Muller – professor emeritus of Electrical Engineering
- Andrew R. Neureuther – Rockwell Distinguished Professor of Electrical Engineering
- Donald Pederson – professor of Electrical Engineering, creator of SPICE, the canonical integrated circuit simulator
- **Kristofer Pister** (M.S. 1989, Ph.D. 1992) – professor of Electrical Engineering
- Alberto Sangiovanni-Vincentelli – professor of Electrical Engineering, Clerk Maxwell Award '09
- **Shankar S. Sastry** (M.S. 1979, M.A. 1980, Ph.D. 1981) – professor of Electrical Engineering, Bioengineering, and Mechanical Engineering and dean of the College of Engineering
- Otto J. M. Smith – professor of Electrical Engineering, inventor of the Smith predictor
- Eli Yablonovitch – professor of Electrical Engineering

=== Ethnic studies ===
- **Vévé Amasasa Clark** (Ph.D. 1983) – professor of African American Studies
- **Evelyn Nakano Glenn** (B.A. 1962) – professor of Ethnic Studies, and professor of Gender and Women's Studies
- Michael Omi – associate professor of Ethnic Studies
- **Ronald Takaki** (Ph.D. 1967) – professor emeritus of Ethnic Studies
- **Young Shin** – lecturer

=== Film studies ===
- Kaja Silverman (1940) – professor of Film Studies and Rhetoric
- **Brett Simon** (Ph.D. 2003) – professor of Film Studies
- **Linda Williams** (B.A. 1969) – professor of Film Studies

=== Foreign languages and culture ===
- Giorgio Agamben – visiting chair of Italian Culture, Department of Italian Studies (1994)
- Robert Alter – professor of Hebrew and Comparative Literature
- Daniel Boyarin – professor of Near Eastern Studies and Rhetoric
- Vasudha Dalmia – emerita professor of Hindi and Modern South Asian Studies; Catherine and William L. Magistretti Distinguished Professorship in South and Southeast Asian Studies, 2001–2012
- Michel Foucault – visiting professor of French (early 1980s)
- George L. Hart – professor of Tamil Studies
- John Lindow – professor of Scandinavian
- Yakov Malkiel – professor of Spanish and professor of Linguistics, 1943–1983; founded journal Romance Philology
- James T. Monroe – professor emeritus of Near Eastern Studies
- **Johanna Nichols** (Ph.D 1973) – professor of Slavic Languages and Literatures
- William Popper – professor of Semitic languages
- David Stronach – professor of Near Eastern Studies
- Alan Tansman – professor of Japanese studies
- Erico Verissimo – professor of Brazilian Literature (1943–1945)
- **Frederic Wakeman, Jr.** (Ph.D. 1965) – Haas Professor of Asian Studies, professor of History, president emeritus of the American Historical Association
- Viktor Zhivov – professor of Slavic Languages and Literatures, 1995–2013

=== Geography ===
- Michael J. Watts – professor of Geography and Development Studies

=== Geology ===
- Walter Alvarez – professor of Geology
- **Garniss Curtis** (Ph.D. 1951) – professor emeritus of Geology

=== History ===
- Herbert Bolton – Sather Professor and chair of History; first director of Bancroft Library
- David Brading – assistant professor of History (1965–1971)
- Beshara Doumani – associate professor of History
- Erich S. Gruen – Gladys Rehard Wood Professor of History and Classics
- **David Hollinger** (M.A. 1965, Ph.D. 1970) – professor of American History
- Martin Jay – Sidney Hellman Ehrman Professor of History
- Adrienne Koch – professor of History
- Thomas W. Laqueur – Helen Fawcett Professor of History
- Joseph R. Levenson – Jane K. Sather Professor of History
- **Leon F. Litwack** (B.A. 1951, Ph.D. 1958) – Pulitzer Prize (Been in the Storm So Long [1980]), Morrison Professor of American History
- Nicholas V. Riasanovsky – professor emeritus of History
- Raphael Sealey – professor of History (1967–2000, emeritus to 2013)
- Yuri Slezkine – professor of History
- Kenneth M. Stampp – Morrison Professor (to 1983)
- **Derek Van Rheenen** (B.A. 1986, M.A. 1993, Ph.D. 1997) – director of the Athletic Study Center; has taught courses in American Studies and the School of Education
- Frederic Wakeman – professor of History
- Dixon Wecter – Margaret Byrne Professor of United States History (1949–1950)

=== Industrial engineering and operations research ===
- Stuart Dreyfus – professor emeritus of Industrial Engineering and Operations Research
- **Ashok Gadgil** (M.A. 1975, Ph.D. 1979) – adjunct professor, Energy and Resources Group
- Ken Goldberg – professor of Industrial Engineering and Operations Research

=== Law ===
- **Robert Berring** (J.D., M.L.S. 1974) – professor of Law
- Robert Cooter – professor of Law
- **Maria Echaveste** (J.D. 1980) – lecturer in residence, School of Law, and former deputy chief of staff to President Bill Clinton
- Christopher Edley, Jr. – dean, School of Law
- Aaron Edlin – professor of Economics, professor of Law
- Bernard L. Diamond – professor of Law and Psychiatry
- Daniel A. Farber – professor of Law and director, Environmental Law Program
- Claire Finkelstein – professor at the University of Pennsylvania Law School
- William A. Fletcher – Professor emeritus of Law and judge on the U.S. Court of Appeals for the Ninth Circuit
- Angela P. Harris – professor of Law
- Chris Hoofnagle – lecturer in Residence, privacy and computer crime expert
- Phillip E. Johnson – professor emeritus of Law, considered the father of the intelligent design movement
- Hans Kelsen – professor of Law, one of the preeminent jurists of the 20th century
- Christopher Lee Kutz – C. William Maxeiner Distinguished Professor of Law
- John T. Noonan, Jr. – professor emeritus of Law and senior judge on the U.S. Court of Appeals for the Ninth Circuit
- Pamela Samuelson – professor of Law, professor of Information Management and director, Berkeley Center for Law and Technology
- Paul M. Schwartz – information privacy law expert
- Philip Selznick – professor emeritus of Law and Sociology
- **Jonathan Simon** (B.A. 1981, J.D. 1987, Ph.D. 1990) – professor of Law and associate dean, Jurisprudence and Social Policy Program, School of Law
- Jerome Herbert Skolnick – professor emeritus of Law
- Eleanor Swift – professor of Law
- **Roger J. Traynor** – professor of Law, acting dean of UC Berkeley School of Law, 23rd chief justice of California (1964–1970)
- John Yoo – professor of Law, contributor to the PATRIOT Act

=== Linguistics ===
- Larry Hyman – professor of Linguistics
- Sharon Inkelas – professor of Linguistics
- Paul Kay – professor emeritus of Linguistics
- George Lakoff – professor of Linguistics and Cognitive Science
- Robin Lakoff – professor of Linguistics
- **James Matisoff** (Ph.D 1967) – professor emeritus of Linguistics, expert in the Tibeto-Burman languages
- Maria Mavroudi – professor of History
- John Ohala – professor emeritus of Linguistics
- **Eve Sweetser** (Ph.D. 1984) – professor of Linguistics

=== Literature and rhetoric ===
- Yehuda Amichai – visiting professor
- Lowell Bergman – Reva and David Logan Distinguished Professor of Journalism
- Judith Butler – Maxine Elliot Professor of Rhetoric and Comparative Literature
- Frederick Crews – professor emeritus of English
- Stanley Fish – professor of English (1962–1974)
- Thomas Flanagan – professor of English; author of The Year of the French; winner of 1979 National Critics Circle Award for fiction
- **Catherine Gallagher** (B.A. 1972, M.A. 1975, Ph.D. 1979) – Eggers Professor of English
- Stephen Greenblatt – professor of English (1969–1997)
- Thom Gunn – senior lecturer, MacArthur Fellow (1993)
- Robert Hass – U.S. Poet Laureate, National Book Award winner, professor of English
- Evelyn Fox Keller – professor of Rhetoric, History, and Women's Studies (1988–1992)
- **Maxine Hong Kingston** (B.A. 1962) – author (Woman Warrior), senior lecturer
- Ron Loewinsohn – professor emeritus of English
- A. A. Long – professor of Classics and professor of Literature
- Walter Benn Michaels – professor of English (1977–1987)
- D. A. Miller – John F. Hotchkis Professor of English
- N. Scott Momaday – professor of English, 1969 Pulitzer Prize
- Bharati Mukherjee – professor of English
- Geoffrey G. O'Brien – assistant professor of English
- Michael Pollan – Knight Professor of Journalism
- Rebecca N. Porter – instructor in short story and novel writing
- Josiah Royce – professor of Composition and Literature
- Peter Dale Scott – professor emeritus of English

=== Mathematics ===
UC Berkeley Department of Mathematics

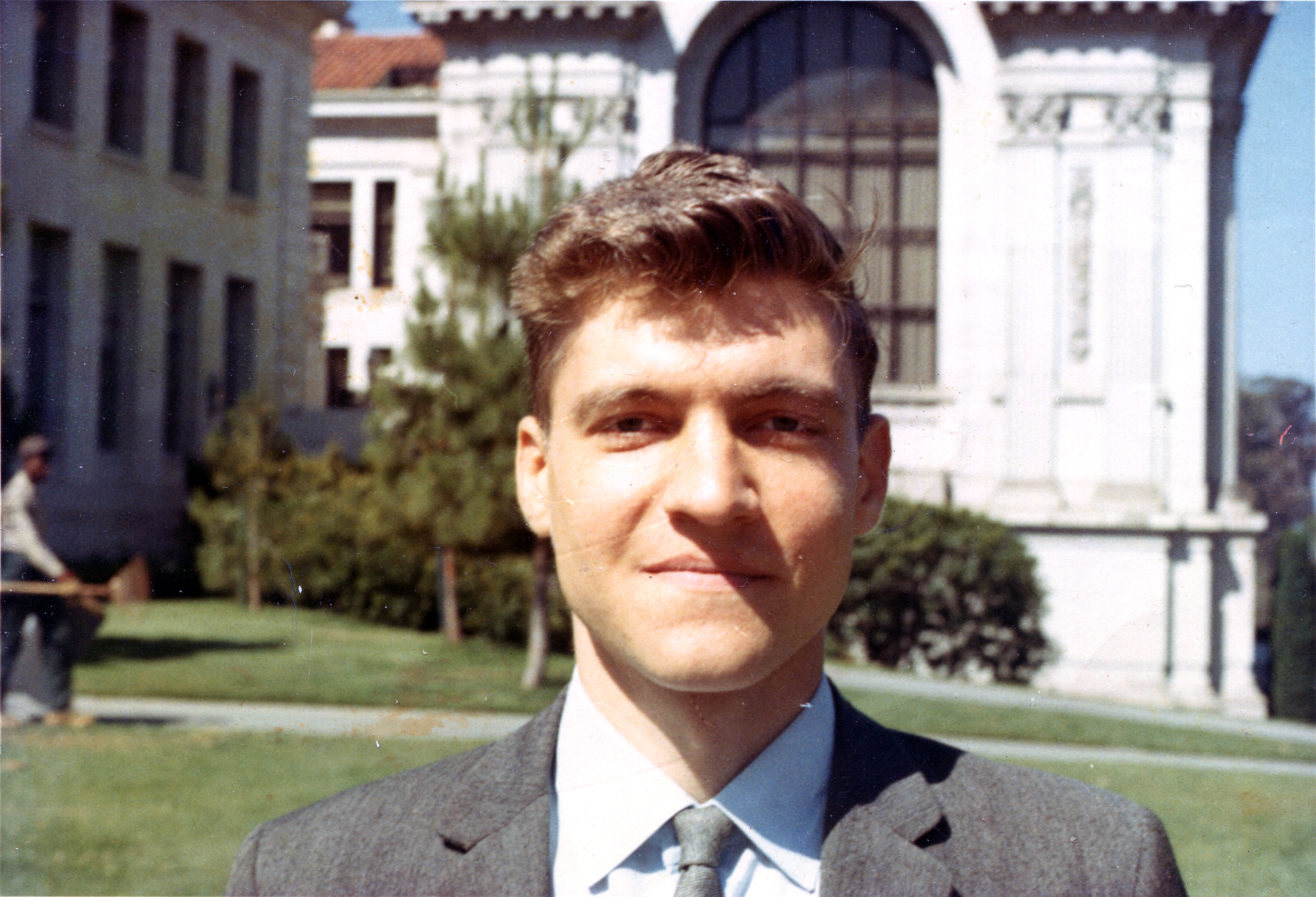
Prof. Ted Kaczynski, youngest professor, domestic terrorist

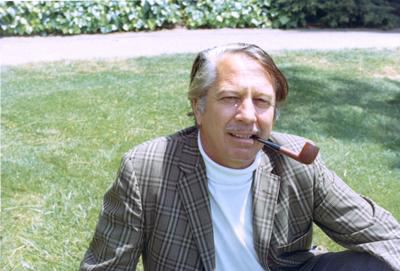
Chairman John L. Kelley

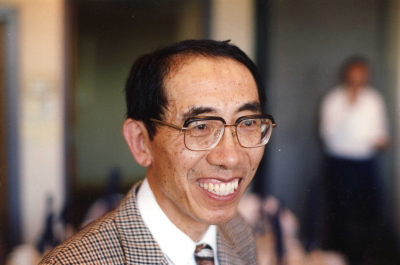
Chairman Shoshichi Kobayashi

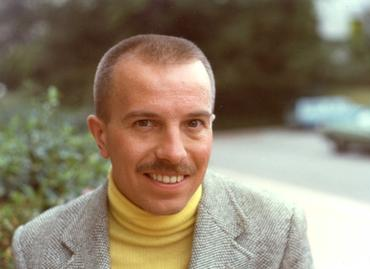
Chair Calvin C. Moore

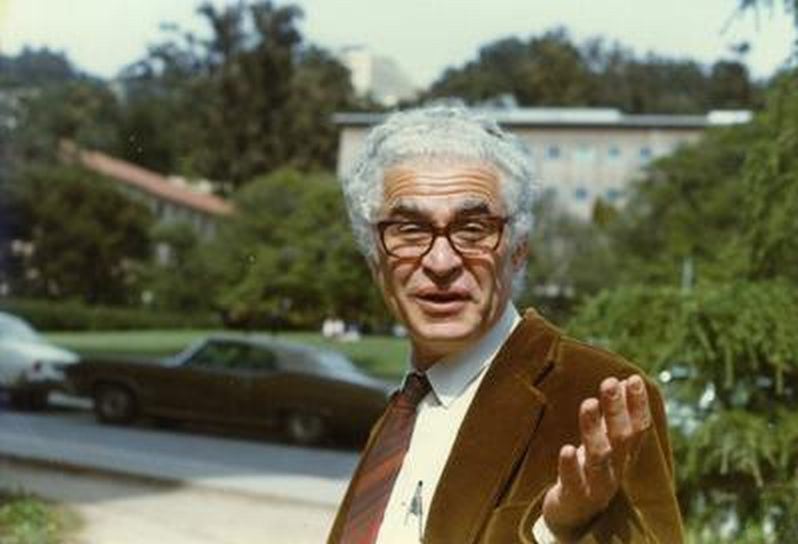
Chairman Maxwell Rosenlicht

- David Aldous – professor of Mathematics
- William Arveson – professor emeritus of Mathematics
- Grigory Barenblatt – professor of Mathematics
- Elwyn Berlekamp – professor of Mathematics
- David Blackwell – professor emeritus of Statistics
- Shiing-Shen Chern – leading differential geometer, professor of Mathematics
- Alexandre Chorin – professor of Mathematics
- William Craig – professor of Philosophy (Mathematical Logic)
- David Eisenbud – professor of Mathematics and former director of the Mathematical Sciences Research Institute
- Lawrence C. Evans – professor of Mathematics
- Andreas Floer – professor of Mathematics (1988–1990), developed Floer homology
- David Freedman – professor of Statistics
- Edward Frenkel – professor of Mathematics
- Alexander Givental – professor of Mathematics
- Phillip Griffiths – mathematician, winner of the Wolf Prize in Mathematics in 2008
- Mark Haiman – professor of Mathematics
- Leo Harrington – professor of Mathematics
- Jenny Harrison – professor of Mathematics
- Robin Hartshorne – professor emeritus of Mathematics
- Leon Henkin – professor of Mathematics, department chairman 1966–1968, 1984–1985
- Olga Holtz – professor of Mathematics
- Theodore Kaczynski – assistant professor of Mathematics, youngest professor in the Department of Mathematics; later a domestic terrorist known as the Unabomber
- John L. Kelley – professor of Mathematics, department chairman 1957–1960, 1975–1978
- Robion Kirby – professor of Mathematics
- Shoshichi Kobayashi – professor emeritus of Mathematics, department chairman 1978–1981
- Hendrik Lenstra – professor emeritus of Mathematics
- Michel Loève – professor of Mathematics and Statistics
- Calvin C. Moore – professor emeritus of Mathematics, department chair 1996–2002, author of Mathematics at Berkeley: A History
- Charles B. Morrey, Jr. – professor of Mathematics, department chairman 1949–1954
- Jerzy Neyman – professor of Mathematics
- Marina Ratner – professor of Mathematics
- Nicolai Reshetikhin – professor of Mathematics
- Ken Ribet – professor of Mathematics, contributor to the proof of Fermat's Last Theorem
- Maxwell Rosenlicht – professor of Mathematics, department chairman 1973–1975
- Rainer K. Sachs – professor emeritus of Mathematics
- **James Sethian** (Ph.D. 1982) – professor of Mathematics
- **Jack Silver** (Ph.D. 1966) – professor of Mathematics
- Theodore Slaman – professor of Mathematics
- **John R. Steel** (Ph.D. 1977) – professor of Mathematics, set theorist
- Bernd Sturmfels – professor of Mathematics, Statistics and Computer Science
- Alfred Tarski – professor of Mathematics and Philosophy
- Dan-Virgil Voiculescu – professor of Mathematics
- Paul Vojta – professor of Mathematics
- Katrin Wehrheim – associate professor of mathematics
- **Alan Weinstein** (Ph.D. 1967) – professor of Mathematics
- **W. Hugh Woodin** – professor of Mathematics, set theorist

=== Mechanical engineering ===
- Hans Albert Einstein – professor of Hydraulic Engineering (1947–1970); son of Albert Einstein
- Carlos Fernandez-Pello – professor of Mechanical Engineering and research scientist in combustion
- Cornel Stan - Russell Severance Springer Professor of Mechanical Engineering (2005-2006)
- Chang-Lin Tien – university professor (UC system), NEC Distinguished Professor of Engineering, chancellor of Berkeley campus (1990–1997)
- Blake R. Van Leer – professor of Mechanical Engineering

=== Music ===
- Ronald Barnes – player of the university's carillon in Sather Tower
- David Dodge Boyden – professor emeritus of Musicology
- Cindy Cox – professor of Composition
- Arnold Elston – professor of Music 1958–71
- Joseph Kerman – professor emeritus of Music
- Myra Melford – professor of Composition and Improvisation
- **Davitt Moroney** (Ph.D. 1980) – professor of Music
- Anthony Newcomb – professor emeritus of Music
- Verna Osborne – voice faculty at San Francisco extension campus
- Mary Ann Smart – professor of Music
- Richard Taruskin – professor of Music
- Ken Ueno – professor of Composition
- Kate van Orden – professor of Music 1997−2013
- Olly Wilson – professor emeritus of Music

=== Nuclear engineering ===
- Donald R. Olander – professor of Nuclear Engineering and James Fife Chair in Engineering

=== Philosophy ===
- Janet Broughton – professor of Philosophy and vice provost for the Faculty
- William Craig – professor emeritus of Philosophy
- Donald Davidson – philosopher, Willis S. and Marion Slusser Professor of Philosophy
- Hubert Dreyfus – professor of Philosophy
- Paul Feyerabend – professor of Philosophy
- Thomas Kuhn – professor of the Philosophy and History of Science (1956–1964)
- John Searle – professor of Philosophy
- Hans Sluga – professor of Philosophy
- Barry Stroud – professor of Philosophy
- Alfred Tarski – professor of Mathematics and Philosophy
- R. Jay Wallace – professor of Philosophy
- Bernard Williams – professor of Philosophy
- Richard Wollheim – professor of Philosophy

=== Physics ===
- Hugh Bradner – professor of Physics, inventor of the neoprene wetsuit
- William Chinowsky – professor of Astrophysics, Guggenheim Fellow
- John Clarke – professor of Physics
- Robert C. Dynes – professor of Physics and former president of the University of California system
- Gerson Goldhaber – professor emeritus of Physics
- Frances Hellman – professor of Physics
- John J. Hopfield – professor of Physics, known for the Hopfield Network, an artificial neural network developed in 1982
- J. D. Jackson – professor emeritus of Physics
- Charles Kittel – professor emeritus of Physics
- Ernest Lawrence – professor emeritus of Physics, inventor of cyclotron
- Stanley Mandelstam – professor emeritus of Physics
- Daniel McKinsey – Georgia Lee Distinguished Professor of Physics
- Richard A. Muller – professor of Physics, MacArthur Fellow (1982)
- Robert Oppenheimer – professor of Physics, scientific head of the Manhattan Project, "father of the atomic bomb"
- P. Buford Price – professor of Physics
- Julian Schwinger – theoretical physicist, National Research fellow
- Edward Teller – professor of Physics, "father of the hydrogen bomb"
- Ahmet Yildiz – assistant professor of Physics and assistant professor of Biochemistry and Molecular Biology
- **Alex Zettl** (B.A. 1978) – professor of Physics
- Bruno Zumino – professor of Physics

=== Political science ===
- Vinod K. Aggarwal – professor of Political Science and director of Berkeley APEC Study Center
- Mark Bevir – professor of Political Science
- Walden Bello – founder of Focus on the Global South, member of the Philippine House of Representatives, named Outstanding Public Scholar for 2008 by the International Studies Association
- Wendy Brown – professor of Political Science
- Bruce E. Cain – professor of Political Science
- David Collier – professor of Political Science
- Richard Feachem – professor of Global Health
- Peter D. Hart – visiting lecturer of Political Science
- Ira Michael Heyman – professor emeritus of City and Regional Planning, and professor emeritus of Law
- Allan Jacobs – professor emeritus of City and Regional Planning and Urban Design
- **Chalmers Johnson** – professor of Political Science and chair of Center for Chinese Studies (1967–1973)
- Ken Jowitt – professor emeritus of Political Science, Robson Professor of Political Science
- Daniel Kammen – professor of Public Policy, professor of Nuclear Engineering, professor of Energy
- David L. Kirp – professor of Public Policy
- Leslie Lipson – professor of Political Science
- Trinh T. Minh-ha – professor of Rhetoric and professor of Gender and Women's Studies
- Janet Napolitano – professor of Public Policy, president of the University of California (2013–2020); 3rd U.S. Secretary of Homeland Security, 21st governor of Arizona
- T.J. Pempel – professor of Political Science
- Robert Reich – professor of Public Policy; 22nd U.S. Secretary of Labor
- **AnnaLee Saxenian** (M.C.P. 1980) – professor, School of Information, and professor of City and Regional Planning
- Kenneth Waltz – professor emeritus of Political Science, and one of the founders of neorealism, or structural realism
- Steven Weber – professor of Political Science
- John Zysman – professor of Political Science

=== Psychology ===
- Serena Chen – professor of Psychology
- Anne E. Cunningham – distinguished professor of Psychology
- Erik Erikson – professor of Psychology (1942–1950)
- Susan Ervin-Tripp – professor emeritus of Psychology
- Alison Gopnik – professor of Psychology
- Dacher Keltner – professor of Psychology
- Eleanor Rosch – professor of Psychology
- Dan Slobin – professor emeritus of Psychology
- Fei Xu – professor of Psychology

=== Public health ===
- Cheri Pies – professor of Public Health
- Malcolm Potts – professor of Public Health

=== Sociology ===
- Robert Bellah – professor emeritus of Sociology, author of Habits of the Heart and The Good Society, recipient of the National Humanities Medal
- Reinhard Bendix – professor of Sociology (1947–1991)
- Michael Burawoy – professor of Sociology
- Manuel Castells – professor of Sociology and City and Regional Planning
- Harry Edwards – professor emeritus of Sociology
- Claude S. Fischer – professor of Sociology
- Erving Goffman – professor of Sociology (1958–1968)
- John Lie – professor of Sociology
- Leo Löwenthal – member of the Frankfurt School for Social Research; professor of Sociology (1956–1992)
- **Kristin Luker** (B.A. 1968) – professor of Law and professor of Sociology
- **John Levi Martin** (M.A. 1990, Ph.D. 1997) – professor of Sociology
- Neil Smelser – professor emeritus of Sociology
- Frederick John Teggart – professor of Social Institutions (1919–1946)
- Barrie Thorne – professor of Sociology and professor of Gender and Women's Studies
- Kim Voss – professor of Sociology and current chair of Sociology
- Loïc Wacquant – professor of Sociology

== See also ==
- List of University of California, Berkeley alumni
- List of University of California, Berkeley alumni in science and technology
- Category:University of California, Berkeley faculty
