= George W. Chang =

- Born: Long Island, New York
- Education: Princeton; University of California, Berkeley
- Occupation: Professor
- Known for: Papers with the Prof; Food Microbiology
- Spouse: Abby Jang
- Scientific career
- Fields: Microbiology
- Workplaces: University of California, Berkeley

George W. Chang is a professor and a resident faculty member at the University of California, Berkeley. He resides on campus with his wife Abby, while he is currently an Associate Professor Emeritus in the Department of Nutritional Sciences and Toxicology.

== Brief biography ==
=== Education ===
George W. Chang is the son of a professor. He was born in Long Island, New York, but grew up in New Mexico, just a few blocks away from the campus where his father worked. He pursued his undergraduate degree in chemistry at Princeton, where he lived in the residence halls. George then moved to Berkeley, California, in the 1960s in order to obtain a Ph.D. in biochemistry, completing his doctorate degree in 1967. Initially, Chang was a resident of the international student housing facilities known as the International House, or I-House. In 1964, Chang moved into an apartment on the north side of campus and resided in that area until he became a part of the Residential Faculty Program.

=== UC Berkeley ===
In 1970, Chang became part of the faculty in the College of Natural Resources. During the 1980s, he served on the campus's Maslach Commission, which made recommendations on improving undergraduates' time at Berkeley. Chang is currently an Associate Professor Emeritus in the Department of Nutritional Sciences and Toxicology, where he has taught for over 30 years. His concentration is food safety. As a food microbiologist, he works on foodborne illness and the microbiological safety of food and water supply.

In the late 1980s, Chang discovered that the state-of-the-art method for detecting E. coli held substantial flaws. The new test, produced by Chang, provided accurate results in a day's time, versus three or four days for the century-old coliform test. Chang and the undergraduate researcher became co-inventors on a patent for "Colitag", and on two patents since.

Chang has taught a seminar class in the past titled "The Freshman Experience". In the seminar, students pick discussion topics, interview fellow students and share their "research" findings in the class on topics ranging from dating and homework to gaining the Freshman 15 and trying to avoid parking tickets. He has also taught Nutritional Sciences and Toxicology 113, which focuses on food microbiology.

=== Involvement with student life ===
During the 1980s, Chang served on the campus's Maslach Commission, which made recommendations on improving undergraduates' time at Berkeley. Chang has served on numerous committees, including The Chancellor's Commission to Study the University's Responses to a Diversified Student Body, The Undergraduate Affairs Committee, and the Committee on Courses. Chang long has taken his support for undergraduates to the residence halls, first for many years as a frequent participant in residence-hall guest lectures, faculty dinners and other events. He is often asked to speak at Cal Student Orientation programs.

In the fall of 2005, Chang and his wife Abby moved into the residence halls at the University of California, Berkeley, as a part of the Residential Faculty Program. The program gives free room and board in exchange for eight hours of service a week, and is intended to allow students to better know the faculty. The couple live in a three-bedroom suite in Towle Hall of Unit 2, located on Haste Street. They are often seen walking together to and from the Crossroads dining commons. Chang traditionally wears a hat of some sort, providing the context for his popular saying "If I'm wearing a hat or cap, it's office hours," implying that it is almost always office hours.

Chang eats most meals at the dining hall. He keeps an office in the academic center, holds regular office hours and teaches a tai chi class on Sundays for his residence hall neighbors.

Chang is the sponsor for the program Papers with the Prof, as well as other random events throughout the school year. He has hosted a martial arts movie night in the past. He, along with Unit 1 live-in faculty member Duncan Williams, have appeared at Crossroads during finals week with free muffin tops to students studying for finals. Chang expresses interest in martial arts films, as well as tai chi. Chang is an avid traveler and has visited 49 states in the United States, mostly by Greyhound Bus or rail. He is also a fan of auto mechanics, and collects used police cars from auctions, earning him the nickname "Cop Car George".

Chang encourages as many students and residents as possible to add him as a friend on Facebook. He likes to comment on students' Facebook status updates.

== Papers with the Prof ==
Chang initiated a program in collaboration with one of the dining commons on site at Berkeley entitled "Papers with the Prof". "Papers with Prof" is a newspaper discussion group hosted at the Crossroads dining commons. Students and other guests at Crossroads are invited to read, mark-up, and discuss the daily selection of newspaper articles subscribed to by Chang. Such papers include The New York Times, the 'San Jose Mercury News, and the San Francisco Chronicle. It is not uncommon to see Chang and his wife eating and chatting with students either at Crossroads or the Unit 3 dining commons Cafe 3.

Chang maintains a YouTube account under the name "newspaperprof", which he uses to upload videos about study tips.

== See also ==
- University of California, Berkeley student housing
- University of California-Berkeley
- List of University of California, Berkeley alumni
- List of University of California, Berkeley faculty
- Escherichia coli
- Coliform bacteria
- Bacteriological water analysis
