= Christopher Lee Kutz =

American law professor

- Occupations: Author and academic

Academic background
- Education: B.A., Philosophy (Yale University); PhD, Philosophy (University of California, Berkeley); J.D. (Yale Law School)

Christopher Lee Kutz is an author and academic. He is a C. William Maxeiner Distinguished Professor of Law at the University of California, Berkeley.

Kutz's work centers on criminal law, political, moral, and legal philosophy, the foundations of international and constitutional law, and tort law. He is the author of Publics in Action: The Self-Making of Civic Life, On War and Democracy, and Complicity: Ethics and Law for a Collective Age.

== Education ==
Kutz completed a B.A. in Philosophy from Yale University in 1989. He subsequently earned a PhD in Philosophy from the University of California, Berkeley in 1996 and a J.D. degree from Yale Law School in 1997.

== Career ==
Following his J.D., Kutz was a law clerk to Stephen F. Williams at the U.S. Court of Appeals for the District of Columbia Circuit from 1997 to 1998. He then became an assistant professor of law at the University of California, Berkeley from 1998 to 2004. He has held the position of full professor of law there since 2004. In 2014, he was awarded the title of C. William Maxeiner Distinguished Professor of Law at the University of California, Berkeley. He also worked as the director of the Kadish Center for Morality, Law, and Public Affairs at the University of California, Berkeley, and is the faculty advisor and director of Berkeley's Philosophy, Politics, and Law Minor program there.

== Works ==
Kutz's book, Complicity: Ethics and Law for a Collective Age, was published by Cambridge in 2000 and explored the relationship between collective action and individual responsibility, looking into how individuals can be morally and legally responsible for harms arising from collective actions and institutions. Lary May, in his review, called it an excellent book; however, he also pointed out that the book underplays the role of causality and control. The book was also reviewed by Margaret Gilbert, who praised it as "lucid and stimulating." Garrath Williams commended it as "an important analysis of an important topic." John Gardner, however, questioned whether the book's central focus lay on personal liability, vicarious liability, or the distinction between them.

Kutz later published On War and Democracy in 2016, which examined how democratic values can both justify and restrain war, addressing the tensions between ethical principles, legal frameworks, and practices such as remote warfare, surveillance, and torture. James G. Mellon described the volume as a wide-ranging collection of essays linked by recurring themes, while also remarking that it did not resolve the dilemma of the society's lack of democratic political culture. John Keane characterized it as "thoughtful" and "erudite," though he noted a lack of analysis on the issue of violence occurring within democratic states. Pedro Moreira stated that it is "fresh" and "independent", particularly in its development of an "agentic" conception of democracy, while finding some critiques of democratic peace and torture unconvincing. Jonathan Parry regarded the work as "highly original" and "humane," while disagreeing with the author's reasoning on combatant immunity and his stance on torture.

In 2014, Kutz co-edited an undergraduate textbook in legal philosophy titled The Philosophy of Law alongside Jules Coleman and Joel Feinberg. In 2018, he edited The Will to Punish (The Berkeley Tanner Lectures), where he analyzed the foundations, purposes, and inequalities of punishment, arguing that modern punitive practices are historically contingent, socially unequal, and in need of critical rethinking. In 2025, he authored Publics in Action: The Self-Making of Civic Life, which assessed how democratic communities form and sustain shared institutions and values, contending that a vibrant public is an active, improvising collective shaped through dialogue and participation.

== Media coverage ==
Kutz has authored opinion articles for the Los Angeles Times and Le Monde on topics including the Dominique Strauss-Kahn case and tax obligations. Writing about the former, he stated that the case highlighted contrasts between U.S. and French justice, with America stressing equality before the law and France emphasizing dignity for the accused. He has also appeared as a guest to discuss the case on PBS and France 24.

== Awards and honors ==
- 2025 – Berkeley Faculty Service Award, University of California, Berkeley

== Books ==
- Kutz, Christopher (2000). Complicity: Ethics and Law for a Collective Age. Cambridge; New York: Cambridge University Press. ISBN 978-0521594523.
- Feinberg, Joel; Coleman, Jules L.; Kutz, Christopher, eds. (2014). Philosophy of Law (9th ed.). Boston, MA: Wadsworth Cengage Learning. ISBN 978-1133942962.
- Kutz, Christopher (2016). On War and Democracy. Princeton; Oxford: Princeton University Press. ISBN 978-0691167848.
- Fassin, Didier (2018). Kutz, Christopher (ed.). The Will to Punish (The Berkeley Tanner Lectures). New York (N.Y.): Oxford University Press. ISBN 978-0190888589.
- Kutz, Christopher (2025). Publics in Action: The Self-making of Civic Life. New York, NY: Oxford University Press. ISBN 978-0197692769.
