= Leslie Lipson =

American political scientist

Leslie M. Lipson (November 14, 1912 – August 11, 2000) was an American political scientist who was an expert in democracy and comparative government, and worked as a professor at universities in New Zealand and the United States. He was also a regular commentator on politics for media outlets such as PBS and the San Francisco Chronicle.

Lipson was born in Britain in 1912, and was a student at St Paul's School, London. He attended Balliol College, Oxford, and graduated with First-class honors in Classics and Literae Humaniores ("Greats"). Lipson moved to America after receiving a Commonwealth Fund Fellowship to complete a PhD in political science at the University of Chicago.

After finishing his doctorate, Lipson moved to Wellington, New Zealand, in 1939, to found a Department of Political Science at Victoria University of Wellington. He taught at Victoria for seven years, and in 1948 published a landmark book on New Zealand politics called The Politics of Equality: Adventures in New Zealand’s Democracy. Lipson argued that political and economic equality were the defining features of the country, and, in comparison to the Statue of Liberty in New York, suggested that "In New Zealand, if any sculptured allegory were to be placed at the approaches of Auckland or Wellington harbor, it would assuredly be a statue of Equality." The Politics of Equality was republished in 2011, and is still considered an essential work on New Zealand’s early political development.

Lipson moved back to the United States in 1947, taught at Swarthmore College for two years, and then was a professor at UC Berkeley from 1950 until his retirement in 1984. He received several teaching awards from students while at UC Berkeley, and was given the Berkeley Citation in 1980 for his service to the university.

Lipson’s published works included The American Governor: From Figurehead to Leader (1939), The Great Issues of Politics (1954), which became a standard introductory text, The Democratic Civilization (1964), and The Ethical Crises of Civilization: Moral Meltdown or Advance? (1993). He also published articles in American Political Science Review, The Political Quarterly and The Journal of Politics. Lipson’s papers are held at the Bancroft Library at UC Berkeley.
