= Michael Manga =

Canadian-American geoscientist (born 1968)

- Born: July 22, 1968 (age 58); Hamilton, Ontario, Canada
- Education: McGill University; Harvard University
- Awards: MacArthur Fellow
- Scientific career
- Fields: Earth and Planetary Sciences
- Workplaces: University of California, Berkeley
- Patrons: National Science Foundation
- Website: http://seismo.berkeley.edu/~manga/

Michael Manga (born July 22, 1968) is a Canadian-American geoscientist who is currently a professor at the University of California, Berkeley.

Born in Hamilton, Ontario, Manga grew up in Ottawa. His father is a South African immigrant of Indian descent, and his mother is of German and Polish descent. He has a B.S. in geophysics from McGill University (1990), S.M. in engineering sciences from Harvard University (1992), and Ph.D. in Earth and planetary sciences (1994) from Harvard.

In 1994 he was selected as a Miller Fellow at the University of California Berkeley for a two-year term. Following his move to the University of Oregon he returned to Berkeley. In 2008-2009 he was named a Miller Research Professor. He served on the executive committee of the Miller Institute between 2009 and 2016.

In 2003, he made Popular Science magazines second annual PopSci Brilliant 10 list and won the Geological Society of America's Young Scientist Award (Donath Medal).

A 2005 MacArthur Fellow, he won an award from the National Science Foundation (NSF) in support of his studies of geological fluid mechanics and magma flow prior to eruptions.

In November 2005, shortly after receiving the MacArthur, Manga made another list, the People's "Sexiest Man Alive" issue in which he admits that he agreed to be included because, "I wanted to get information out to people who wouldn't normally hear or see anything about science."

He was elected to the National Academy of Sciences in 2018.

His research interests include planetary science, fluid mechanics, hydrology, geodynamics, and physical volcanology.

== Academic Background ==
- 1986 Ontario Secondary Diploma, Lisgar Collegiate Institute, Ottawa, ON, CANADA
- 1990 B.S. (Geophysics) McGill University in Montreal, QC, CANADA
- 1992 S.M. (Engineering Sciences) Harvard University in Cambridge, MA USA
- 1994 Ph.D. (Earth and Planetary Sciences) Harvard University
