= Young Shin =

Korean American activist

- Occupation: Activist, university teacher

Young Hi Shin is an environmental justice activist who co-founded and directed the Asian Immigrant Women Advocates (AIWA), which fought for workers’ rights in the San Francisco Bay Area. She advocated for awareness around occupational health and an end to language discrimination for limited English speakers. Shin also works as a lecturer at University of California, Berkeley and has published in the academic journal Signs.

== Biography ==
Shin immigrated to the United States from Korea. In 1983, Shin co-founded AIWA. In 1991, Shin was among 301 delegates who convened in Washington, D.C. for the First National People of Color Environmental Summit. The work of Shin and Pam Tau Lee, co-founder of the Asian Pacific Environmental Network, at the 1991 summit ensured that occupational health issues were included in the draft of "Principles of Environmental Justice" created during the summit. This represented an important contribution to procedural justice and helped ensure that marginalized community members had a stake in environmental decisions that would impact their community. Additionally, both Lee and Shin are reported to have infused English classes with political education to enable immigrant women to better communicate workplace and environmental hazards.

In 2002, Shin was published in a report by Women's Environment & Development Organizations titled "a small world after all: Women Assess The State of the Environment In the U.S. and Beyond."

In 2013, she was featured in the documentary Becoming Ourselves: How Immigrant Women Transformed Their World, which was directed by Gary Delgado.
