= AnnaLee Saxenian =

American academic

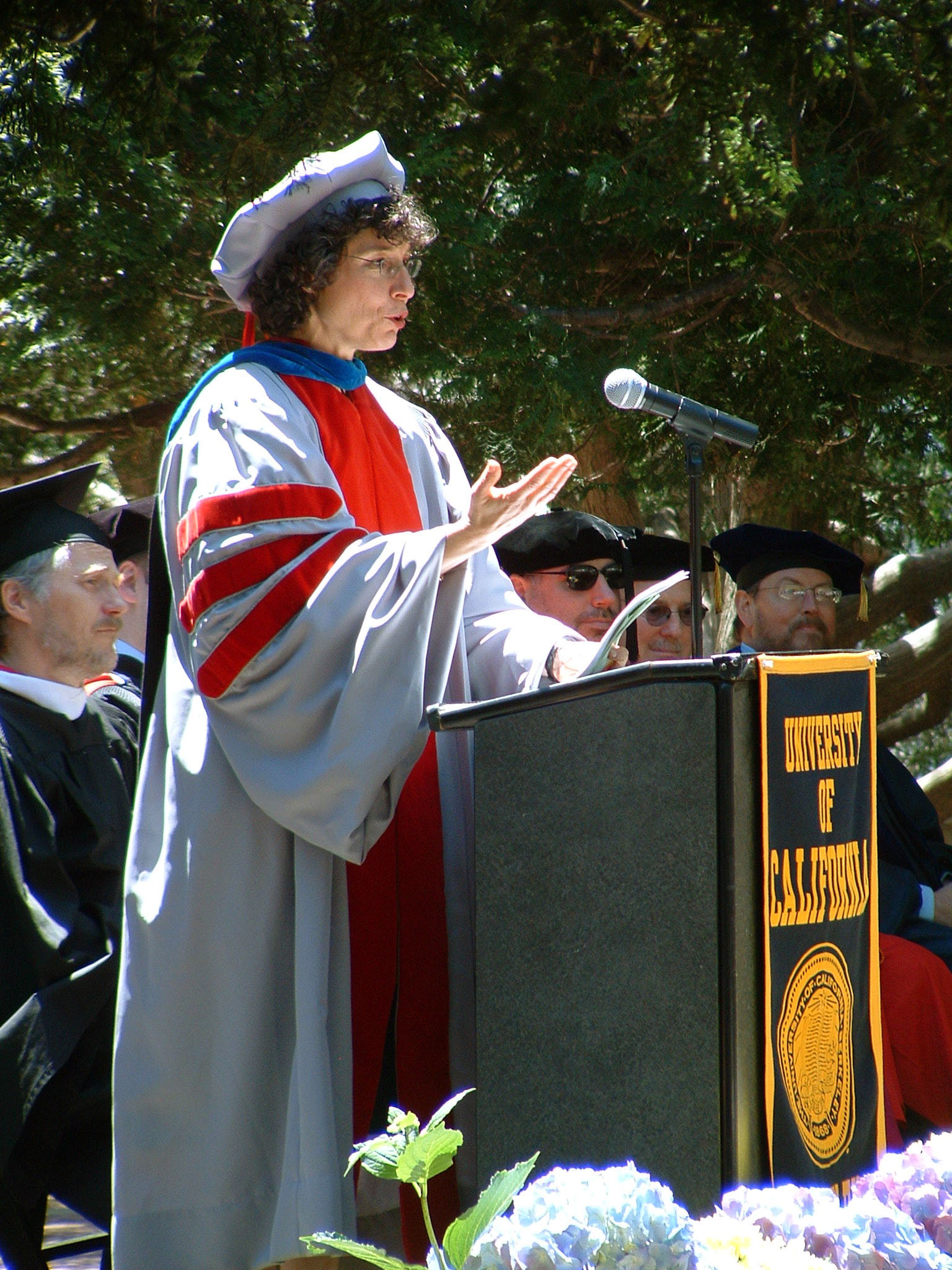
- AnnaLee Saxenian addressing graduates at the UC Berkeley School of Information 2006 commencement.
- Education: Williams College
- Alma mater: Massachusetts Institute of Technology
- Known for: Dean of the UC Berkeley School of Information
- Scientific career
- Fields: Technology clusters and social networks in Silicon Valley
- Workplaces: UC Berkeley School of Information
- Thesis: The political economy of industrial adaptation in Silicon Valley (1989)
- Doctoral advisor: Charles Sabel
- Doctoral students: danah boyd

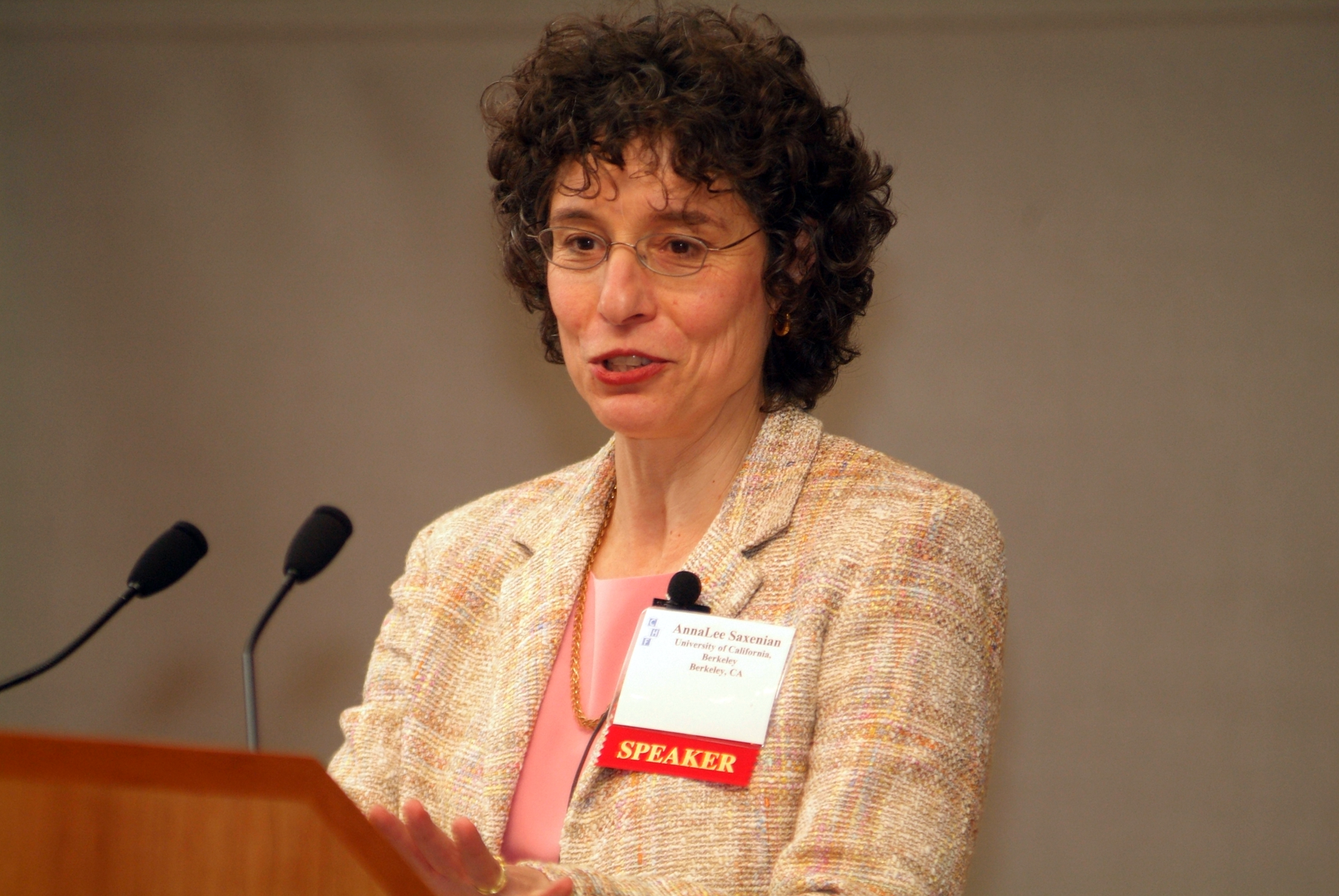
AnnaLee Saxenian, 2005

AnnaLee Saxenian (born 1954) is an American political economist whose research focuses on regional economic development, technological innovation, entrepreneurship, immigration, and information policy. She is known for her comparative study of Silicon Valley and the Route 128 technology region in Massachusetts, as well as her research on immigrant entrepreneurship and the international movement of technological expertise.

Saxenian was a professor at the University of California, Berkeley, with appointments in the School of Information and the Department of City and Regional Planning. She served as dean of the School of Information from 2004 to 2019. During her tenure, the school expanded its faculty and student body and introduced degree programs in information and data science and information and cybersecurity. In 2019, she received the Berkeley Citation for distinguished achievement and service to the university. In 2025, she retired from her faculty and administrative positions after 36 years at Berkeley.

== Early life and education ==
AnnaLee Saxenian grew up in Concord, Massachusetts, and graduated cum laude from Williams College in 1976 with a bachelor's degree in economics. From 1976 to 1978, she taught at United College of the Chinese University of Hong Kong, an experience that contributed to her interest in urban planning and international economic development.

She earned a Master of City Planning from the University of California, Berkeley, in 1980 and later worked as a consultant for the United Nations Centre on Transnational Corporations. She received a Ph.D. in political science from the Massachusetts Institute of Technology in 1989. Her research examined Silicon Valley's economic development, arguing that its network of firms and entrepreneurs supported innovation and the formation of startups despite rising costs and other regional constraints.

== Career ==
Saxenian began her academic career with appointments at the Massachusetts Institute of Technology and Harvard University before joining the University of California, Berkeley, in 1989 as a faculty member in the Department of City and Regional Planning. She subsequently held a joint appointment with Berkeley's School of Information, joining the school in 2000. She was also a visiting professor and senior fellow at Stanford University during 1999–2000. In 2004, Saxenian became dean of Berkeley's School of Information, then known as the School of Information Management and Systems. She served three terms, stepping down in 2019 and returning to her faculty role. During her deanship, the school was renamed the School of Information and underwent substantial institutional expansion. In 2019, Berkeley awarded Saxenian the Berkeley Citation, one of the university's highest honors, for distinguished achievement and notable service to the university. Saxenian retired from Berkeley in 2025 after approximately 36 years at the university.

Saxenian has served on Apple's Academic Advisory Board and chaired the Advisory Committee for the National Science Foundation's Division of Social, Behavioral, and Economic Sciences. She held visiting and research appointments at Stanford University, the Massachusetts Institute of Technology, the Chinese University of Hong Kong, and Tsinghua University's National Entrepreneurship Research Center.

In 1999–2000, she was a visiting professor and senior fellow at Stanford University. In 2009, she held the Wei Lun Visiting Professorship at the Chinese University of Hong Kong. Her fellowships included the Gordon Cain Senior Fellowship at Stanford's Institute for Economic Policy Research and an international doctoral research fellowship jointly associated with the Social Science Research Council and the American Council of Learned Societies.

== Research ==
=== Regional economic development ===
Saxenian's research examines the relationship between regional economic structures, institutions, social networks, and technological innovation. Her work emphasizes how interactions among firms, workers, universities, and financial institutions influence regional economic development.

Her book Regional Advantage: Culture and Competition in Silicon Valley and Route 128, published by Harvard University Press in 1994, compared the technology industries of Silicon Valley in California and Route 128 in Massachusetts. Saxenian attributed differences in their development to their industrial structures and patterns of interaction among firms.

She characterized Silicon Valley as a decentralized system of specialized firms, with substantial employee mobility and collaboration among businesses and universities. Route 128, by contrast, was dominated by vertically integrated firms with more independent organizational structures. She argued that Silicon Valley's interconnected business networks facilitated the exchange of knowledge and adaptation to technological change.

Regional Advantage received the Association of American Publishers' 1994 award for best professional and scholarly book in business and management. The book became an influential contribution to research on regional economic development, industrial organization, and technology clusters.

=== Immigrant entrepreneurship ===
Saxenian examined the role of immigration in technological development in Silicon Valley's New Immigrant Entrepreneurs, published by the Public Policy Institute of California in 1999. The study analyzed the participation of immigrant engineers and entrepreneurs in Silicon Valley's technology industry and their business connections with their countries of origin.

Her research documented the role of highly skilled immigrants in technology firms and start-up companies, challenging the view that immigrant entrepreneurship was concentrated mainly in small businesses serving ethnic communities. She examined how professional networks linking Silicon Valley with other countries facilitated the exchange of technical knowledge, investment, and business expertise.

Saxenian used the term brain circulation to describe the movement of knowledge and expertise through international networks of skilled migrants. She argued that immigrant entrepreneurs and engineers could contribute to the development of technology industries in their countries of origin while maintaining professional and business ties with the United States.

=== The New Argonauts ===
Saxenian developed the brain-circulation argument further in The New Argonauts: Regional Advantage in a Global Economy, published by Harvard University Press in 2006. The book examined immigrant engineers and entrepreneurs who developed businesses and professional networks linking Silicon Valley with technology centers in countries including China, India, Taiwan, and Israel.

=== Technology industries and entrepreneurship ===
Saxenian's research has addressed technological innovation, information policy, entrepreneurship, high-skilled immigration, and economic development in Asia. Her work examines the organization of technology industries and the relationships among firms, entrepreneurs, and international networks.

== Awards and honors ==
Saxenian's awards and distinctions include the Association of American Publishers' 1994 award for Regional Advantage, the 2019 Berkeley Citation, and recognition by Planning magazine in 2016 as one of the five leading academic scholars in planning in the United States. She has also received visiting professorships and research fellowships from institutions in the United States, Europe, and Asia.

== Bibliography ==
=== Books ===
- Regional Advantage: Culture and Competition in Silicon Valley and Route 128 Harvard University Press, 1994, ISBN 9780674753396
- The New Argonauts: Regional Advantage in a Global Economy Harvard University Press, 2007, ISBN 9780674025660
- Il vantaggio competitivo dei sistemi locali nell'era della globalizzazione. Cultura e competizione nella Silicon Valley e nella Route 128 FrancoAngeli, 2002, ISBN 9788846439710
- Silicon Valley's new immigrant entrepreneurs Public Policy Institute of California, 1999, ISBN 9781582130095
- The Silicon Valley-Hsinchu Connection: Technical Communities and Industrial Upgrading Stanford Institute for Economic Policy Research, 1999
- Local and Global Networks of Immigrant Professionals in Silicon Valley Public Policy Instit. of CA, 2002, ISBN 9781582130484
- America's New Immigrant Entrepreneurs 2012
- Regional networks and the resurgence of Silicon Valley Institute of Urban & Regional Development, University of California, 1989
- The Cheshire Cat's Grin: Innovation, Regional Development and the Cambridge Case Massachusetts Institute of Technology Department of Political Science, 1987
- The origins and dynamics of production networks in Silicon Valley Institute of Urban and Regional Development, University of California, 1990
- A Fugitive Success: Finland's Economic Future SITRA, 2008, ISBN 9789515636386

=== Refereed Journal Articles ===
- Berk, Gerald; Saxenian, AnnaLee (25 August 2023). "Rethinking Antitrust for the Cloud Era". Politics & Society. 51 (3): 409–435. doi:10.1177/00323292231183806. ISSN 0032-3292.
- Saxenian, AnnaLee; Sabel, Charles (2008). "Roepke Lecture in Economic Geography Venture Capital in the "Periphery": The New Argonauts, Global Search, and Local Institution Building". Economic Geography. 84 (4): 379–394. doi:10.1111/j.1944-8287.2008.00001.x. ISSN 0013-0095.
- Saxenian, AnnaLee; Sabel, Charles (31 August 2009), "The New Argonauts, Global Search and Local Institution Building", A Handbook of Industrial Districts, Edward Elgar Publishing, ISBN 978-1-78100-780-8
- Wadhwa, Vivek; Saxenian, AnnaLee; Rissing, Ben A.; Gereffi, Gary (2007). "America's New Immigrant Entrepreneurs: Part I". doi.org.
- Saxenian, AnnaLee (2005). "From Brain Drain to Brain Circulation: Transnational Communities and Regional Upgrading in India and China". Studies in Comparative International Development. 40 (2): 35–61. doi:10.1007/bf02686293. ISSN 0039-3606.
- Saxenian, Annalee (2002). "Transnational Communities and the Evolution of Global Production Networks: The Cases of Taiwan, China and India". Industry and Innovation. 9 (3): 183–202. doi:10.1080/1366271022000034453. ISSN 1366-2716.
- Saxenian, AnnaLee (2002). "Silicon Valley's New Immigrant High-Growth Entrepreneurs". Economic Development Quarterly. 16 (1): 20–31. doi:10.1177/0891242402016001003. ISSN 0891-2424.
