= Tomboy =

Girl who behaves boyishly

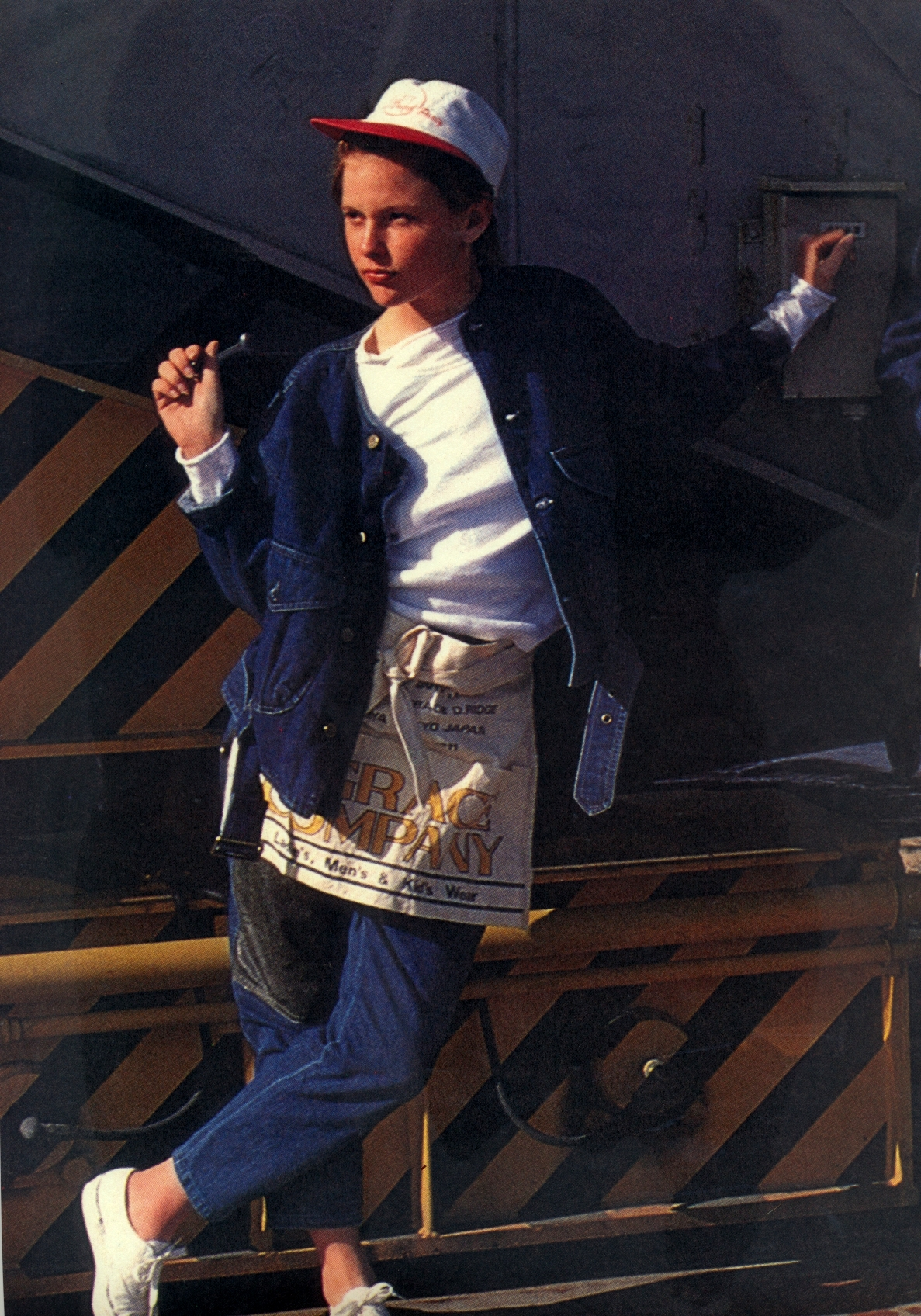
A tomboy

A tomboy is a girl or young woman who exhibits behaviors and traits typically associated with boys or men in a given culture, such as wearing androgynous or unfeminine clothing and engaging in activities traditionally considered masculine.

== Origins ==
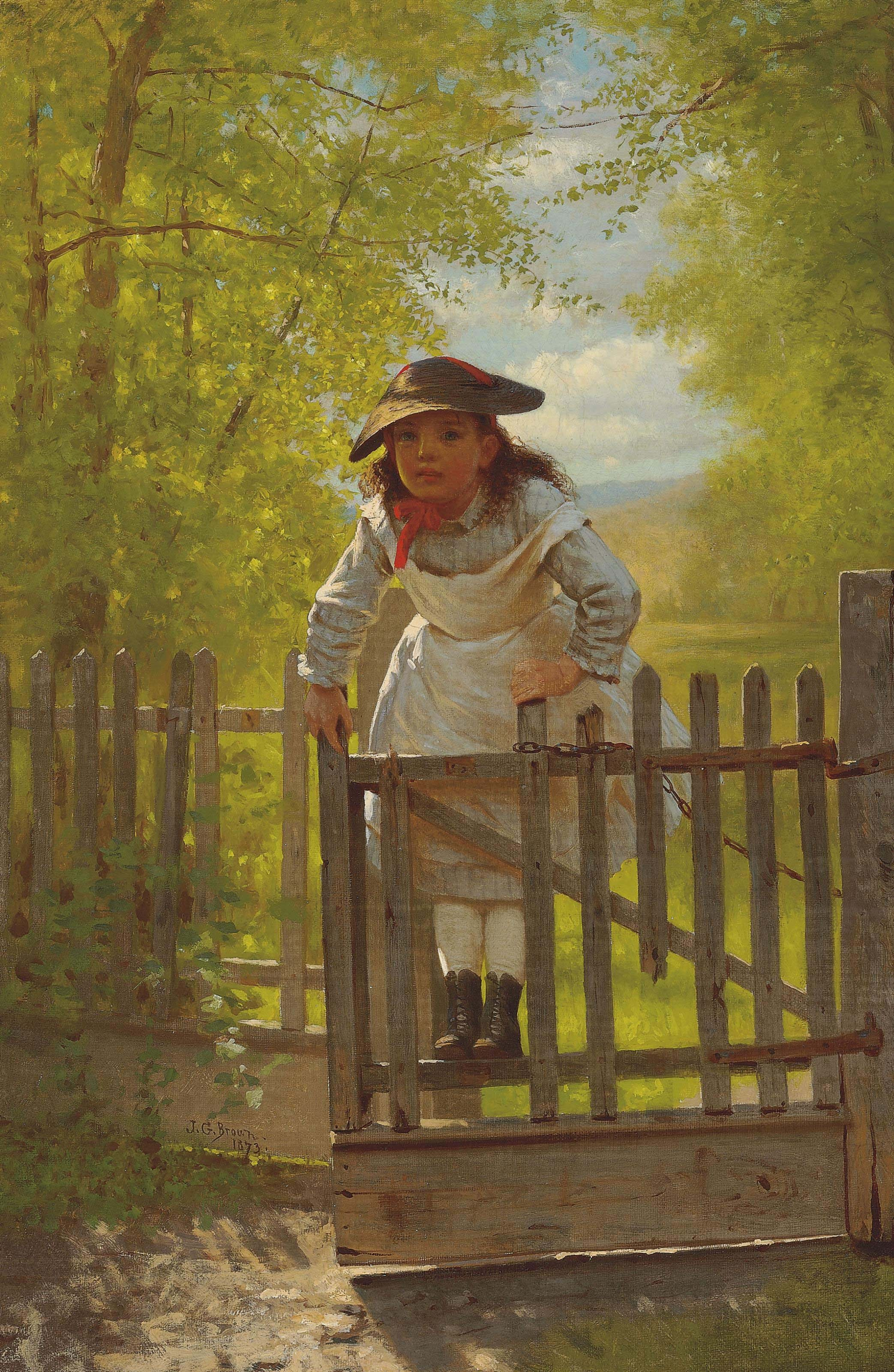
The Tomboy, 1873 painting by John George Brown

The word "tomboy" is a compound word which combines "tom" with "boy". Though this word is now used to refer to "boy-like girls", the etymology suggests the meaning of tomboy has changed drastically over time.

In 1533, according to the Oxford Dictionary of English, "tomboy" was used to mean a "rude, boisterous or forward boy". By the 1570s, however, "tomboy" had taken on the meaning of a "bold or immodest woman", finally, in the late 1590s and early 1600s, the term morphed into its current meaning: "a girl who behaves like a spirited or boisterous boy; a wild romping girl."

== History ==
=== In the United States ===
==== 19th century ====
Before the mid-19th century, femininity was equated with emotional fragility, physical vulnerability, hesitation, and domestic submissiveness, commonly known as the "Cult of True Womanhood". Under the influence of this ideal of femininity, women did not engage in strenuous sports or any physical activity. This paradigm remained stagnant until the mid-nineteenth century. During the Long Depression (1873-1899) of the late 19th century the US's increasing economic instability made fragile femininity no longer desirable. Young women joined the workforce to support their families and learn practical job skills, and thus a more robust physique was needed to support the physical demands of job practices. This led to the paradigm shift in people's expectations of young women from languishing, decorative beauty to vigorously healthy, thus laying the groundwork for tomboyism.

In Charlotte Perkins Gilman's 1898 book, Women and Economics, the author lauds the health benefits of being a tomboy, that girls should be "not feminine till it is time to be". Joseph Lee, a playground advocate, wrote in 1915 that a "tomboy phase" was crucial to physical development of young girls between the ages of 8 and 13. Coupled with the birth of first wave feminism and the US's depressed economy, tomboyism amongst young girls emerged because the young girls' parents permitted or even promoted the tomboy upbringing due to the decaying economy and the American turbulent political climate.

==== Late 19th century and Civil War ====
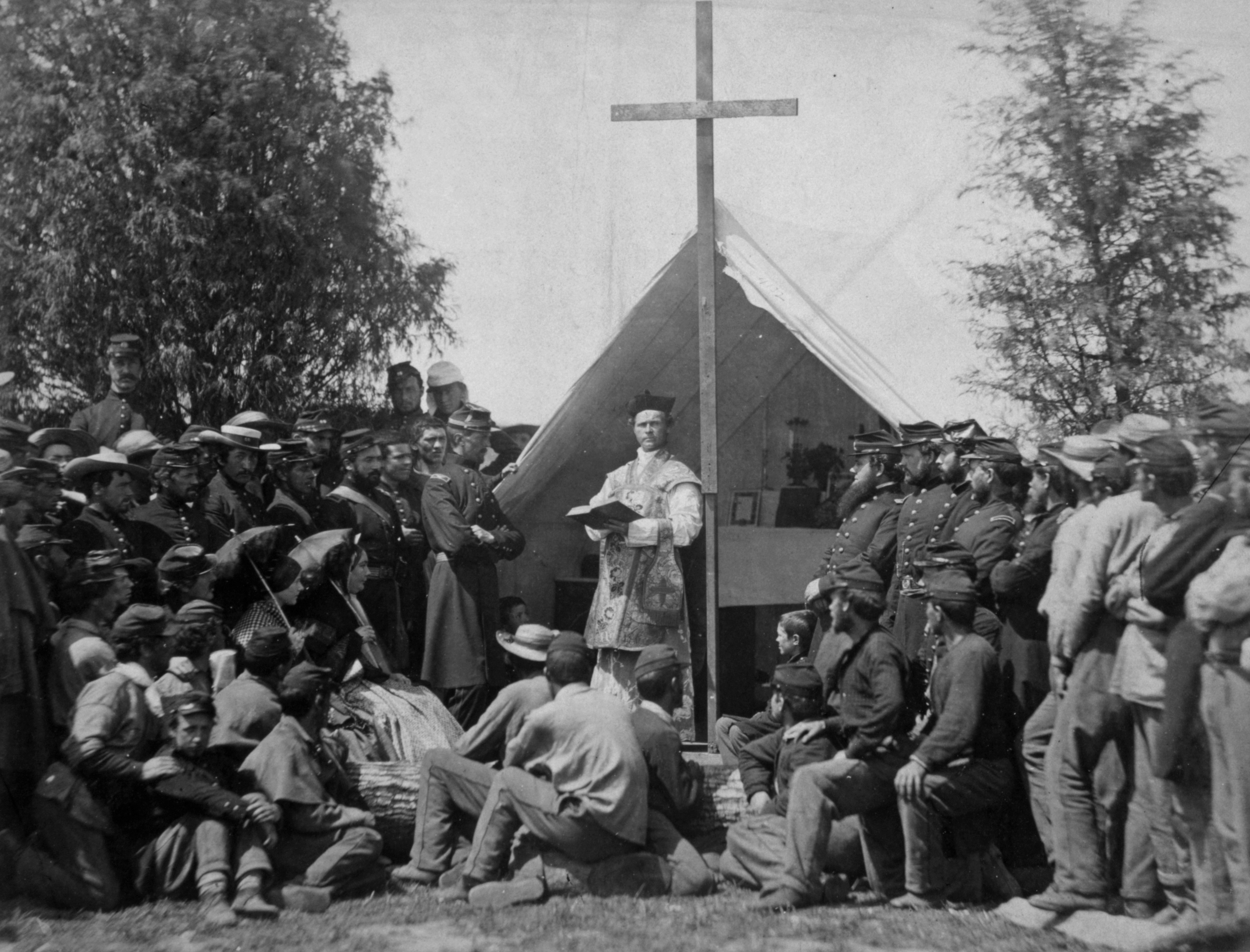
The army recruited men for the American Civil War, leaving the women behind to take care of the "left duties of men."

During the American Civil War, American women took on greater responsibilities. When hostilities of the North and South broke out and thousands of men fled to the battlefield, many adolescent girls and young women were pushed to be responsible for tasks that would be traditionally considered in the men's realm. Women who had not been allowed to have independent bank accounts were now expected to take care of the finances. American wives, mothers, and young girls who used to rely on the men in the household for security now had the duty of protecting their homes from the enemy. As a result, mothers focused on improving the physical constitution of their daughters while taking care of their own. Many women who had subscribed to the Cult of True Womanhood before the Civil War found themselves engaging in an array of masculine actions during it. Women being given the duties of men during the period of Civil War encouraged tomboyism.

==== 20th century: second wave feminism ====
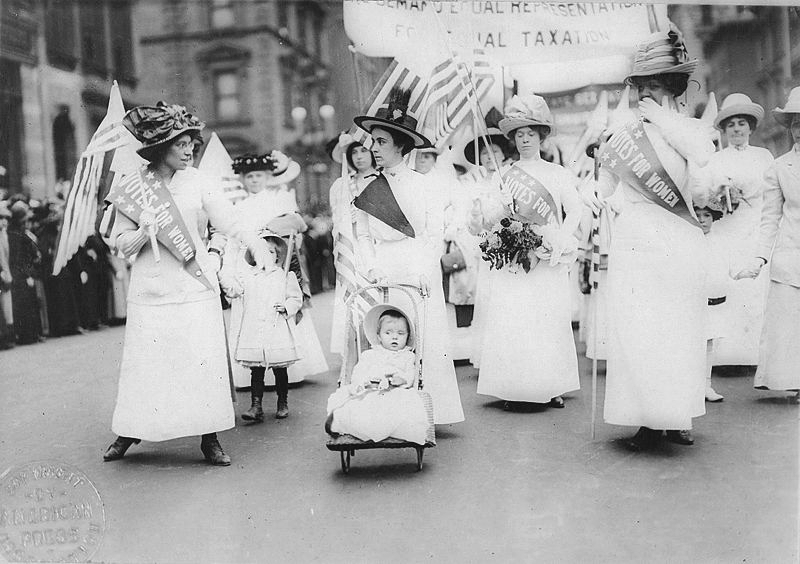
Feminist Suffrage Parade in New York City, 1912

While first wave feminism mainly focused on women's suffrage, second wave feminism expanded the discussion of gender inequality in areas such as sexuality, family dynamics, workspace, and laws in relation to patriarchy and culture. With the main purpose of critiquing the patriarchal system, this movement opened avenues for women in education, employment, and legal protection against domestic violence.

==== Late 20th century ====
In the late 20th century, the term tomboy describes girls who wear unfeminine clothing, actively engage in physical sports, and embrace what are often known as "boy toys" such as cars, or other activities usually associated with boys. The term is used less frequently than before in the West mainly because it is now a societal norm for adolescent girls to engage in physical activities, play with peers of the same and opposite gender, and wear comfortable clothing.

== Psychobehavioral aspects ==
=== Child development ===
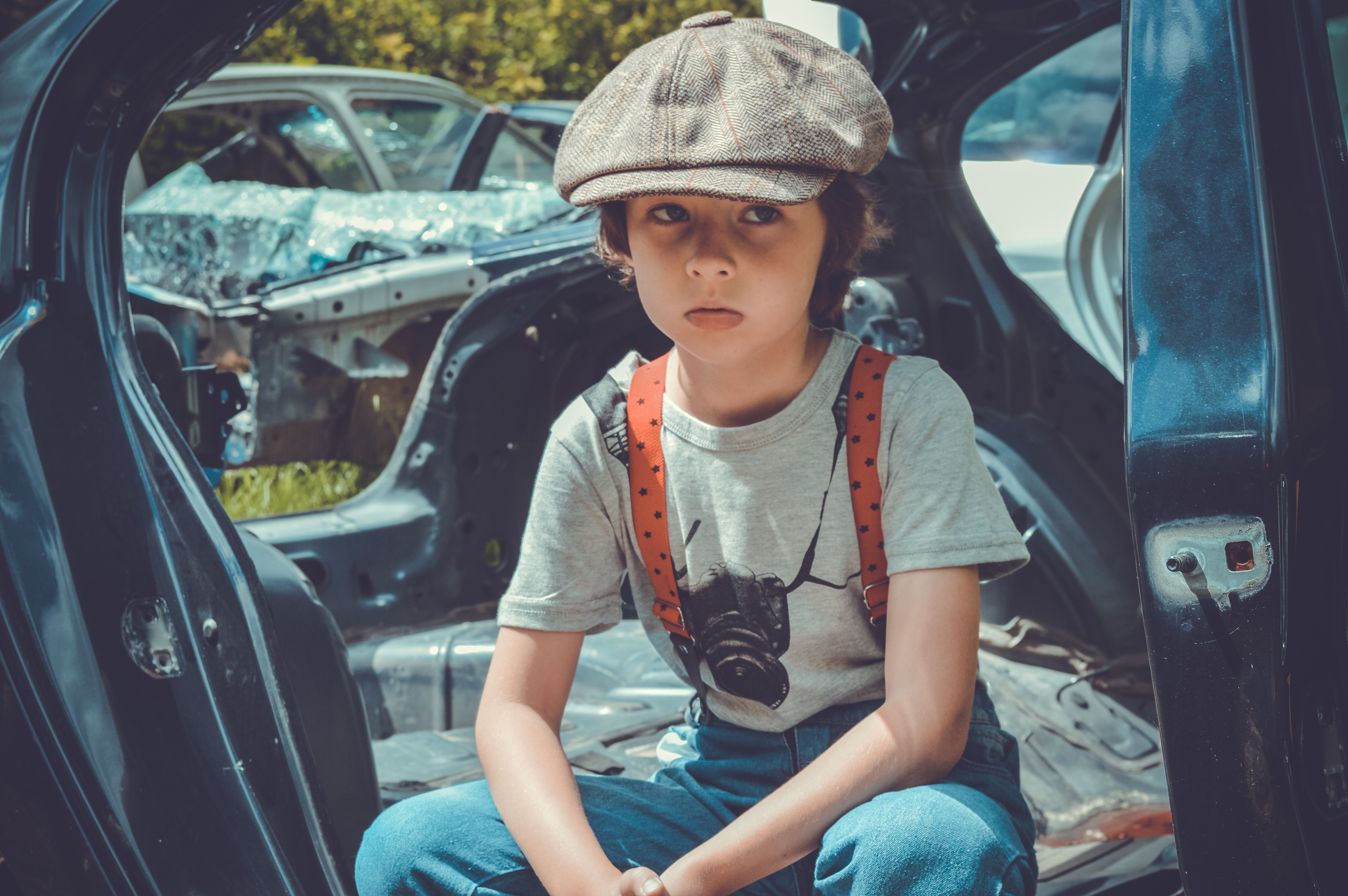
Tomboy is often a phase of gender presentation in childhood. It is not an indicator of sexual orientation or future gender display.

Tomboy can be seen as a phase of gender presentation in adolescence. Some girls start to embrace femininity as age increases while some persist to be tomboys in adulthood.

Psychologists speculate that childhood tomboy behavior results from a young child's innate curiosity combined with family dynamics and imposed societal gender roles and behavioral customs. The preference of athletics and masculine clothing can be explained by adolescent tomboys' curiosity about outdoors and physical games, by which comfortable clothing such as pants and t-shirts help to facilitate their physical engagement. A 2002 study suggests that some girls may be "born tomboys" because of the higher testosterone levels of the mother during pregnancy. Being a childhood tomboy does not influence or indicate a girl's eventual sexual orientation or life-long gender presentation.

=== Gender roles ===
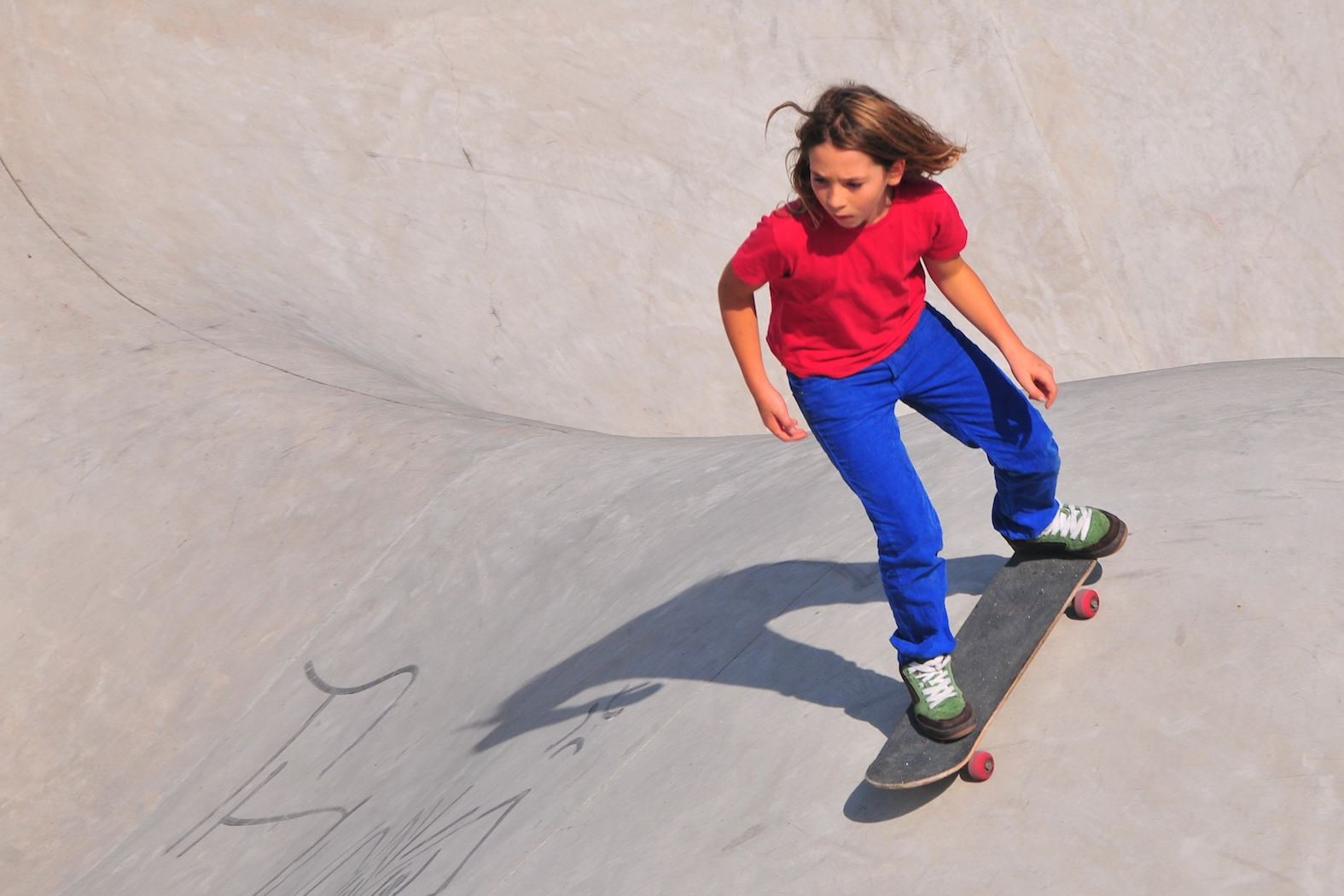
Girl riding a skateboard

The idea that there are girl activities and clothing, and that there are boy activities and clothing, is a concept known as gender roles. Tomboyism can be seen as refusing gender roles and traditional gender conventions, while also conforming to other gender stereotypes. The concept may be considered outdated or looked at from a positive viewpoint.

Feminine traits are often devalued and unwanted in society, and tomboys often respond to this viewpoint. This can be due in part to an environment that desires and only values masculinity, depending on the current culture in a particular geographical region. Tomboys may view femininity as having been pushed on them, which results in negative feelings toward femininity and those who embrace it. In this case, masculinity may be seen as a defense mechanism against the harsh push toward femininity, and a reclaiming of agency that is often lost due to sexist ideas of what girls are and are not able to do.

In western culture, tomboys are often expected to one day cease their masculine behavior, usually during or right before puberty, return to feminine behavior, and embrace and embody heteronormativity. Barbara Creed argues that the tomboy's "image undermines patriarchal gender boundaries that separate the sexes", and thus is a "threatening figure". This "threat" affects and challenges the idea of what a family must look like, generally nuclear independent heterosexual couplings with two children.

Gender scholar Jack Halberstam argues that while the defying of gender roles is often tolerated in young girls, adolescent girls who show masculine traits are often repressed or punished. However, the ubiquity of traditionally female clothing such as skirts and dresses has declined in the Western world since the 1960s, where it is generally no longer considered a male trait for girls and women not to wear such clothing. An increase in the popularity of women's sporting events (see Title IX) and other activities that were traditionally male-dominated has broadened tolerance and drastically lessened the impact of "tomboy" as a pejorative term. Sociologist Barrie Thorne suggested that some adult women take pride in describing their childhood selves as tomboys, "as if to suggest: I was (and am) independent and active; I held (and hold) my own with boys and men and have earned their respect and friendship; I resisted (and continue to resist) gender stereotypes".

In China, tomboys are called "假小子" (Pinyin: jiáxiǎozi), which literally translates as "pseudo-boy". This term is largely used as a derogatory term to describe those girls with masculine characteristics., and can be an insult which implies that the girl in question could not get a boyfriend.

=== Sexual orientation ===
==== Association of tomboyism with lesbianism ====
During the 20th century, Freudian psychology and backlash against LGBT social movements resulted in societal fears about the sexualities of tomboys, and this caused some to question whether tomboyism leads to lesbianism. Throughout history, there has been a perceived correlation between tomboyishness and lesbianism. For instance, Hollywood films would stereotype the adult tomboy as a "predatory butch dyke". Lynne Yamaguchi and Karen Barber, editors of Tomboys! Tales of Dyke Derring-Do, argue that "tomboyhood is much more than a phase for many lesbians"; it "seems to remain a part of the foundation of who we are as adults". Many contributors to Tomboys! linked their self-identification as tomboys and lesbians to both labels positioning them outside "cultural and gender boundaries". Psychoanalyst Dianne Elise's essay in 1995 reported that more lesbians noted being a tomboy than straight women.

==== Misconception ====
While some tomboys later reveal a lesbian identity in their adolescent or adult years, behavior typical of boys but displayed by girls is not an indicator of one's sexual orientation. With rising female liberation and gender-neutral playgrounds (at least in the US) in the 20th century, an increasing number of girls could technically be considered "tomboys" without being referred to as "tomboys" because it is now considered normal for girls to engage in physical activities, play equally with boys, and wear pants, masculine or gender-neutral clothing. This trend continued unabated into the 21st century. Any association between lesbianism and tomboyism is argued therefore to not only be outdated but also disrespectful to women.

== Representations in media ==
Tomboys in fictional stories are often used to contrast a more girly and traditionally feminine character. These characters are also often the ones that undergo a makeover scene in which they learn to be feminine, often under the goal of getting a male partner. Usually with the help of the more girly character, they transform from an ugly duckling into a beautiful swan, ignoring past objectives and often framed in a way that they have become their best self. Doris Day's character in the 1953 film Calamity Jane is one example of this. Tomboy figures who do not eventually go on to conform to feminine and heterosexual expectations often simply remain in their childhood tomboy state, eternally ambiguous. The stage of life where tomboyism is acceptable is very short and rarely are tomboys allowed to peacefully and happily age out of it without changing and without giving up their tomboyness.

Tomboyism in fiction often symbolizes new types of family dynamics, often following a death or another form of disruption to the nuclear family unit, leading families of choice rather than a descent. This provides a further challenge to the family unit, including often critiques of socially who is allowed to be a family – including critiques of class and often a women's role in a family. Tomboyism can be argued to even begin to normalize and encourage the inclusion of other marginalized groups and types of families in fiction including, LGBT families or racialized groups. This is all due to the challenging of gender roles, and assumptions of maternity and motherhood that tomboys inhabit.

Tomboys are also used in patriotic stories, in which the female character wishes to serve in a war, for a multitude of reasons. One reason is patriotism and wanting to be on the front lines. This often ignores the many other ways women were able to participate in war efforts and instead retells only one way of serving by using one's body. This type of story often follows the trope of the tomboy being discovered after being injured, and plays with the particular ways bodies get revealed, policed and categorized. This type of story is also often nationalistic, and the tomboy is usually presented as the hero that more female characters should look up to, although they still often shed some of their more extreme ways after the war.

== See also ==
- Androgyny
- Effeminacy
- En homme
- Femboy
- Geek girl
- Gender bender
- Gender variance
- Girly girl
- Joan of Arc
- Phallic woman
- Sex and gender distinction
- Sissy
- Social construction of gender
- Victorian dress reform
  - Trousers as women's clothing
- Wartime cross-dressers
