= Connected learning =

Connected learning is a type of learning in which a young person pursues a personal interest with friends and adults. This learning method is linked to academic achievement, career success, or civic engagement. The approach leverages new media to broaden access to opportunities and meaningful learning experiences. The connected learning model suggests that youth learn best when they are interested in what they are learning, have peers and mentors who share these interests, and their learnings are directed toward opportunity and recognition. According to the proponents of connected learning, social support for interest-driven learning and connections drive individual learning outcomes. Platforms that support connected learning are generally characterized as having a sense of shared purpose, a focus on production, and openly networked infrastructures.

== History ==
Connected learning has been a term used in research since the early 1990s. The original usages piggybacked on the concept of connected knowing, which emphasized the importance of context in the development of knowledge for women. The term was cited in a large number of articles around this time, in connection with hands-on education such as fieldwork or internships, which are tied to the concept of learning in context. Early research that used the term "connected learning" also shared the common theme of the importance of mentoring for learning outcomes. In 2000, the term "connected learning" began to be used in research publications to refer to various project-based, networked, social, and information-age learning. Cronwell and Cronwell created the first "framework and organizing set of principles to guide educational research and development (p.17). This research was supported by the Center for Internet Research. This connected learning framework is based on the following set of principles:

- The education process must become learner-centered;
- Assessment – diagnostic, formative, and summative – must be improved and deeply integrated into the learning and teaching process;
- National and state academic standards must be met or exceeded;
- Ethnic academic achievement gaps must be addressed and eliminated;
- Learning must become more active;
- The formation of lifelong learning behaviors must be facilitated;
- Education reform must be guided by empiricism;
- Well-designed, technology-enabled education reform will be self-improving, self-reforming and self-documenting;
- Teaching and learning content must be of the highest possible quality, current, and relevant;
- Proven pedagogical methodologies and the best research from all fields with a bearing on learning and teaching must be integrated into education;
- The needs of all stakeholders (students, teachers, parents, administration, government, business, etc.) must be served;
- Reform must also address the need to improve the formation and achievement of vocational goals by students, and
- Where minimum standards exist, the goal must be near-universal mastery rather than a standard distribution of achievement. (pp. 19)

This idea of connected learning is supposed to be an alternative to traditional in-school instruction. They label this connected learning framework as a work in progress that needs more research to support it. However, no further research has been completed on this framework.

== Examples ==
Examples of learning environments that integrate peer, interest, and academic pursuits include athletics programs that are tied to in-school recognition, certain arts and civic learning programs, and interest-driven academic programs such as math, chess, or robotics competitions. These connected learning environments embody values of equity, social belonging, and participation. Connected learning environments include a sense of shared purpose, a focus on production, and openly networked infrastructures. Learning platforms that embody principles of connected learning include:

- YOUmedia
- Harry Potter Alliance
- Quest to Learn
- North America Scholastic Esports Federation
- Connected Camps
- Vanta Leagues
- Prisma

== Reception ==
Connected learning, since its recent ramp-up, has been well received from the global education community. Educators and policymakers have raised concerns regarding the new model of learning laid out by research and practitioner groups, which included:

- Connected learning is another buzz word for the corporatization of education;
- Connected learning is devoid of critical thinking as it relies on a formula for students getting what they already want to find rather than broadening their horizons to discover what is not already known;
- The model makes no mention of key K–12 educators who have been pushing for similar types of networked/connected learning for the past decade, and
- Increased workload for those who support learners is also a concern.

Connected Learning Research Network chair Mimi Ito responded to the criticism by pointing out that, "the connected learning principles were developed with a very diverse range of practitioners in K–12 and other learning institutions like museums and libraries, as well as people working in popular culture/media, technology, and university researchers. So, while the research network hopes to provide a research component to feed the broader connected learning effort, we are by no means the driving force behind it.”
