= Pinkard =

Pinkard is a surname. Notable people with the surname include:

- John Henry Pinkard (1865–1934), American businessman, banker and spiritualist or quack doctor
- Josh Pinkard (born 1986), American football player
- Larry Pinkard (born 1992), American football player
- Maceo Pinkard (1897–1962), American composer, lyricist and music publisher
- Nichole Pinkard, American computer scientist
- Ron Pinkard (born 1941), American actor
- Terry Pinkard (born 1947), An American philosopher specializing in German philosophy.
