= Danah boyd =

American tech scholar (born 1977)

danah boyd
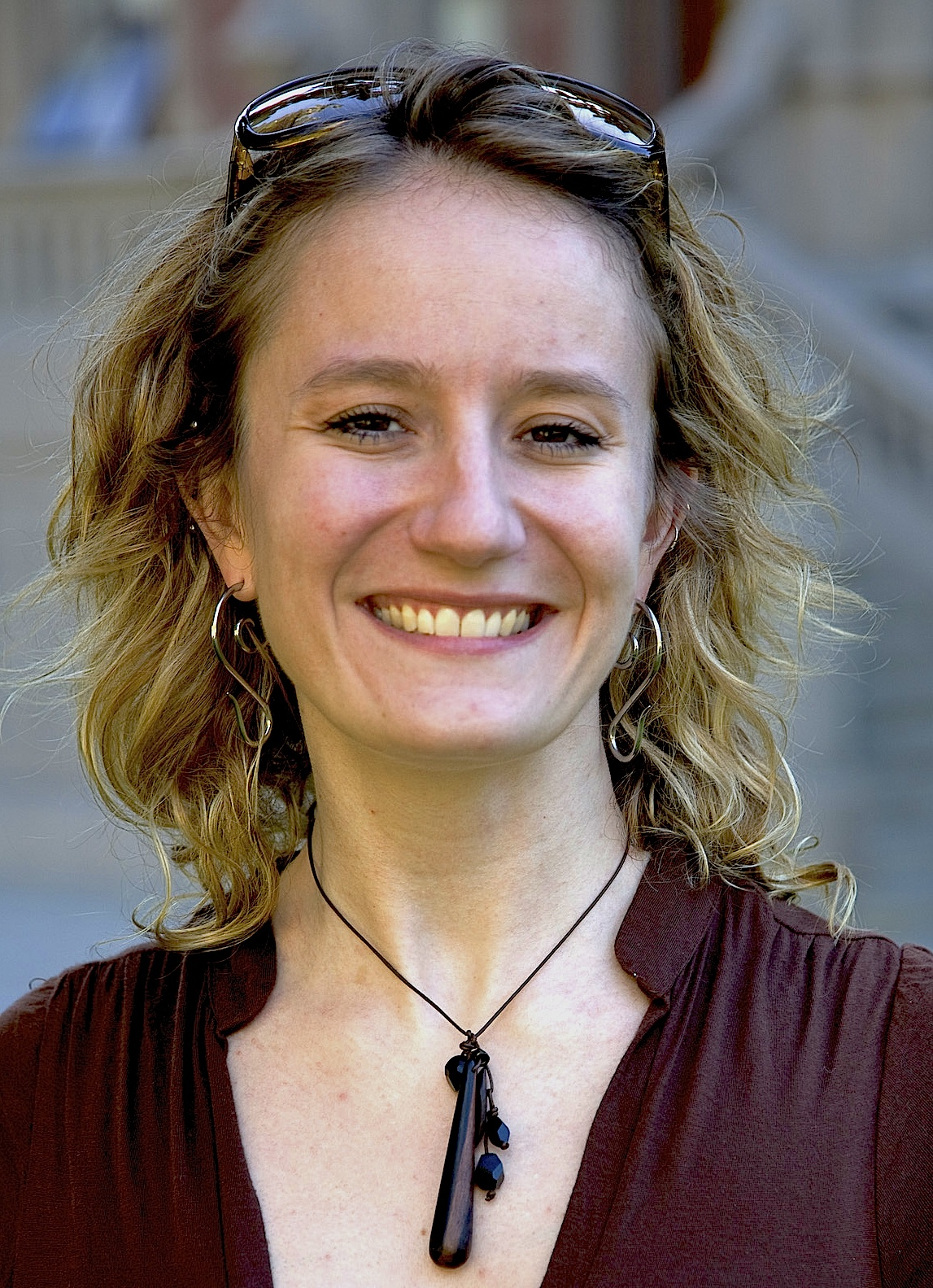
- boyd in 2008
- Born: Danah Michele Mattas; November 24, 1977 (age 48); Altoona, Pennsylvania, U.S.
- Education: Brown University (BA); Massachusetts Institute of Technology (MS); University of California, Berkeley (PhD)
- Known for: Commentary on sociality, identity, and culture among youth on social networks
- Spouse: Gilad Lotan
- Awards: Technology Review TR35 Young Innovators 2010
- Scientific career
- Fields: Social media
- Workplaces: Microsoft Research; Harvard University; New York University; Georgetown University
- Thesis: Taken out of context: American teen sociality in networked publics (2008)
- Doctoral advisor: Peter Lyman; Mizuko Ito
- Website: www.danah.org

danah boyd (born November 24, 1977 as Danah Michele Mattas) is an American technology and social media scholar. She is a partner researcher at Microsoft Research, the founder of Data & Society Research Institute, and a distinguished visiting professor at Georgetown University. As of March 2026 she is working as Professor of Communication at Cornell University.

== Early life and education ==
Boyd grew up in Lancaster, Pennsylvania, and Altoona, Pennsylvania. According to her website, she was born Danah Michele Mattas. She attended Manheim Township High School from 1992 to 1996. She used online discussions forums during high school. She called Lancaster a "religious and conservative" city. Having had online discussions on the topic, she began to identify as queer. A few years later, her brother taught her how to use IRC and Usenet. She became a participant on Usenet and IRC in her junior year in high school, spending a lot of time browsing, creating content, and conversing with strangers. Though active academically, boyd had a difficult time socially in high school. She credits "her survival to her mother, the Internet, and a classmate whose misogynistic comments inspired her to excel."

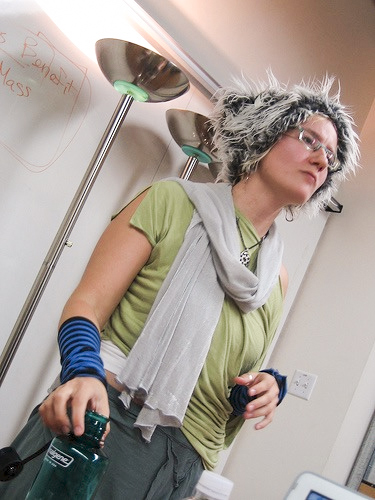
danah boyd in 2005, a speaker at Digital Identity conference in Chicago

At Brown University, boyd studied computer science and worked with Andries van Dam writing an undergraduate thesis about how visual depth cues in a virtual 3D environment affect depth perception. Once she reached college, she chose to take her maternal grandfather's name, Boyd, as her own last name. She decided to spell her name in lowercase so as "to reflect my mother's original balancing and to satisfy my own political irritation at the importance of capitalization."

She pursued her master's degree in social media with Judith Donath at the MIT Media Lab's Sociable Media Group. She worked for the New York-based activist organization V-Day, first as a volunteer (starting in 2004) and then as paid staff (2007–2009). She eventually moved to San Francisco, where she met the individuals involved in creating the new Friendster service. She documented what she was observing via her blog, and this grew into a career.

In 2008, boyd earned a Ph.D. at the University of California, Berkeley, School of Information, advised by Peter Lyman (1940–2007) and Mizuko Ito. Her dissertation, Taken Out of Context: American Teen Sociality in Networked Publics, focused on the use of large social networking sites such as Facebook and MySpace by U.S. teenagers, and was blogged on Boing Boing.

== Career ==
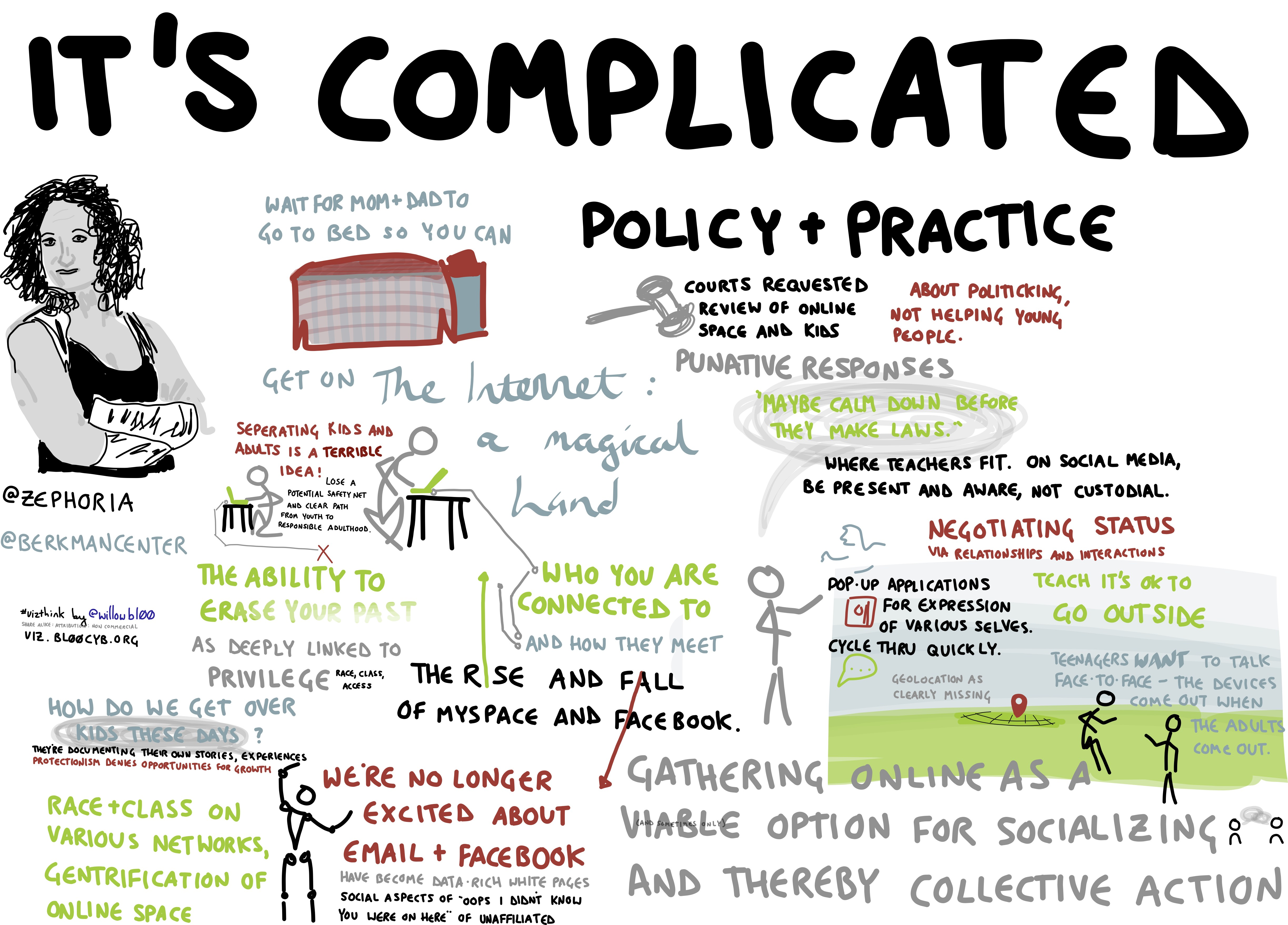
Visualization from one of boyd's lectures by Willow Brugh

While in graduate school, she was involved with a three-year ethnographic project funded by the MacArthur Foundation and led by Mimi Ito; the project examined youths' use of technologies through interviews, focus groups, observations, and document analysis. Her publications included an article in the MacArthur Foundation Series on Digital Learning, Identity Volume called "Why Youth (Heart) Social Network Sites: The Role of Networked Publics in Teenage Social Life." The article focuses on social networks' implications for youth identity. The project culminated with a co-authored book "Hanging Out, Messing Around, and Geeking Out: Kids Living and Learning with New Media."

During the 2006–07 academic year, boyd was a fellow at the Annenberg Center for Communication at the University of Southern California. She was a long-time fellow at the Berkman Center for Internet & Society at Harvard University, where she co-directed the Internet Safety Technical Task Force, and then served on the Youth and Media Policy Working Group.

In 2007, she published research on youth using Facebook and MySpace in Race After the Internet. She demonstrated that most young users of Facebook were white and middle-to-upper class, while MySpace users tended to be lower-class black teenagers. She argued that people tend to connect with like-minded individuals, also known as homophily, which perpetuates these enduring social hierarchies. Boyd focused on the concept of white flight by connecting the analogy to how white, privileged teens were forced to leave MySpace by their parents. Fueled by fear that MySpace was a "digital ghetto", parents of these teens were more welcoming of Facebook's network effects. Over time, these differences were exacerbated and led to the social reputation of these social media platforms.

Her work has been translated and relayed to major media. In addition to blogging on her own site, she addresses issues of youth and technology use on the DMLcentral blog. Boyd has written academic papers and op-ed pieces on online culture.

Her career as a fellow at Harvard's Berkman Center started in 2007. In January 2009, boyd joined Microsoft Research New England, in Cambridge, Massachusetts, as a Social Media Researcher.

In 2013, boyd founded Data & Society Research Institute to address the social, technical, ethical, legal and policy issues that were emerging from data-centric technological development.

As of 2022, boyd is president of Data & Society. Also as of 2022, she is a Partner Researcher at Microsoft Research and a visiting professor at Georgetown University and New York University. She has served on the board of directors of Crisis Text Line, a suicide hotline for people in the US, since 2012. In 2022 it came to light that Crisis Text Line had engaged in data-sharing with a for-profit AI company, Loris.ai. Boyd, on the board of Crisis Text Line, helped broker the covert and controversial data-sharing agreement, which used highly sensitive conversations involving suicidal and vulnerable people to help create customer service software. She is a 2026 Sloan Research Fellow.

She is also a Trustee of the National Museum of the American Indian, on the board of the Social Science Research Council, and on the advisory board of the Electronic Privacy Information Center (EPIC).

=== Books and book-length publications ===
- In 2008, boyd published her PhD dissertation titled Taken Out of Context: American Teen Sociality in Networked Publics at University of California, Berkeley.
- In 2009, boyd co-wrote Hanging Out, Messing Around, and Geeking Out: Kids Living and Learning with New Media with Mizuko Ito, Sonja Baumer, Matteo Bittanti, Rachel Cody, Becky Herr Stephenson, Heather A. Horst, Patricia G. Lange, Dilan Mahendran, Katynka Z. Martínez, C. J. Pascoe, Dan Perkel, Laura Robinson, Christo Sims and Lisa Tripp.
- In early 2014, boyd published her book It's Complicated: The Social Lives of Networked Teens at Yale University Press. In It's Complicated, boyd argues that social media is not as threatening as parents think it is and that it provides teenagers with a space to express their feelings and ideas without being judged.
- In 2015, Henry Jenkins, Mimi Ito, and boyd published Participatory Culture in a Networked Era at Polity Press.
- In 2026, boyd published Data Are Made, Not Found: A Story of Politics, Power, and the Civil Servants Who Saved the US Census at University of Chicago Press.

=== Peer-reviewed articles and academic contributions ===
- In 2011, boyd published a research paper with Microsoft Research and Harvard Berkman Center for Internet and Society titled White Flight in Network Publics? How Race and Class Shaped American Teen Engagement with MySpace and Facebook. This was published in the book Race After the Internet.
- In 2013, boyd co-wrote Keep it Secret, Keep it Safe: Information Poverty, Information Norms, and Stigma with Jessa Lingel. This was published in the Journal of the American Society for Information Science and Technology.

== Honors and awards ==
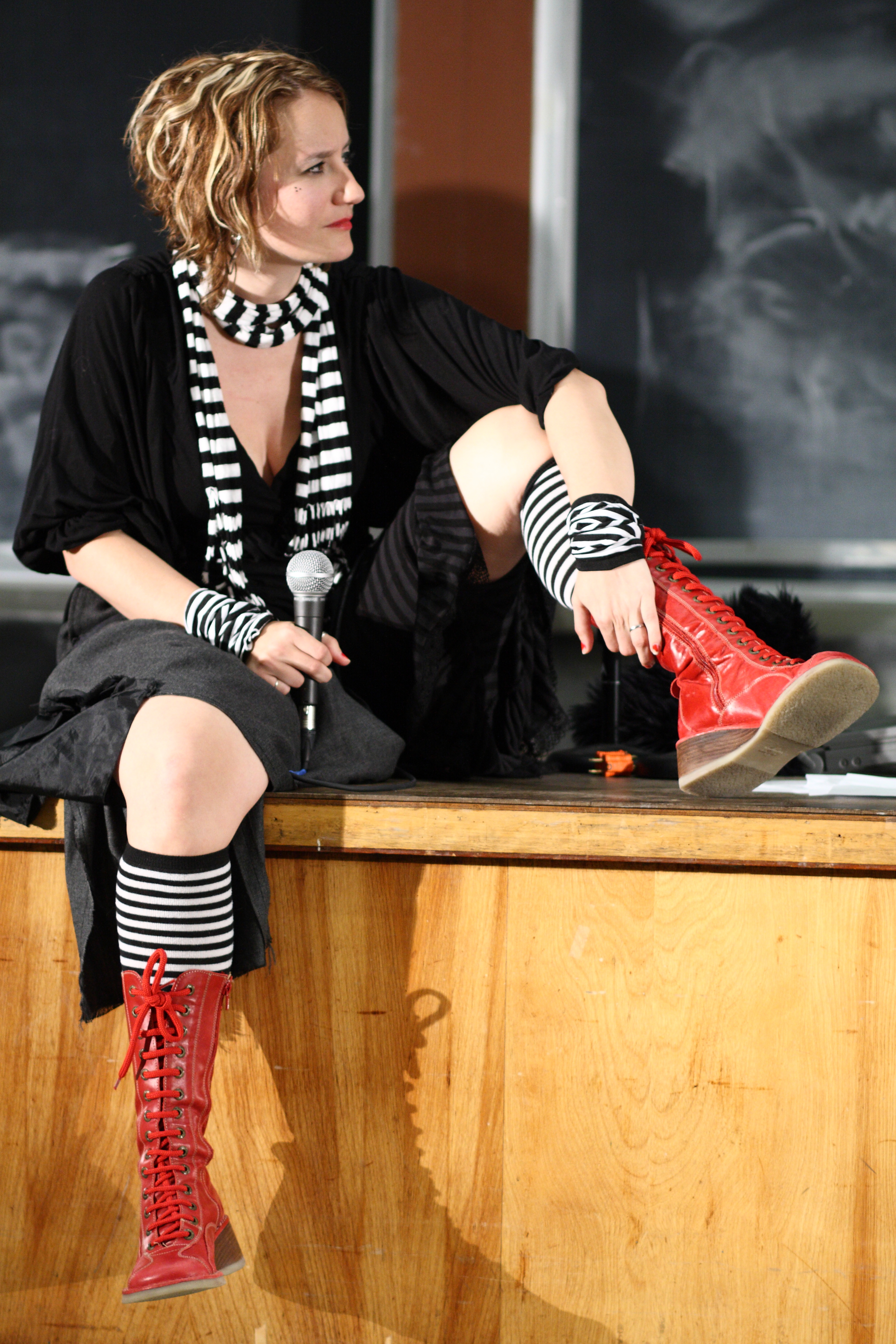
danah boyd giving a keynote at ROFLCon at MIT in 2010

In 2009 Fast Company named boyd one of the most influential women in technology. In May 2010, she received the Award for Public Sociology from the American Sociological Association's Communication and Information Technologies section. Also in 2010, Fortune named her the smartest academic in the technology field and "the reigning expert on how young people use the Internet." In 2010, boyd was included on the TR35 list of top innovators under the age of 35. She was a 2011 Young Global Leader of the World Economic Forum. Foreign Policy named boyd one of its 2012 Top 100 Global Thinkers "for showing us that Big Data isn't necessarily better data".

In 2019, boyd received the Electronic Frontier Foundation's Barlow/Pioneer Award for her work as a "Trailblazing Technology Scholar", and gave a keynote highlighting women's situation in the tech industry and specifically the controversies at the time involving the MIT Media Lab.

Boyd has spoken at academic conferences including SIGIR, SIGGRAPH, CHI, Etechm Personal Democracy Forum, Strata Data and the AAAS annual meeting. She gave the keynote addresses at SXSWi 2010 and WWW 2010, discussing privacy, publicity and big data. She also appeared in the 2008 PBS Frontline documentary Growing Up Online, providing commentary on youth and technology. In 2015, she was a speaker at Everett Parker Lecture. In 2017, boyd gave a keynote titled “Your Data is Being Manipulated” at the 2017 Strata Data Conference, presented by O’Reilly and Cloudera, in New York City. In March 2018, she gave a keynote titled "What Hath We Wrought?" at SXSW EDU 2018 and another keynote titled “Hacking Big Data” at the University of Texas at Austin, discussing data-driven and algorithmic systems. In November 2018, she was featured among "America's Top 50 Women In Tech" by Forbes.

In 2026, boyd was awarded the J. Anthony Lukas Work-in-Progress Award for her forthcoming book Data Are Made, Not Found: A Story of Politics, Power, and the Civil Servants Who Saved the U.S. Census.

== Personal life ==
Boyd has stated she has an "attraction to people of different genders", and identifies as queer. On her website, boyd notes that she attributes her "comfortableness with [her] sexuality to the long nights in high school discussing the topic in IRC". She is married and has three children.

== See also ==
- Context collapse
