= Mizuko Ito =

Japanese cultural anthropologist

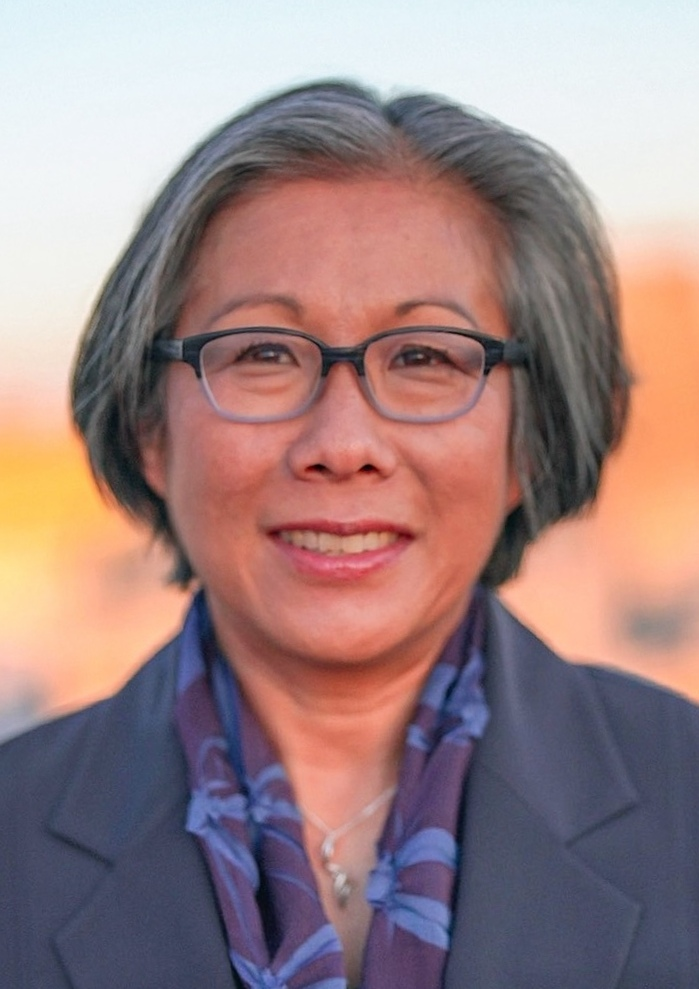
- Ito in 2023
- Born: July 22, 1968 (age 58); Kyoto, Japan
- Education: Ph.D.
- Alma mater: Harvard University (BA); Stanford University (MA, Ph.D.)
- Occupation: Anthropologist
- Spouse: Scott Fisher
- Children: 2
- Relatives: Joi Ito (brother)
- Website: http://itofisher.com/mito/

Mizuko Itō (sometimes rendered as Mizuko Ito) (伊藤瑞子, Itō Mizuko; born July 22, 1968), sometimes known as Mimi Ito, is a Japanese cultural anthropologist and learning scientist. She is Professor in Residence and John D. and Catherine T. MacArthur Chair in Digital Media and Learning, and Director of the Connected Learning Lab in the Department of Informatics, Donald Bren School of Information and Computer Sciences at the University of California, Irvine. Her main professional interest is young people's use of media technology. She has explored the ways in which digital media are changing relationships, identities, and communities.

Her work has been featured in Wired, CNN, NPR, The Hill, The New York Times, EdSurge, LitHub, The Atlantic, Fast Company, Lifewire, Gizmodo, and USA Today.

== Early life and education ==
Mizuko Ito grew up between the United States and Japan. In Japan, she attended Nishimachi International School and the American School in Japan.

She did her undergraduate work at Harvard University, graduating in 1990 with a degree in East Asian studies. Her thesis was titled Zen and Tea Ritual: A Comparative Analysis.

Ito did her graduate work at Stanford University. In 1991, she received a Masters of Arts degree in anthropology; her thesis was The Holistic Alternative: A Symbolic Analysis of an Emergent Culture. In 1998, she received a Ph.D. from the Department of Education for her dissertation, Interactive Media for Play: Kids, Computer Games and the Productions of Everyday Life. In 2003, she received a second Ph.D. from the Department of Anthropology for her dissertation, published in the book Engineering Play: A Cultural History of Children’s Software.

== Research ==
Ito has conducted a wide range of ethnographic research studies on how teens and young adults in Japan and the U.S. engage with new media and emerging technology. She has also led and participated in collaborative projects and research networks that have developed frameworks for research and design such as connected learning and youth participatory politics. These research areas can be categorized as follows:

=== Japanese youth culture ===
Ito has investigated young people’s engagement with Japanese popular culture in both Japan and the United States. Her early work in Japan focused on children’s engagement with Japanese transmedia such as Pokemon and Yu-gi-oh! and how Japanese teens led global adoption of text messaging, camera phones, and the mobile Internet. This work, in addition to work of other Japanese scholars, was published in 2005 by MIT Press, in a book Ito edited with Daisuke Okabe and Misa Matsuda, entitled Personal, Portable, Pedestrian: Mobile Phones in Japanese Life. Subsequently, she conducted research on otaku fan culture with collaborators Daisuke Okabe and Izumi Tsuji, which resulted in the book Fandom Unbound: Otaku Culture in a Connected World, published by Yale University Press in 2012.

=== Digital media and learning ===
In 2006, Ito received a MacArthur Foundation grant together with Peter Lyman and Michael Carter to conduct the largest ethnographic study of its kind, the Digital Youth Project, on how young people will learning differently through their adoption of digital games, social media, and mobile media. The book, Hanging Out, Messing Around, and Geeking Out, published in 2013 by MIT Press, reported on the outcomes of this study, and was co-authored with fourteen of the investigators who participated in the Digital Youth Project.

The Digital Youth Project was one of the first projects funded by what became the MacArthur Foundation’s Digital Media and Learning Initiative, which invested over $200 million in research and innovation. With David Theo Goldberg, Ito co-led the Digital Media and Learning Research Hub, a communications and capacity-building center for the initiative, housed in the University of California Humanities Research Institute.

As research director of the initiative, Ito also chaired the MacArthur Foundation Connected Learning Research Network and was a member of the MacArthur Foundation Youth and Participatory Politics Research Network between 2011 and 2018. The results of the Connected Learning Research Network were summarized in the 2013 report "The Connected Learning Research Network: Reflections on a Decade of Engaged Scholarship".

=== Connected learning ===
Building on the work of the Digital Media and Learning Initiative and Connected Learning Research Network, Ito has continued research, design, and impact-oriented work centered on the connected learning research and design agenda. In 2017, Ito launched the Connected Learning Lab (CLL) at UC Irvine, serving as its director. In 2019, CLL was recognized as an Organized Research Unit. It consists of an interdisciplinary group of 30+ UC Irvine faculty who collaborate to research, design and mobilize learning technologies in equitable, innovative and learner-centered ways. Through the CLL, Ito has continued to lead and co-lead a range of research projects related to connected learning, STEM, and arts learning funded by the MacArthur Foundation, National Science Foundation, Institute of Museum and Library Services, Google, Bill and Melinda Gates Foundation, Pivotal Ventures, STEM Next Opportunity Fund, and private industry partners.

Reports resulting from these projects include:

- "From Good Intentions To Real Outcomes: Equity By Design In Learning Technologies" (Digital Media and Learning Research Hub, 2017)
- "Influences on Occupational Identity in Adolescence: A Review of Research and Programs" (Connected Learning Alliance, 2019)
- "Asset and Action-Based Approaches to Civic Learning: A Review of Frameworks, Evidence and Approaches" (Connected Learning Alliance, 2022)
- "The Connected Arts Learning Framework: An Expanded View of the Purposes and Possibilities for Arts Learning" (Wallace Foundation, 2023)

=== Digital wellbeing ===
In 2019, Ito began a collaboration with Candice Odgers, Stephen Scheuller, and Katie Salen to investigate the relationship between diverse forms of teen engagement with digital technology and wellbeing. Notable outputs from this body of work include the report "Social Media and Youth Wellbeing: What We Know and Where We Could Go", published by the Connected Learning Alliance in 2020, and the edited collection "Algorithmic Rights and Protections For Children", published by MIT Press in 2023. Ito also helped lead the Connected Wellbeing Initiative, which supported innovators developing youth-driven solutions for healthy and empowered relationships with technology.

== Entrepreneurship and community organizing ==
Ito is the co-founder and executive director of the Connected Learning Alliance, a nonprofit organization that "envisions a world where the diverse interests, culture, and assets of young people connect and power education, civic and career opportunities."

With Katie Salen and Tara Tiger Brown, Ito also co-founded Connected Camps, a nonprofit that provides online learning programs in coding and the digital arts through popular platforms such as Minecraft and Roblox.

In 2018, Ito collaborated on the launch of the annual Connected Learning Summit conference with a committee of faculty and educational leaders, now stewarded by the Connected Learning Alliance.

== Personal life ==
Ito lives in Southern California with her husband, Scott Fisher, a virtual reality researcher. They have two adult children. When her kids were younger, she kept a "bento blog", a visual record of the school lunches she prepared for her kids.

Ito's brother is Joi Ito, president of Chiba Institute of Technology and former director of the MIT Media Lab.

== Selected publications ==
- Ito, Mizuko, Daisuke Okabe, Misa Matsuda, Eds. 2005. Personal Portable Pedestrian: Mobile Phones in Japanese Life. Cambridge: MIT Press.
- Ito, Mizuko, Heather A. Horst, Matteo Bittanti, danah boyd, Becky Herr Stephenson, Patricia G. Lange, C. J. Pascoe, and Laura Robinson. 2009. Living and Learning with New Media: Summary of Findings from the Digital Youth Project In The John D. and Catherine T. MacArthur Foundation Reports on Digital Media and Learning. Cambridge: MIT Press.
- Ito, Mizuko. 2009. Engineering Play: A Cultural History of Children's Software. Cambridge: MIT Press.
- Ito, Mizuko, Daisuke Okabe, Izumi Tsuji, Eds. 2012. Fandom Unbound: Otaku Culture in a Connected World. New Haven, CT: Yale University Press.
- Ito, Mizuko, Kris Gutiérrez, Sonia Livingstone, Bill Penuel, Jean Rhodes, Katie Salen, Juliet Schor, Julian Sefton-Green, S. Craig Watkins. 2013. Connected Learning: An Agenda for Research and Design. Irvine, CA: Digital Media and Learning Research Hub.
- Ito, Mizuko, Sonja Baumer, Matteo Bittanti, danah boyd, Rachel Cody, Becky Herr, Heather A. Horst, Patricia G. Lange, Dilan Mahendran, Katynka Martinez et al. 2013. Hanging Out, Messing Around, Geeking Out: Kids Living and Learning with New Media. Cambridge: MIT Press. ISBN 9780262518543.
- Jenkins, Henry, Ito, Mizuko, boyd, danah. 2016. Participatory Culture in a Networked Era: A Conversation on Youth, Learning, Commerce, and Politics. Polity.
- Mimi Ito and Justin Reich. From Good Intentions to Real Outcomes: Equity by Design in Learning Technologies. 2017 Oct. Digital Media and Learning Research Hub. https://clalliance.org/wp-content/uploads/2017/11/GIROreport_1031.pdf
- Ito, Mizuko, Crystle Martin, Rachel Cody-Pfister, Matthew H, Rafalow, Katie Salen Tekinbaş, Amanda Wortman. 2018. Affinity Online: How Connection and Shared Interest Fuel Learning. New York: NYU Press.
- Ito, Mizuko, Amanda Wortman, Stephen Campbell Rea, Jessica Callahan. Influences on Occupational Identity in Adolescence: A Review of Research and Programs. May 21, 2019. Connected Learning Alliance.
- Ito, Mizuko, Richard Arum, Dalton Conley, Kris Gutiérrez, Ben Kirshner, Sonia Livingstone, Vera Michalchik, William Penuel, Kylie Peppler, Nichole Pinkard, Jean Rhodes, Katie Salen Tekinbaş, Juliet Schor, Julian Sefton-Green, and S. Craig Watkins. 2020 The Connected Learning Research Network: Reflections on a Decade of Engaged Scholarship. Report. Irvine, CA: Connected Learning Alliance.
- Ito, Mizuko, Candice Odgers, Stephen Schueller, Jennifer Cabrera, Evan Conaway, Remy Cross, and Maya Hernandez. 2020. Social Media and Youth Wellbeing: What We Know and Where We Could Go. Report. Irvine, CA: Connected Learning Alliance.
- Ito, Mizuko, and Remy Cross. 2022. Asset and Action-Based Approaches to Civic Learning: A Review of Frameworks, Evidence and Approaches. Report. Irvine, CA: Connected Learning Alliance.
- Peppler, Kylie, Maggie Dahn, and Mizuko Ito. 2023. The Connected Arts Learning Framework: An Expanded View of the Purposes and Possibilities for Arts Learning. Report. Wallace Foundation.
- Ito, Mizuko, Remy Cross, Karthik Dinakar, and Candice Odgers. 2023. Algorithmic Rights and Protections for Children. Cambridge, MA: MIT Press.

== See also ==
- Digital anthropology
- Connected learning
