= Jack Liangjie Xu =

Chinese businessman

Jack Xu
- Born: Guangdong, China
- Education: Sun Yat-Sen University; University of California at Berkeley
- Occupations: Managing Partner of Seven Seas Venture; Former Co-President and Chief Technology Officer of Sina Corp

Jack Liangjie Xu (simplified Chinese: 许良杰; traditional Chinese: 許良傑), more commonly known as Jack Xu in English, is a Chinese software engineer, technology executive, and venture capitalist. He is the former Co-President and Chief Technology Officer (CTO) of SINA Corporation, the operator of Sina Weibo, the most influential social network in China. He formerly worked as the Corporate Vice President for Cisco's Unified Communications business unit, Vice President of Engineering & Research at eBay, and CTO at NetEase.

== Early life and education ==
Xu was born in Guangdong province of China. His father died when he was in his sophomore year of high school. He took the national college entrance examination a year early, and was accepted by Sun Yat-Sen University. After graduating with his B.A. and M.A., Xu went to the United States to pursue a PhD at the University of California Berkeley School of Information, where he was a member of Berkeley's Text Retrieval Conference (TREC) Competition team.

== Career ==
He began his career with Excite in 1996. In 1998, he began leading the development of the Excite search engine. From 2000 to 2002, Xu served as Chief Technology Officer at NetEase in Beijing, helping William Ding to promote the NetEase listed.

In October 2002, Xu returned to Silicon Valley. He was appointed as eBay's Vice President of Engineering & Research and oversaw eBay search, listings and research labs. In 2006, Xu was inducted as an eBay Fellow.

In May 2008 CEO John Chambers recruited him as Cisco's corporate vice president.

In 2013, Xu was named to the position of chief technology officer and co-president of Sina Corporation.

In March 2015, Jack Xu and Jeff Xiong (former CTO of Tencent) launched their venture capital firm, Seven Seas Venture Partners, to invest in early-stage start-ups.
