= Jeffrey MacKie-Mason =

American economist and librarian (born 1959)

- Born: 1959 (age 66–67); New York
- Citizenship: American
- Education: Massachusetts Institute of Technology; University of Michigan; Dartmouth College
- Scientific career
- Fields: Economics; Public Policy
- Workplaces: University of California, Berkeley; University of Michigan applEcon

Jeff MacKie-Mason is an American economist specializing in information, incentive-centered design and public policy. He is the university librarian and chief digital scholarship officer of the University of California, Berkeley, where he is also a professor in the School of Information and a professor of economics. At the University of Michigan he was the Arthur W. Burks Collegiate Professor of Information and Computer Science at the School of Information, professor of economics, and professor of public policy at the Gerald R. Ford School of Public Policy. MacKie-Mason was the founding director of STIET, a research program for Socio-Technical Infrastructure for Electronic Transactions funded by the National Science Foundation bridging together over 60 faculty and doctoral students in economics and computer science research.

== Academic work ==
MacKie-Mason has published over 100 research articles and has over 8,000 citations and an h-index of 39. He is best known for his research in industrial organization, Internet economics, computer science, and corporate finance and taxation. His studies of Internet pricing structures have received over 2500 citations. MacKie-Mason has consulted and testified in liability, damages, and policy issues for antitrust and regulatory matters since the early 1980s. He testified for the plaintiffs in the California class action against Microsoft Corporation which resulted in a $1.1 billion settlement for California consumers. He has also testified by deposition or at trial in cases involving Kodak, Office Depot, Lincoln Mercury and Ford, IBM, and other large companies.

MacKie-Mason received his A.B. from Dartmouth College in 1980, his Master of Public Policy from the University of Michigan in 1982, and his PhD from MIT in 1986. He was on the faculty at the University of Michigan in the Economics and Public Policy departments for 1986-2015 and in the School of Information 1996–2015. In 2013, MacKie-Mason and his wife, Janet Netz, pledged $2.5 million to the Michigan School of Information to create a new tenured chaired position. In 2016 he moved to the University of California, Berkeley.

MacKie-Mason has served on two advisory boards at the National Science Foundation, and has testified and advised with the U.S. Department of Justice and the U.S. Federal Trade Commission. He has received numerous awards, including the University Distinguished Faculty Achievement Award, the National Tax Outstanding Doctoral Dissertation Award, an Alfred P. Sloan Foundation Fellowship, a National Science Foundation fellowship, and was Phi Beta Kappa. He has been awarded over $9 million in research grants and has served on numerous academic program committees, panels, and board of directors.

== Personal life ==
MacKie-Mason is an avid piano player. He is married to Janet Netz, also an economist and a University of Michigan alumnus, and he has two adult sons.
