= Barrie Thorne =

American sociologist

- Born: 1942 (age 83–84); Utah, US
- Occupations: Sociologist, professor
- Title: Emerita Professor of Gender & Women's Studies and Sociology
- Awards: Jessie Bernard Award (2002)

Academic background
- Education: Stanford University; Brandeis University
- Thesis: Resisting the Draft: An Ethnography of the Draft Resistance Movement (1971)

Academic work
- Institutions: Michigan State University; University of Southern California; University of California, Berkeley
- Main interests: Women's studies, sociology of gender, sociology of the family, childhood studies
- Notable works: Gender Play: Girls and Boys in School (Rutgers, 1993)
- Website: UC Berkeley

Barrie Thorne (born 1942) is a professor of sociology and of Gender and Women's Studies at the University of California, Berkeley.

Her work focuses on the sociology of gender, feminist theory, the sociology of age relations, childhood, and families, and ethnographic methods. She is perhaps best known as author of the widely read book Gender Play: Girls and Boys in School which has been cited in over 170 books and over 500 publications.

In 2002, she received the American Sociological Association’s Jessie Bernard Award for lifelong achievement in opening sociology to the role of women in society.

Thorne is part of the generation of academic feminists who brought attention to women and gender into traditional fields of study and who created interdisciplinary programs and departments in gender and women's studies. She also helped bring the study of children and childhoods into the field of sociology, in her own research and teaching, as an editor of Childhood: A Global Journal of Child Research, and, from 1995 to 2003, as a member of the MacArthur Foundation Research Network on Successful Pathways through Middle Childhood.

== Biography ==
Born in Utah, Thorne attended Stanford University, receiving her bachelor's degree with Great Distinction and with Honors in Anthropology and Honors in Social Thought and Institutions in 1964. Thorne received her M.A. in sociology in 1967 and her Ph.D. in sociology in 1971, both from Brandeis University. She also conducted graduate work in Social Anthropology at the London School of Economics from 1964 to 1965.

From 1971 to 1985, Thorne was a member of the Sociology faculty at Michigan State University, moving from assistant to associate to full professor; she also helped create the MSU Women's Studies Program. During those years, she was also a Visiting assistant professor of sociology at the University of California, Santa Cruz (1976–1977 and 1980–1981) and at Stanford University (1981–1982).

In 1987, she moved to the University of Southern California with an appointment as the Streisand Professor in the Program for the Study of Women and Men in Society and as a professor of sociology. In 1995, she moved to University of California, Berkeley, to become Professor of Sociology and of Gender and Women's Studies, a position which she still holds today. She was appointed Chair of the Gender and Women's Studies Department in 2003 and, from 1998 to 2002, served as Director of the UC Berkeley Center for Working Families. She was elected to membership in the honorary society, Sociological Research Association, in 1993. She was also Vice President of the American Sociological Association from 1993 to 1994.

Thorne's late husband, Peter Lyman, was a professor at the UC Berkeley School of Information until he retired in 2006. They have two children, Dr. Andrew Thorne-Lyman, a nutrition scientist at WorldFish and Adjunct Lecturer at the Harvard T.H. Chan School of Public Health and Abigail Thorne-Lyman, Principal Planner at BART. They also have four grandchildren. Barrie Thorne's siblings are Dr. Avril Thorne, a professor at University of California, Santa Cruz in the field of personality, and Nobel Prize winner Dr. Kip Thorne, a professor at California Institute of Technology in the field of gravity.

== Teaching ==
Thorne is well known for her upper division undergraduate courses in the gender and women's studies and sociology departments that focus on the division of gender and on feminist theory. She also teaches courses on the sociology of childhood, family, and the practices of ethnography. She has won awards for her teaching and mentoring, including Distinguished Faculty Mentor Award from the Graduate Assembly at the University of California, Berkeley in 2011, the Mentor of the Year Award from the Society for the Study of Symbolic Interaction in 1998, the Sociologists for Women in Society Outstanding Mentorship Award in 1993, and the University of Southern California Raubenheimer Award for Outstanding Teaching, Research, and Service to the university in 1992.

== Associations ==
- American Sociological Association, 1975–present
- Society for the Study of Social Problems, 1975–present
- Sociologists for Women in Society, 1983–present
- International Sociological Association
- Pacific Sociological Association
- Council on Contemporary Families, Founding member
- The National Women's Studies Association

== Awards ==
- Distinguished Faculty Mentor Award from the Graduate Assembly at the University of California, Berkeley, 2011
- Townsend Center for the Humanities Senior Fellow, 2003.
- American Sociological Association Jessie Bernard Award, 2002 “given annually in recognition of scholarly work that has enlarged the horizons of sociology to encompass fully the role of women in society.”
- Norwegian Research Council, Social Scientist Visiting Fellowship, 2002.
- Michigan State University Faculty Women's Association Distinguished University Woman, 1982.
- Phi Beta Kappa, Stanford University, 1963.
- Marshall Scholarship, 1964.
- Woodrow Wilson Fellowship, 1964.

== Selected publications ==
Thorne has written and edited a number of books, chapters, and journal articles.

- Barrie Thorne, “The Chinese Girls and the ‘Pokémon Kids’: Children Constructing Difference in Urban California.” Forthcoming in Jennifer Cole and Deborah Durham, eds., Figuring the Future: Children, Youth, and Globalization. Santa Fe, NM.
- Barrie Thorne, “How Can Feminist Sociology Sustain its Critical Edge?” Social Problems (2006), 53: 473–478.
- Barrie Thorne, “Lunchtime at Sunnydale Elementary School: What Do First-grader's Need?” In Heather B. Weiss, Holly Kreider, M. Elena Lopez, and Celina M. Chapman, eds., Preparing Educators to Involve Families: From Theory to Practice. Thousand Oaks CA: Sage Publishing, 2005, pp. 57–65.
- Catherine R. Cooper, Cynthia García Coll, Barrie Thorne, and Marjorie Faulstich Orellana, “Beyond Demographic Categories: How Immigration, Ethnicity, and ‘Race’ Matter for Children at School." In Catherine R. Cooper, Cynthia García Coll, Todd Bartko, Helen Davis, and Célina Chapman, editors, Developmental Pathways Through Middle Childhood: Rethinking Contexts and Diversity as Resources. Hillsdale, N.J. : Lawrence Erlbaum, 2005, pp. 181–206.
- Feminist Sociology: Life Histories of a Movement, edited by Barbara Laslett and Barrie Thorne. New Brunswick, NJ: Rutgers University Press, 1997.
- Gender Play: Girls and Boys in School by Barrie Thorne. New Brunswick, NJ.: Rutgers University Press, and Buckingham, England: Open University Press, 1993.
- Language, Gender and Society, edited by Barrie Thorne, Cheris Kramarae, and Nancy Henley. Rowley, Mass.: Newbury House, 1983.
- Rethinking the Family: Some Feminist Questions, edited by Barrie Thorne, with Marilyn Yalom. New York: Longman, 1982.
- Language and Sex: Difference and Dominance, edited by Barrie Thorne and Nancy Henley. Rowley, Mass.: Newbury House, 1975.
