= Scott Fisher (technologist) =

American artist and technologist

Scott S. Fisher
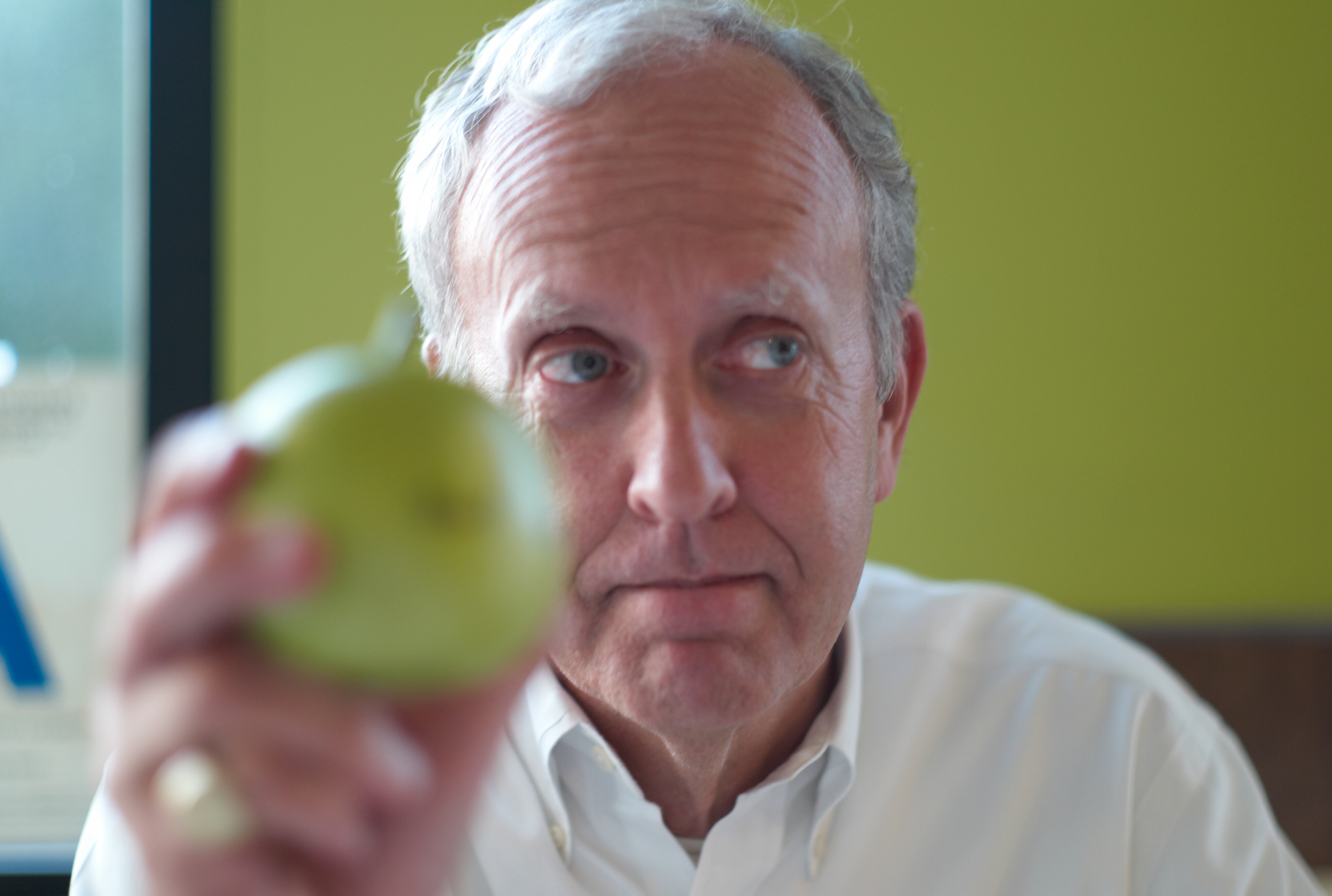
- Scott Fisher holding a plastic apple
- Spouse: Mizuko Ito
- Children: 2

Scott Fisher is the Professor and Founding Chair of the Interactive Media Division in the USC School of Cinematic Arts at the University of Southern California, and Director of the Mobile and Environmental Media Lab there. He is an artist and technologist who has worked extensively on virtual reality, including pioneering work at NASA, Atari Research Labs, MIT's Architecture Machine Group (now the MIT Media Lab) and Keio University.

== Early life ==
Scott S. Fisher was born in 1951 in Bryn Mawr, Pennsylvania, near Philadelphia. He was educated at MIT, receiving a Master of Science degree in Media Technology in 1981. His thesis advisor there was Nicholas Negroponte. There he participated in the creation of the Aspen Movie Map.

== Career ==
Much of Fisher's career has focused on expanding the technologies and creative potentials of virtual reality. Between 1985 and 1990, he was founding Director of the Virtual Environment Workstation Project (VIEW) at NASA's Ames Research Center. They attempted to develop a simulator to enable space station maintenance rehearsal. The gloves and goggles often associated with virtual reality were developed there, along with the dataglove, head-coupled displays and 3D audio.

In 1989, with Brenda Laurel, Fisher founded Telepresence Research, a company specializing in first-person media, virtual reality and remote presence research and development. Fisher, Joseph M. Rosen and Phil S. Green developed a robotic system called the Green SRI telepresence surgical system. Fisher and Joseph M. Rosen developed a virtual environment system for viewing and manipulating a model of the human leg.

Fisher was Project Professor in the Graduate School of Media and Governance at Keio University. There he led a project to allow users to author and view location-based data superimposed over the physical world, a progenitor of what is now termed augmented reality.

In 2001, Fisher moved to the University of Southern California to spearhead their new Interactive Media Division within the School of Cinematic Arts. There, he established the division's research initiatives in the mediums of immersive, mobile and video games. He chaired the division from its founding through 2011.

== Personal life ==
Fisher lives in Southern California with his wife, Mizuko Ito, a cultural anthropologist studying media technology, and their two children.

In addition to his other interests, he harbors a fascination with stereoscopy and 3D imaging, as well as Jamaican music.

== Selected publications ==
=== Papers and conference proceedings ===
- O'Reilly Emerging Technologies Conference (2004).
- Virtual reality worlds continue to develop by Glen Fraser and Scott S. Fisher in ACM SIGGRAPH Newsletter v.32, no.3 1998.
- "An Authoring Tool Kit for Mixed Reality Experiences" in International Workshop on Entertainment Computing (2002),
- "Micro Archiving and Interactive Virtual Insect Exhibit" in Stereoscopic Displays and Virtual Reality Systems IX (2002),
- "Environmental Media: Linking Virtual Environments to the Real World" in Creative Digital Media: Its Impact on the New Century (2001),
- "Environmental Media: Accessing Virtual Representations of Real-Time Sensor Data and Site-specific Annotations Embedded in Physical Environments" in Proc. of the Seventh Int'l Conf. on Virtual Systems and Multimedia, Berkeley (2001).
- Fisher, Scott S. "Virtual Environments: Personal Simulations & Telepresence." In Virtual Reality: Theory, Practice and Promise, S. Helsel and J.Roth, ed., Meckler Publishing, 1991.
- Fisher, Scott S. "Virtual Interface Environments." In The Art of Human-Computer Interface Design, B. Laurel, ed., Addison-Wesley Publishing Co., 1990.
- Fisher, S. "Telepresence Master Glove Controller for Dexterous Robotic End-Effectors," Advances in Intelligent Robotics Systems, D.P.Casasent, Editor, Proc. SPIE 726, (1986). [SPIE Cambridge Symposium on Optical and Optoelectronic Engineering, 26–31 October 1986. Cambridge, Massachusetts.]
- Fisher, S. S., McGreevy, M., Humphries, J., Robinett, W., "Virtual Environment Display System", ACM 1986 Workshop on 3D Interactive Graphics, Chapel Hill, North Carolina, October 23–24, 1986.
- Fisher, Scott S. "Virtual Interface Environment," IEEE/AIAA 7th Digital Avionics Systems Conference, Fort Worth, Texas, October 13–16, 1986.
- Fisher, S. Viewpoint Dependent Imaging: An interactive stereoscopic display. Masters Thesis, Massachusetts Institute of Technology, Cambridge, Massachusetts. October, 1981.

== Media appearances ==
- Cyberpunk (1990)
