= UC Berkeley School of Information =

Graduate school of the University of California

Coordinates: 37°52′16.77″N 122°15′30.71″W

University of California, Berkeley School of Information
- Former names: School of Information Management and Systems (1994–2006)
- Type: Public graduate school
- Established: 1994
- Dean: Eric T. Meyer
- Location: Berkeley, California, USA
- Website: ischool.berkeley.edu

The University of California, Berkeley School of Information (sometimes abbreviated as Berkeley I School) is a graduate school at the University of California, Berkeley, a public university in Berkeley, California. The school was established in 1994 as the School of Information Management and Systems (SIMS) and was renamed to its current name in 2006.

The school offers four degree programs: Master of Information Management and Systems, Master of Information and Data Science, Master of Information and Cybersecurity, and Doctor of Philosophy in information science.

== Curriculum ==
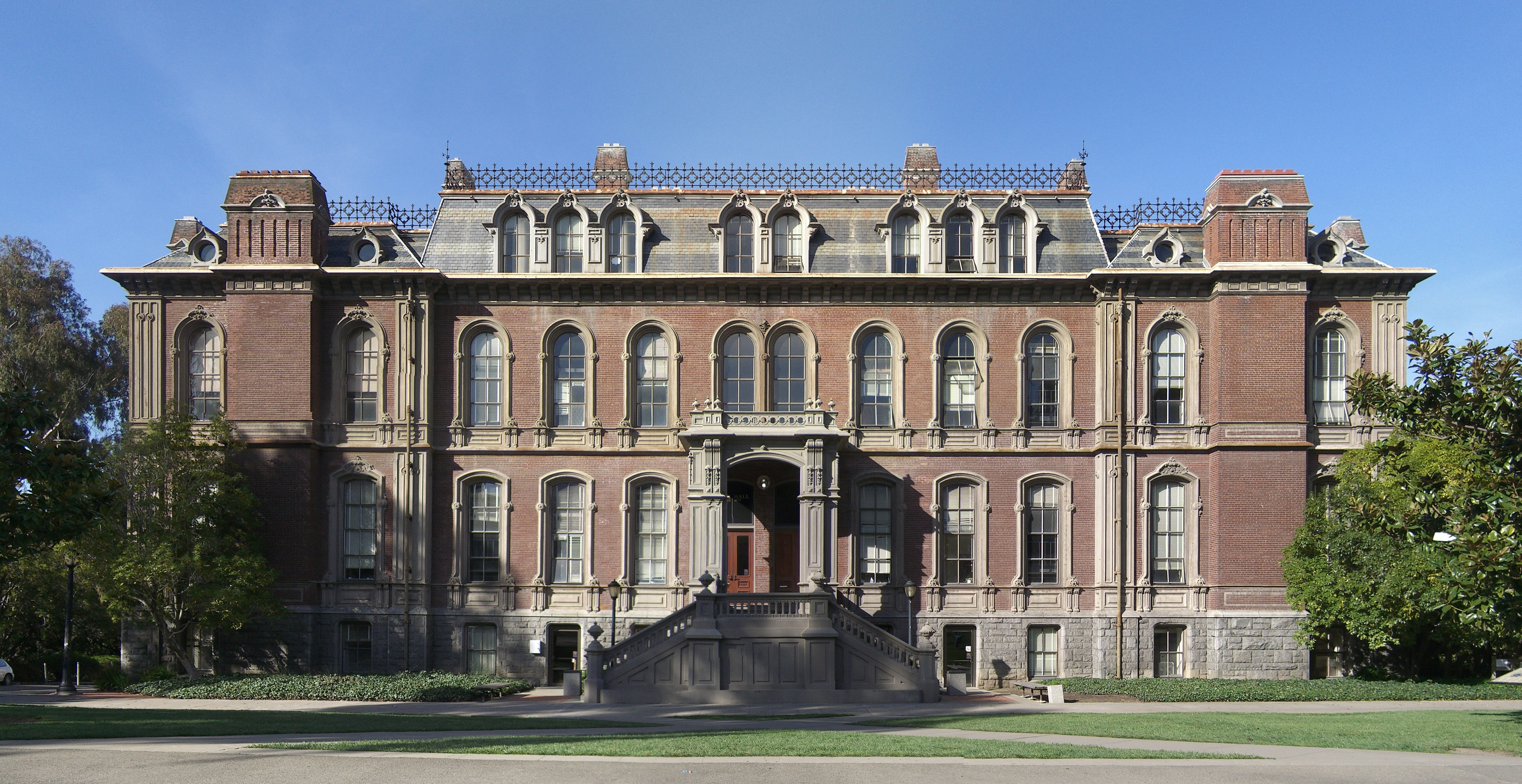
South Hall

=== MIMS program ===
The Master of Information Management & Systems (MIMS) program is a 48 unit, two-year program designed to train students for careers as information professionals. Students who complete the program are awarded the Masters of Information Management and Systems (MIMS) degree. During the first year MIMS students take required courses in Information Organization and Retrieval, Distributed Computing Applications and Infrastructure, Social and Organizational Issues of Information, and Information Law and Policy. During the second year students may choose from elective courses both at the I School and in other departments. The final prerequisite for the MIMS degree is the completing of a group or individual thesis project.

=== MIDS program ===
The Master of Information and Data Science (MIDS) program is a Masters program that trains data science professionals and managers. The MIDS program is distinguished by its disciplinary breadth with course requirements including research design, ethics and privacy, data visualization, along with data engineering, machine learning, and statistical analyses. The program is made up of 27 units with three program paths: a standard path that students complete in approximately 20 months where students are enrolled in 2 classes on average, per term; an accelerated path where students may take three courses per term and graduate in as few as 12 months; and a decelerated path where students may take one course per term and complete the degree program in no more than 32 months.

=== MICS program ===
The Master of Information and Cybersecurity (MICS) degree program advances a holistic approach to cybersecurity, engaging students in technical as well as human aspects of the discipline. Courses include cryptography, software security, operating system security, network security, privacy engineering, cyber risk management, applied machine learning for cybersecurity, usable privacy and security, and the economic, legal, behavioral, and ethical impacts of cybersecurity. The Master's in Cybersecurity is delivered online through weekly small class size video conferencing with faculty, and pre-recorded video lectures.

=== PhD program ===
The doctoral program is a research-oriented program in which the student chooses specific fields of specialization, prepares sufficiently in the literature and the research of those fields to pass written and oral examinations, and completes original research culminating in the written dissertation. The degree of Doctor of Philosophy is conferred in recognition of a candidate's grasp of a broad field of learning and distinguished accomplishment in that field through contribution of an original piece of research revealing high critical ability and powers of imagination and synthesis.

== Notable faculty ==
This list is limited to current and past members of the faculty notable enough to have an individual page in Wikipedia.

- Michael Buckland
- Karen Chapple (affiliated faculty)
- Hany Farid
- Morten Hansen
- Marti Hearst
- Chris Hoofnagle (adjunct)
- Peter Lyman
- Clifford Lynch (adjunct)
- Jeffrey MacKie-Mason
- Deirdre Mulligan
- Geoffrey Nunberg (adjunct)
- Pamela Samuelson
- AnnaLee Saxenian
- Hal Varian
- Steven Weber

== Notable alumni ==
- Nate Agrin, Jessica Kline, Kenichi Ueda (iNaturalist founders)
- danah boyd
- Heather Ford
- Holly Liu
- Jack Liangjie Xu
- Ashkan Soltani

== South Hall ==
The School of Information is located in the historic South Hall. Built in 1873, it is the oldest building in the University of California system. South Hall is located in the heart of campus, near the Doe Library and the Campanile (also known as Sather Tower). The small bear was added by Michael H. Casey, who did the ornamental castings for the restored façade in 1997.
