= Planning Magazine =

Monthly publication of the American Planning Association

Planning
- Categories: Trade magazine
- Frequency: 11 per year
- Founded: 1935
- Company: American Planning Association
- Country: United States
- Based in: Chicago, Illinois
- Language: English
- Website: www.planning.org/planning/
- ISSN: 0001-2610

Planning Magazine is a monthly publication of the American Planning Association. The headquarters is in Chicago. It offers news and analyses of events in planning (including suburban, rural, and small town planning, environmental planning, neighborhood revitalization, economic development, social planning, and urban design).
