= Peter Lyman =

American professor of information science

George Peter Lyman
- Born: September 13, 1940; San Francisco, California US
- Died: July 2, 2007 (aged 66); Berkeley, California, US
- Occupations: Librarian, Information science professor
- Spouse: Barrie Thorne

Academic background
- Education: Stanford University (B.A. 1962, Ph.D. 1973); University of California, Berkeley (M.A. 1963)
- Thesis: Marx's Use of Phenomenology in the Criticism of Politics, and as a Solution to the Problem of Ideology (1973)

Academic work
- Discipline: Library and information science
- Institutions: Michigan State University; University of Southern California; UC Berkeley School of Library and Information Studies

George Peter Lyman (September 13, 1940 – July 2, 2007) was an American professor of information science who taught at the University of California, Berkeley School of Information, and was well known in U.S. academia for his research on online information and his leadership in remaking university library systems for the digital era.

== Life ==
Lyman was a well-known figure in the fields of information and library science in his capacity as researcher and as university librarian for the University of California, Berkeley and the University of Southern California. He received his BA from Stanford University in Philosophy, his MA from Berkeley in Political Science, and his PhD in Political Science from Stanford. He taught Political Theory at Michigan State University, where he was a faculty member during the early years of James Madison College, a residential college with a public affairs focus; at Michigan State he was also the Assistant Director of Academic Computing. He joined the University of Southern California where he became Dean of the University Libraries. He left USC in 1994 to take the position of University Librarian at the University of California, Berkeley, with a simultaneous appointment in the School of Library and Information Studies (which shortly thereafter became the School of Information Management and Systems [SIMS], now the UC Berkeley School of Information). In 1998, he became a full-time Professor in SIMS, where he taught and conducted research until ailing health resulted in his retirement in 2006. He died in July 2007.

In 2005, Lyman became the director of the Digital Youth Project, formally known as "Kids' Informal Learning with Digital Media: An Ethnographic Investigation of Innovative Knowledge Cultures", a three-year collaborative project funded by the John D. and Catherine T. MacArthur Foundation. Carried out by researchers at University of Southern California and University of California, Berkeley, the project explores how kids use digital media in their everyday lives. Prior to that, he conducted a widely cited study tracking how much information is created each year, "How Much Information?"

Lyman also contributed to fields outside of information studies. One of his most reprinted articles is "The Fraternal Bond as Joking Relationship: A case study of the role of sexist jokes in male group bonding", an analysis of the role humor plays in men's relationships. He was also an active faculty member at UC Berkeley's Center for New Media.

The diversity and range of his academic interests were not only reflected in his publications but also in his teaching. While at UC Berkeley, he taught or co-taught courses in: Information Policy, Analysis of Information in Organizations, Copyright Law and Policy, New Media, and Qualitative Methods, one of his primary academic passions.

In addition to his teaching and research, Lyman worked as an advisor to a wide range of organizations. He was on the boards of SAGE Publications, EDUCOM, the Research Libraries Group, the Charles Babbage Institute, the Commission on Preservation and Access, the Council on Library and Information Resources, and the Internet Archive.

Lyman and his longtime spouse Dr. Barrie Thorne (professor of Gender and Women's Studies, and Sociology at the University of California, Berkeley) raised two children, Andrew Thorne-Lyman, a doctoral candidate in nutrition at the Harvard School of Public Health and Abigail Thorne-Lyman, the Director of the Center For Transit-Oriented Development at Reconnecting America. They also have three grandchildren.

== Publications ==
- "Liberal Education in Cyberia." Education and Democracy: Re-imagining Liberal Learning in America. New York: The College Board, 1997. pp. 299–319. A paper on the impact of information technology on pragmatic liberal education, commissioned by The College Board.
- "Is Using a Computer Like Driving a Car, Reading a Book, or solving a Problem? The Computer as Machine, Text and Culture." in Work and Technology in Higher Education, edited by Mark Shields (New Jersey: Lawrence Erlbaum Associates 1995). A paper on the links between computer work and the American tradition of invention and "tinkering." (see also shorter version: "Computing as Performance Art" Educom Review, Vol. 30, No. 4, July/August 1995.)
- "Digital Documents and the Future of the Academic Community." In Technology and Scholarly Communication. Edited by Quandt, Richard Emeric and Richard Ekman. University of California Press, 1999. (see also: Proceedings from the Conference on Scholarly Communication and Technology, University of California Press, 1997. Abstract and full text. A paper commissioned by the Mellon Foundation for a conference on Scholarly Publishing, concerning the implications of digital publishing for the academic sense of community).
- "How is the Medium the Message? Notes on the Design of Network Communication." Computer Networking and Scholarship in the 21st Century University. Edited by T. Harrison and T. Stephen. SUNY Press, .
- "What is a Digital Library? Technology, Intellectual Property and the Public Interest." Daedalus, Journal of the American Academy of Arts and Sciences: Book, Bricks, and Bytes. Fall 1996, Vol. 125, No. 4, pgs. 1-33.
- "Archiving Digital Cultural Artifacts: Organizing an Agenda for Action" by Peter Lyman and Brewster Kahle, Alexa Internet, for D-Lib Magazine.
- __ and Howard Besser. "Defining the Problem of Our Vanishing Memory: Background, Current Status, Models for Resolution." In Time and Bits: Managing Digital Continuity, edited by Margaret MacLean and Ben H. Davis. Los Angeles: Getty Information Institute and Getty Conservation Institute, 1998.
- "The UCC 2-B Debate and the Sociology of the Information Age." Berkeley Technology Law Journal.
- "Risk, tribe and lore: New Paths to Post-Baccalaureate Learning in Digital Libraries" (Aspen Institute Conference on Post-Baccalaureate Learning, November 7, 1998, co-sponsored by the University Continuing Education Association and the Council of Graduate Schools).
- "The Poetics of the Future: Information Highways, Virtual Communities and Digital Libraries." The Lazerow Lecture, School of Library and Information Sciences, UCLA. (November 18, 1998)
- "The Responsibilities of Universities in the New Information Environment," and "The Future of Scholarly Communication" by Peter Lyman and Stanley Chodorow, in The Mirage of Continuity: Reconfiguring Academic Information Resources for the 21st Century. CLIR and AAU: Washington D.C., 1998.
- "Designing Libraries to be Learning Communities: Toward an Ecology of Places for Learning." For the June 1998 meeting of UKOLN.
- "Archiving the World Wide Web." In Building a National Strategy for Preservation: Issues in Digital Media Archiving. Council on Library and Information Resources and the Library of Congress, April 2002.
- Looney, Michael and Peter Lyman. "Portals in Higher Education." EDUCAUSE, July/August 2000.
- Copyright and Fair Use in the Digital Age: Q & A with Peter Lyman, Educom Review, Vol. 30, No. 1, p32-35, Jan/Feb 1995.
- __ and Hal Varian. "The Democratization of Data." Harvard Business Review. Vol. 79, No. 1, p137-139, January 2001.
- __ and N. Wakeford. "Going into the (Virtual) Field." American Behavioral Scientist. Vol. 43, No. 3, p359-376. November/December 1999.
- "Access is the Killer Application." Journal of Academic Librarianship. Vol. 22, No. 5, p371-375. September 1996.
- "Invention, the Mother of Necessity - Archival Research in 2020." American Archivist. Vol. 57, No. 1, p114-125. Winter 1994.
- "The Politics of Anger - On Silence, Ressentiment, and Political Speech." Socialist Review. Vol. 57, p55-74. 1981.
- "A China Journal." Socialist Review. Vol. 54, p55-70. 1980.
- "The fraternal bond as a joking relationship. A case study of the role of sexist jokes in male group bonding", in Kimmel, M.S. (Eds), Changing Men. New Directions in Research on Men and Masculinity, SAGE Publications, Newbury Park, CA, pp. 148–63, 1987.

== See also ==
- Ethnography
- Digital media
