= Nichole Pinkard =

American computer scientist

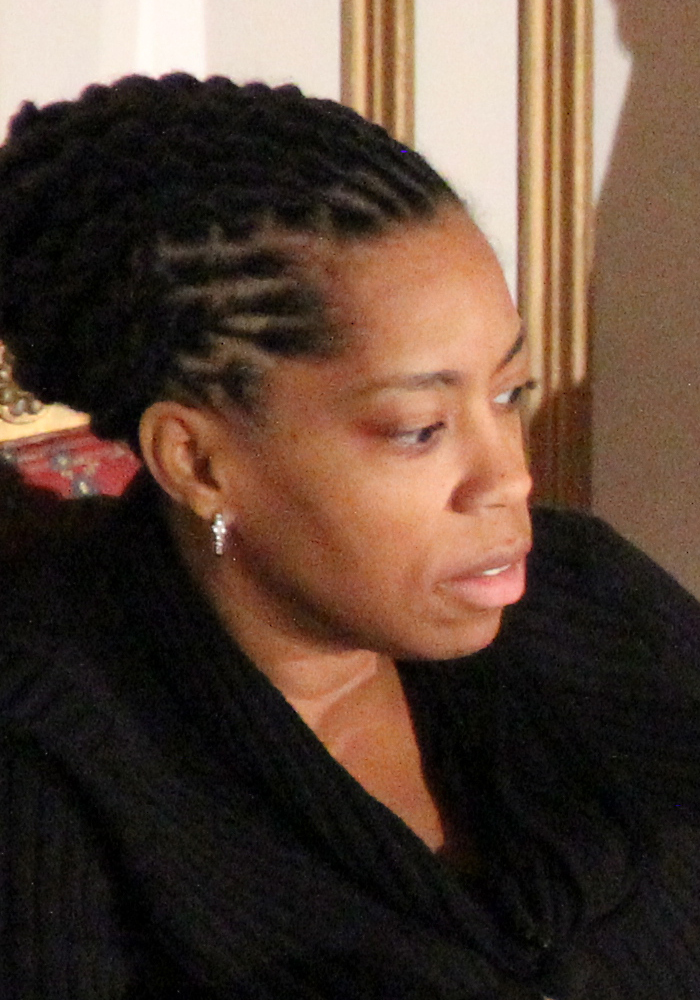
- Pinkard in 2014
- Education: Stanford University; Northwestern University
- Occupation: Computer scientist
- Known for: Founded the Digital Youth Network

Nichole Pinkard is an American computer scientist and the Alice Hamilton Professor of Learning Sciences and faculty director of the Office of Community Education Partnerships (OCEP) in the School of Education and Social Policy at Northwestern. She is helping lead a collaboration with Apple and the Chicago Public School system to teach computer programming to teachers.

She was formerly an associate professor of computing and digital media at DePaul University, and the co-founder of the Digital Youth Network with Akili Lee, a "hybrid digital literacy program." She is involved with multiple projects related to digital learning.

Pinkard has served as the Director of Innovation for the University of Chicago's Urban Education Institute (UEI), and as chief technology officer and director of the Information Infrastructure System (IIS) project at the Center for Urban School Improvement (USI) at the University of Chicago. In 2010, she received the Common Sense Media Award for Outstanding Commitment to Creativity and Youth.

== Education ==
Pinkard holds a B.S. in Computer Science from Stanford University, an M.S. in Computer Science from Northwestern University, and a Ph.D. in Learning Sciences from Northwestern University.

== Career ==
Pinkard is an associate professor in the School of Education and Social Policy at Northwestern University. She is also the faculty director of the Office Community Education Partnership. Previously, Pinkard was an associate professor at DePaul University in the College of Computing and Digital Media. Her research is focused on the design and use of pedagogical-based social networks, new media literacy learning outcomes, ecological models of learning and developing pathways for urban youth.

== Digital Youth Network ==
Pinkard founded the Digital Youth Network (DYN) in 2006, at the University of Chicago's Urban Education Institute. The project is designed to support "organizations, educators and researchers in learning best practices to help develop our youths’ technical, creative, and analytical skills." The DYN model begins with sixth to eighth-grade education and focuses on mandatory in-school media arts classes and optional after-school programs. The model is designed to expose youth to multi-media outlets and forms of expression. A high school program follows, which is designed to help students to develop independent strengths.

The program has partnered with several schools in Chicago, with several other Chicago-area organizations. In 2010, DYN partnered with LISC/Chicago and the Smart Communities Program to develop a program called Broadband Technology Opportunity Program (B-TOP), which focused on expanding DYN into new communities including Auburn-Gresham, Chicago Lawn, Englewood, Pilsen, and Humboldt Park.

DYN has received grants from the John D. and Catherine T. MacArthur Foundation and the Bill and Melinda Gates Foundation.

== Other projects ==
Pinkard was also a co-founder of YOUmedia, a public learning space for teens that immerses students in a context of traditional media to produce new media artifacts like games, videos, and virtual worlds. YOUmedia began as a partnership between the Chicago Public Library and the MacArthur Foundation and has since expanded to a country-wide network of YOUmedia Learning Labs. Teens engaging with YOUmedia can access thousands of books and a variety of media creation tools to help them build their digital media skills.

In April 2010, Pinkard co-founded RemixWorld along with Robert Chang. RemixWorld is a privately held company emerging from work developed at the Digital Youth Network and supported by the MacArthur Foundation’s Digital Media and Learning Initiative. It is a cloud-based social learning network for primary and secondary education, which seeks to safely and securely connect children and adolescents with curriculum, extended learning and mentorship opportunities.

Pinkard has also worked with the Joan Ganz Cooney Center, an independent research and innovation lab that catalyzes and supports research and investment in digital media technologies to advance children’s learning.
