= Donald Olson =

Donald Olson may refer to:

- Donny Olson, member of the Alaska Senate
- Donald Olson (astronomer), astrophysicist and forensic astronomer

== See also ==
- Donald Olsen, American architect
- Donald P. Olsen, American violinist, educator and painter
