= UC Berkeley College of Environmental Design =

College of the University of California, Berkeley

University of California, Berkeley College of Environmental Design
- Type: Public
- Established: 1959; 67 years ago
- Parent institution: University of California, Berkeley
- Location: Berkeley, California, United States
- Website: ced.berkeley.edu

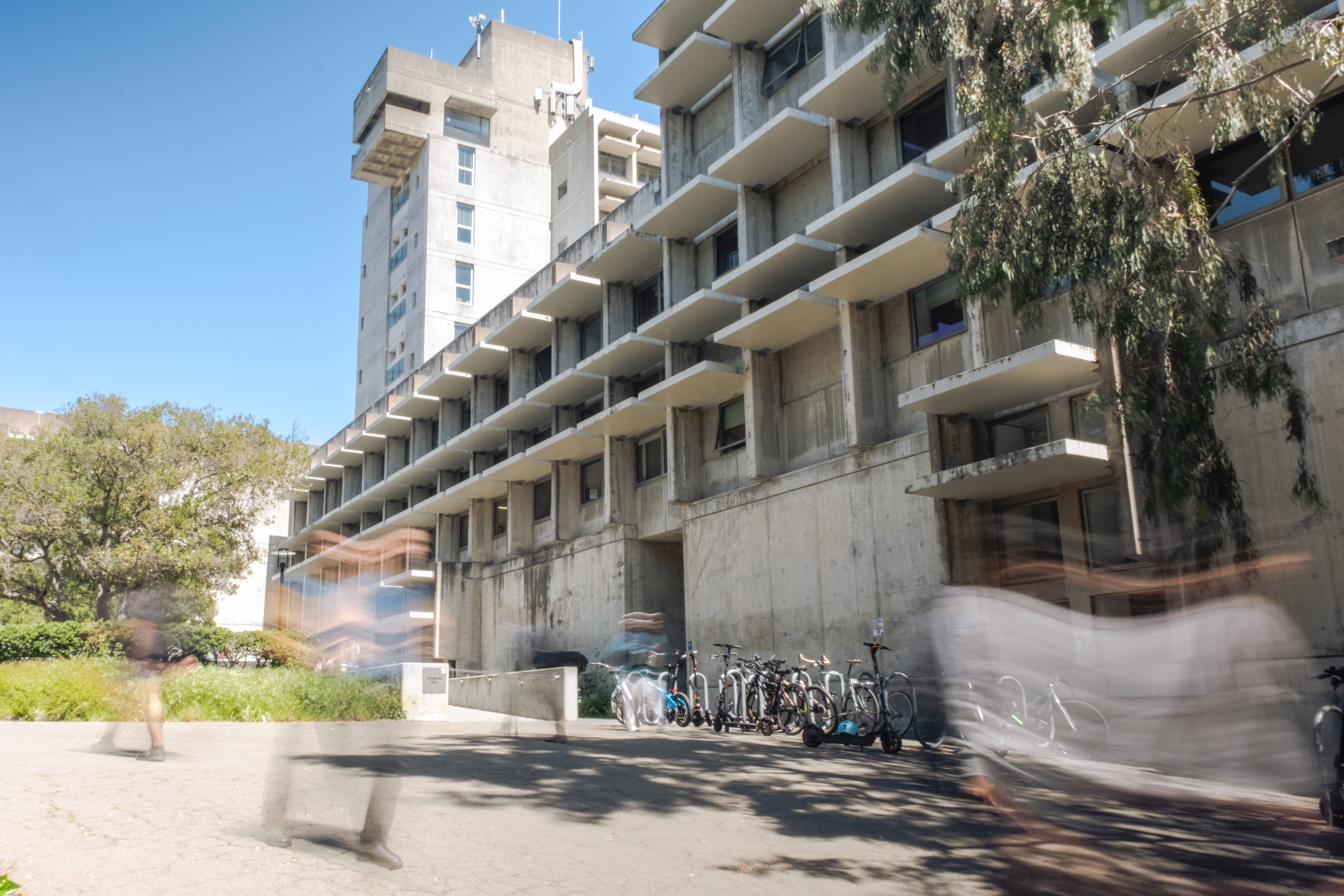
Bauer Wurster Hall, UC Berkeley

The UC Berkeley College of Environmental Design, also known as CED, is one of 15 schools and colleges at the University of California, Berkeley. The college is housed in Bauer Wurster Hall at the southeast corner of the main UC Berkeley campus. It includes four departments: the Department of Architecture, the Department of City & Regional Planning, the Department of Landscape Architecture & Environmental Planning, and the Institute of Urban & Regional Development. In the QS World University Rankings, CED ranks as the top public university in the United States for the study of architecture and the built environment.

== History ==
The College of Environmental Design was founded in 1959, when Dean William W. Wurster brought together four existing campus units to create a multidisciplinary approach to the built environment: the School of Architecture (founded 1903 by John Galen Howard), the School of Landscape Architecture (founded 1913 by John William Gregg), the Department of City Planning (founded 1948), and the Department of Decorative Arts. Wurster Hall, designed by CED faculty Joseph Esherick, Vernon DeMars, and Donald Olsen to house the new college, opened in 1964; the building was renamed Bauer Wurster Hall in 2020 after archival documentation came to light revealing that the building name was intended to recognize both William W. Wurster and Catherine Bauer Wurster, associate dean of the college, for their contributions to the founding of CED.

=== History of the Department of Architecture ===
The earliest days of architectural education at UC Berkeley, founded as California’s land grant college in 1868, is closely associated with Bernard Maybeck (1862–1957), who taught drawing from 1894 to 1903. Among Maybeck’s students – he held informal architecture tutorials at his home in addition to teaching at the college – were Julia Morgan, who became the first woman accepted into the architecture course at the Ecole des Beaux-Arts in Paris in 1898, and John Galen Howard, who later became the campus architect and went on to found the department of architecture in 1903. This was the first architecture school to be established in the western United States and only the seventh in the nation.

Like other architecture schools in the United States, the program was founded on the model of the Ecole des Beaux-Arts in Paris, a legacy that persisted until the middle of the 20th century. Howard served as head until 1927, when his protege Warren Perry (class of 1907) took the helm and retained Howard’s devotion to the Beaux-Arts. In the first few years, classes were held in downtown Berkeley in Howard’s office. From 1906, the architecture school was housed in Northgate Hall, the “Ark,” an example of First Bay Tradition Architecture (now home to the UC Berkeley Graduate School of Journalism).

Many of the architects who shaped the built environment of the Bay Area following the 1906 earthquake and fire trained here under Howard, including John Hudson Thomas, Henry Gutterson, and the designers of San Francisco City Hall and the Golden Gate Bridge.

At midcentury, in response to student demands, the curriculum began to modernize. Erich Mendelsohn, a European modernist who had fled Europe, set up his practice in San Francisco and taught at Berkeley from 1941 until his death in 1953. In 1950, alum William Wurster (class of 1919), co-founder of the firm Wurster, Bernardi, and Emmons, was lured away from MIT to lead the school. He established the College of Environmental Design In 1959 and served as dean until his retirement in 1963.

== Undergraduate programs ==
- Bachelor of Arts, Architecture
- Bachelor of Arts, Landscape Architecture
- Bachelor of Arts, Sustainable Environmental Design
- Bachelor of Arts, Urban Studies

== Graduate programs ==
- Master of Architecture
- Master of Design
- Master of Urban Design
- Master of City Planning
- Master of Landscape Architecture
- Master of Real Estate Development and Design
- Master of Science, Architecture
- Master of Advanced Architectural Design
- Ph.D., Architecture
- Ph.D., City and Regional Planning
- Ph.D., Landscape Architecture and Environmental Planning

== Faculty and alumni ==
=== Deans of the College of Environmental Design ===
- 2021–2026: Renee Chow, Dean
- 2020–2021: Vishaan Chakrabarti, Dean
- 2019–2020: Renee Chow, Acting Dean
- 2009–2019: Jennifer Wolch, Dean
- 2008–2009: Sam Davis, Interim Dean
- 1996–2008: Harrison Fraker, Dean
- 1988–1996: Roger Montgomery, Dean
- 1976–1988: Richard Bender, Dean
- 1967–1976: William Wheaton, Dean
- 1966: John E. Burchard, Acting Dean
- 1963–1966: Martin Meyerson, Dean
- 1959–1963: William W. Wurster, Dean

=== Notable alumni ===
In 1998, CED established the Distinguished Alumni Award to honor alums who have exhibited outstanding public service, in its broadest sense, throughout their careers. Recipients include: David Baker, Fred Blackwell, Kofi Bonner, John Cary, Yung Ho Chang, Clare Cooper Marcus, Dana Cuff, Charles M. Davis, Vernon DeMars, Garrett Eckbo, Lee Ehmke, Frederic C. Girot, Hans Hollein, Ray Kappe, Rodolfo Machado, Gerald M. McCue, Eric Owen Moss, Michael R. Painter, Robert Royston, Stanley Saitowitz, Frederic D. Schwartz, Jorge Silvetti, William K. Stout, Peter Walker, Lewis Watts, and Gwendolyn Wright.

==== Other notable alumni include ====
- Bruce Appleyard
- Mai Kitazawa Arbegast, landscape architect
- Alice Ross Carey
- Vishaan Chakrabarti, architect
- Thomas Church, landscape architect
- Edward Cullinan, 2008 recipient of the RIBA Royal Gold Medal
- Charles M. Eastman, pioneer of CAD and building information modeling systems for architecture.
- Henry Gutterson
- Walter Hood, landscape designer
- Rossana Hu, architect
- Norman Jaffe
- Jim Jennings, architect
- Wes Jones, architect
- Ridwan Kamil, 15th Governor of West Java, Indonesia
- G. Albert Lansburgh
- Roger Lee (1920–1981), architect

• Peter Marcuse

- Gertrude Comfort Morrow
- Irving Morrow, designer of the Golden Gate Bridge
- Robert Murase, landscape architect
- Vladimir Ossipoff
- Emily Pilloton-Lam, founder, Girls Garage
- Margaret Read, architect
- Ananya Roy

• Mario Schjetnan

- Barbara Stauffacher Solomon
- Edwin Lewis Snyder
- Marilyn Jordan Taylor, chairman of Skidmore, Owings & Merrill and dean of the University of Pennsylvania School of Design
- Bing Thom
- John Hudson Thomas
- Alan Wanzenberg
- Harvey Wiley Corbett
- Michael Woo, former dean of the Cal Poly Pomona College of Environmental Design, and former Los Angeles planning commissioner
- William Wurster, architect, founding dean of the College of Environmental Design, UC Berkeley

=== Notable current faculty ===
Notable current faculty include:

- Renee Chow
- Kristina Hill
- Lisa Iwamoto
- Ben Metcalf
- Ronald Rael
- Neyran Turan

=== Notable former faculty ===
- James Ackerman
- Nezar AlSayyad
- Christopher Alexander, developer of the Pattern Language
- Donald Appleyard
- Catherine Bauer Wurster
- Charles Benton
- Ed Blakely
- Ernest Born
- Jean-Paul Bourdier
- Denise Scott Brown, partner in Venturi, Scott Brown and Associates
- Gary Brown
- Robert Cervero
- Vishaan Chakrabarti
- Raveevarn Choksombatchai
- Mary Comerio
- Margaret Crawford
- Vernon DeMars
- Neil Denari
- Penny Dhaemers
- Anthony Dubovsky
- Charles Eames
- Garrett Eckbo
- Joseph Esherick, 1989 recipient of the AIA Gold Medal
- Norma Evenson
- Richard Fernau
- Howard Friedman
- Paul Groth
- Sir Peter Hall
- Sami Hassid
- Walter J. Hood
- John Galen Howard, founder of the Department of Architecture
- Sara Ishikawa
- Allan Jacobs
- Spiro Kostof
- Lars Lerup
- Roslyn Lindheim
- Donn Logan
- Donlyn Lyndon
- Aaron Marcus, graphic designer
- Clare Cooper Marcus
- Richard L. Meier, sustainable planning expert
- Bernard Maybeck
- Mike Martin
- Erich Mendelsohn
- Roger Montgomery
- Charles Moore, 1992 recipient of the AIA Gold Medal
- Donald Olsen
- Richard Peters
- James Prestini
- Jean-Pierre Protzen
- Amos Rapoport
- Horst Rittel
- Stanley Saitowitz
- Geraldine Knight Scott
- Daniel Solomon
- Claude Stoller
- Jill Stoner
- Stephen Tobriner
- Marc Treib
- Dell Upton
- Sim Van der Ryn
- Francis Violich
- William Wurster, 1969 recipient of the AIA Gold Medal

== Affiliated research centers ==
- Terner Center for Housing Innovation
- Center for the Built Environment
- Center for Environmental Design Research
- Center for Cities + Schools
