= Michael Painter =

American architect

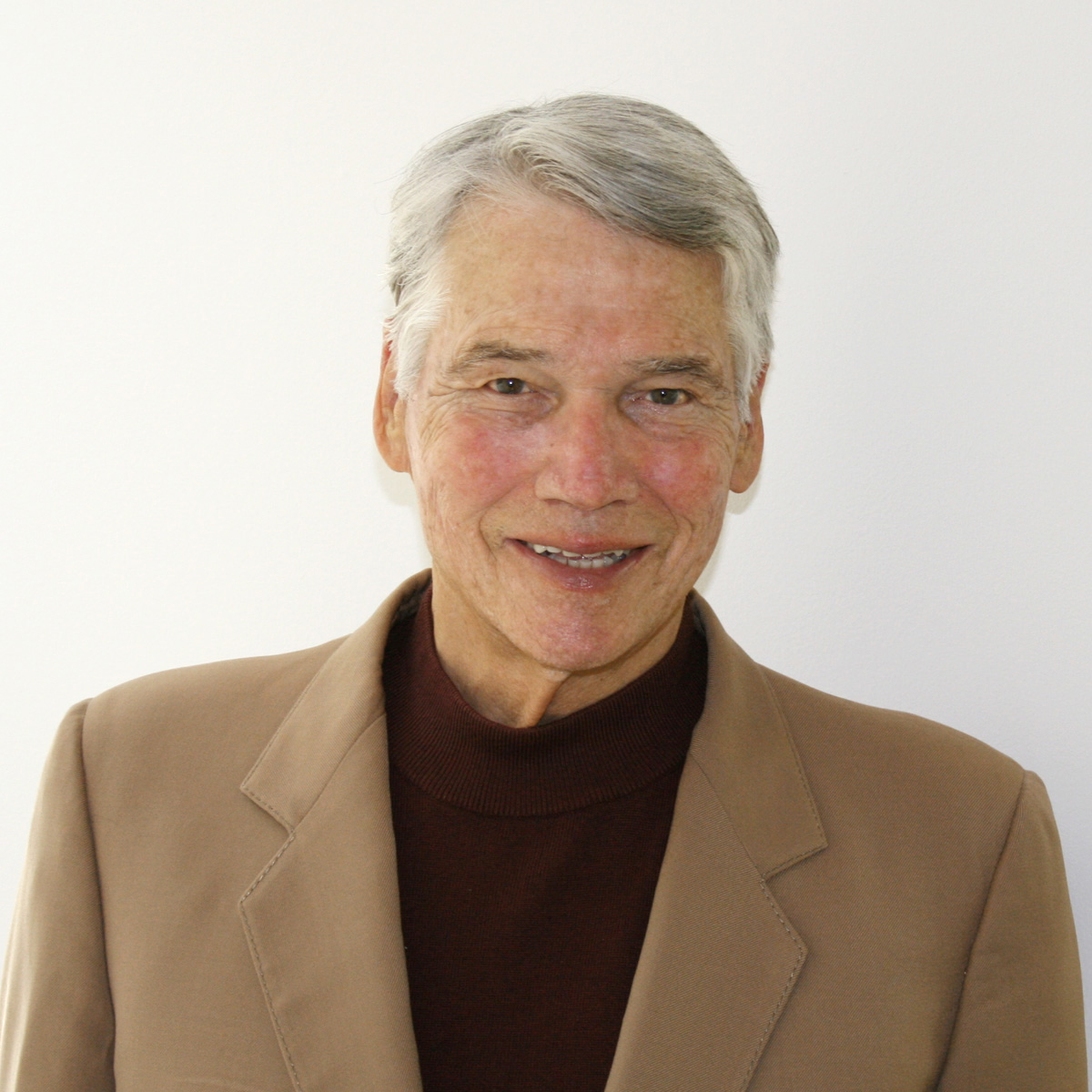
Michael Painter

Michael Painter (1935 - 2018) was an American landscape architect and urban designer based in San Francisco, California. He was a fellow of the American Society of Landscape Architects. His most notable project is the Presidio Parkway, a roadway through the Presidio National Park from the Golden Gate Bridge. Other notable projects include the John F. Kennedy Grave Site at Arlington National Cemetery, the Great Highway/Ocean Beach Re-Construction in San Francisco, Children's Playground in Golden Gate Park, the College of San Mateo, Twin Peaks overlook in San Francisco, Hunter's Point Hilltop Park in San Francisco, AT&T Administrative Center in San Ramon, Lafayette Park and the Blair House in Washington D.C., Aquatic Park in Berkeley, Hennepin Center in Minneapolis, State Compensation Insurance Fund in San Francisco, Genentech Campus in South San Francisco, the HP Corporate Headquarters in Palo Alto, and the Asilomar Conference Center in Monterey.

== Early and personal life ==
Michael Painter was born in Pasadena, California, son of Lillias Armour Painter and John Guy Painter. As a child during World War II, he tended the home “Victory garden,” which included vegetables and ornamental plants. At twelve years old he began working in the summer as the assistant of a Mr. Poland, a landscape maintenance person working in Pasadena and Altadena residential gardens. Mr. Poland introduced the idea of becoming a landscape architect. Painter's first design project was a new garden for his parents' home. Jacques Hahn and Chuck Hoffman of the firm Hahn and Hoffman, Painter's summer employers between 1950 and 1955, suggested the Landscape Architecture program at the University of California, Berkeley.

Michael Painter married Margaret Susan Collins in 1959. They had met in 1955 at Laguna Beach, California. After finishing college, the two married and moved to San Francisco. Their first home was in Lucas Valley, Marin County, north of San Francisco. In 1964 they moved to a home they had bought in Mill Valley, California, where Painter lived the rest of his life. Daughter Melissa Painter was born in 1968 and son Joshua Painter was born in 1971. Designing new landscape plans for his home and doing the construction at the Mill Valley residence was a lifelong hobby.

== Career ==
While attending the University of California, Berkeley’s College of Environmental Design, his instructor Mai Arbegast recommended Painter to the Lawrence Halprin office as a student intern, where he worked for two years starting in 1956. At the Halprin firm, Painter was involved with projects such as the Stanford Shopping Center, the consulate in Fukuoka Japan, enhancements to UC Berkeley and Davis campuses, and the Baptist Seminary in Mill Valley, California. On the Baptist Seminary project he served as project manager, interacting with the project architects, John Carl Warnecke and Associates.

In 1958, Painter jointed the Warnecke firm to start a landscape architecture section. There he worked on projects such as the Del Monte Shopping Center, Asilomar, the Hawaiian State Capitol, and the UC Santa Cruz master plan. In 1961 he was made an associate of the firm, and in 1964, a partner. He left briefly to work with landscape architect Peter Walker, then returned to the Warnecke firm.

In 1961 Painter began working with the Warnecke Washington, D. C. office on projects such as the Kennedy gravesite in Arlington National Cemetery, Lafayette Park, the Georgetown Library, the Blair House garden, and the master plan for the Naval Academy campus at Annapolis. Painter created the design direction of the Kennedy gravesite project.

In 1965, Warnecke proposed that Painter attend Harvard University to study urban design. Painter continued to manage the landscape team during the year long Masters program at Harvard. Following graduation, Painter spent the summer in Washington D.C. to refine the Kennedy Grave design and supervise construction. Bunny Mellon, a close friend of Jacqueline Kennedy, helped with the design and consulted on plant materials.

After returning to San Francisco, Painter worked on projects such as the Kaiser Center for Technology, the Hilton Hotel in Tahiti, and the Monterey Custom House redevelopment. In 1969 he left the Warnecke firm to establish Michael Painter & Associates. He continued to work with the Warnecke firm on projects such as the Pasadena Center as well as with other architects. In 1984 the firm name was changed to MPA Design.

Painter's interest in large, complex projects, his exposure to city planning with Vernon DeMars at Berkeley, as well as his graduate studies at Harvard, set the direction for his firm’s work on civic and educational projects, corporate campuses, parks, and playgrounds. Painter learned from elementary school teachers about the possibility of designing play structures that could address children's learning differences. He worked closely with the San Francisco Recreation and Parks Department on a number of projects. Another civic project, the redesign of San Francisco’s Great Highway/Ocean Beach, was begun in 1977 and was completed in 1988.

Painter served on the San Francisco Architectural Heritage Board, the San Francisco Planning and Urban Research Advisory Committee (SPUR), San Francisco's Friends of Recreation and Parks, the San Francisco Landscape Garden Show, the Exploratorium science museum board, and the Presidio Historical Association. He was named a Fellow of the American Society of Landscape Architects in 1987. In 2010 was given the Distinguished Alumnus Award from the College of Environmental Design, UC Berkeley. Painter completed over 850 projects and received more than 60 awards over the course of his career.

== Presidio Parkway Project ==
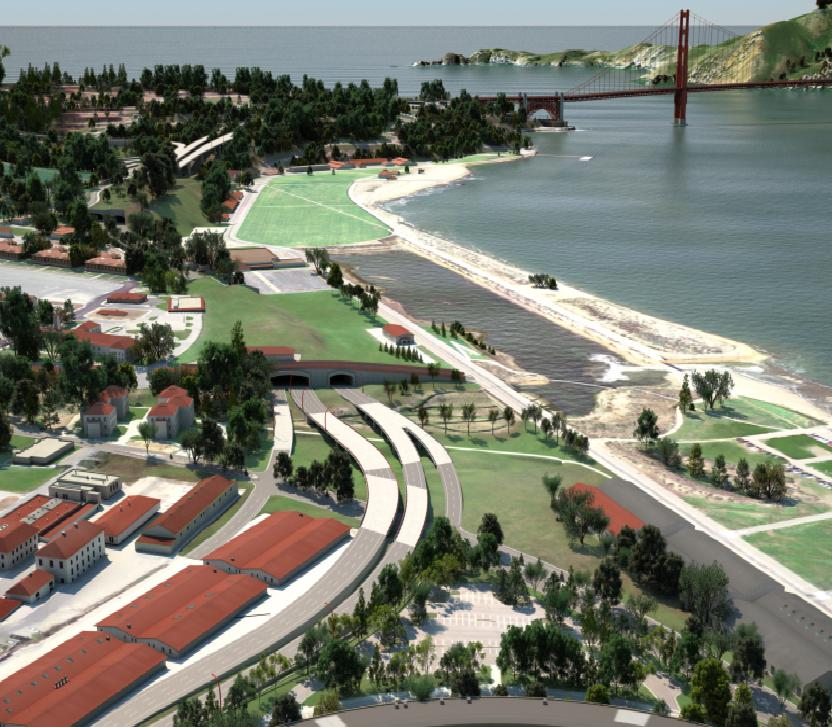
Presidio Parkway overview

In 1988, at the Exploratorium science museum, then at the Palace of Fine Arts located at the eastern end of Doyle Drive, Painter climbed the rooftop to assess possibilities for additional museum parking. While looking at the view of the way the Marina district was connected to the Presidio in a semi-circular arc, he imagined his design for the drive where the view would be visible by eliminating the elevated viaduct, lowering the roadway, and creating a series of tunnels that would run up the north spine of the Presidio. The tunnel-top solution would enable pedestrian or bicycle access from the Presidio Main Post to Cavalry Hill, the National Cemetery, and Crissy Field. It would be less costly than replacing the existing viaduct.

Painter presented the plan in a 1992 meeting of the Doyle Drive Task Force. Painter proposed rejecting existing designs for the bridge-and-tunnel scheme. The plan provided a solution to the existing issues with the Doyle Drive approaches to the Golden Gate Bridge and provides space for the new Tunnel Top Park.

Painter created the initial design in the early 1990s without pay. Later he became a leader of the project team and was listed as the architect on its environmental impact report. Construction started in 2008 and the Presidio Parkway was opened in 2015. A film "A Parkway for the People" commemorates the project.

== Notable Awards ==
Presidio Parkway

Community Service Award, AIA

San Francisco Merit Award, ASLA, Northern California

Certificate of Recognition, California State Assembly

Grave Site of President John F. Kennedy, Arlington, Virginia

Honor Award, ASLA, National

Great Highway/Ocean Beach Reconstruction, San Francisco

Honor Award, ASLA, National

Hennepin County Government Center, Minneapolis

Merit Award, ASLA, National

Twin Peaks: Vista Point Overlook, San Francisco

Merit Award, ASLA, Northern California Chapter

Pacific Bell Administrative Center, San Ramon

Award of Excellence, Urban Land Institute

Honor Award, ASLA, Northern California Chapter

Merit Award, ASLA, National

General Electric A.P.E.D. Headquarters Building, San Jose

Honor Award, ASLA, National

Hewlett Packard, Cupertino

Merit Award, ASLA, National

Asilomar Conference Center, Pacific Grove

Honor Award, ASLA, National

Blair House Garden, Washington, D.C.

Merit Award, ASLA, National

Lafayette Park, Washington D.C.

Merit Award, American Society of Landscape Architects

Mary B. Connolly Children’s Playground, Golden Gate Park, San Francisco

Honor Award, ASLA, National
