= Alice Ross Carey =

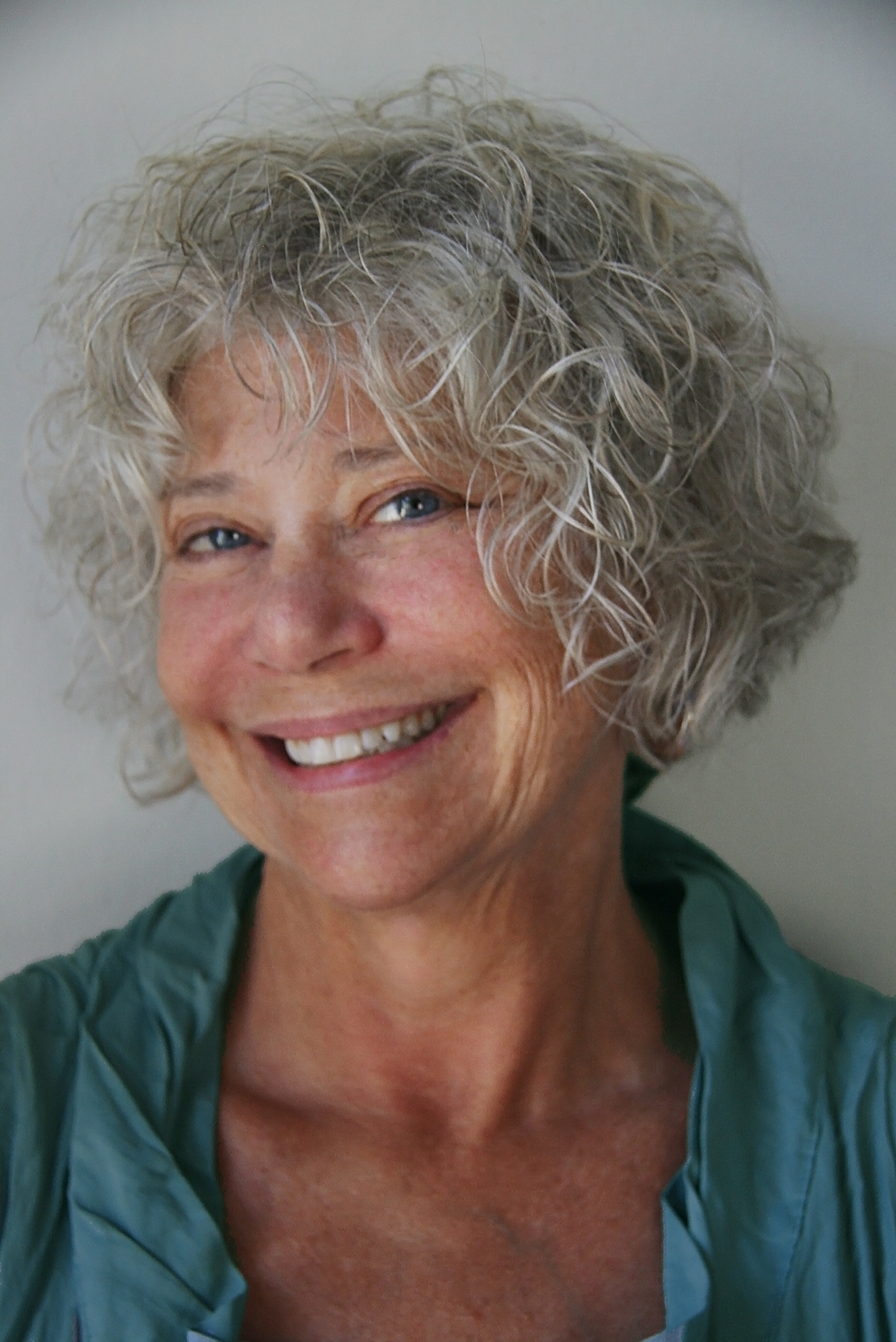
- Born: November 10, 1948; Brooklyn, New York
- Died: July 27, 2013 (aged 64)
- Education: College of Environmental Design
- Occupation: Architect
- Practice: Carey & Co.
- Projects: Jordan Hall at Stanford University; San Francisco’s Fairmont Hotel; San Francisco City Hall; San Francisco War Memorial Opera House; Sunol Water Temple; San Francisco Palace of Fine Arts; Marin County Civic Center

Alice Ross Carey (November 10, 1948 – July 27, 2013) was an American preservation architect, advocate, and early practitioner of historic preservation, restoration, and reuse.

== Early life ==
Alice Ross Carey was born in Brooklyn, New York, and raised in Toledo, Ohio. She received a Bachelor of Fine Arts from the University of Colorado. Carey worked as a carpenter and had her own small construction firm before completing a master's degree in architecture at the University of California, Berkeley in 1976.

== Career ==
Following graduation, Carey worked for the firms Esherick, Homsey Dodge & Davis (EHDD) and Whisler/Patri. While at EHDD, she became interested in the Bay Region Style of architecture and its architects Joseph Esherick, William Wurster, Charles Moore and William Turnbull Jr. Inspired, in 1983 she founded one of the first woman-owned architectural practices specializing in historic preservation in the United States: Carey & Co. As a result of her expertise, she was named to San Francisco’s Landmarks Preservation Advisory Board by 1988. After the 1989 Loma Prieta earthquake, her firm managed the preservation of several San Francisco historically significant civic buildings, including City Hall and the War Memorial Opera House. Her work on these projects earned Carey & Co. nearly three dozen state and national awards. During her career, Carey worked on restoring countless buildings, including Jordan Hall at Stanford University, San Francisco’s Fairmont Hotel, Oakland City Hall, Berkeley City Hall, Sunol Water Temple, San Francisco Palace of Fine Arts, and the Marin County Civic Center. She was a founding member of the Friends of Terra Cotta and on the Boards of several organizations including the Association of Advocates for Preservation, San Francisco Heritage, and the Environmental Design Archives at U.C. Berkeley.

== Legacy ==
Carey was a champion in the preservation community and advocated for the use of historic resources. Throughout her career, she fought to preserve countless buildings, including the New Mission Theater, the Fairmont Hotel Tonga Room, and the Metropolitan Club at 640 Sutter Street, all in San Francisco. She received a California Governor's Historic Preservation Awards posthumously in 2013 for her dedication to and work in the field of historic preservation.

== Archives ==
The Alice Carey/Carey & Company Records is held by the Environment Design Archives at the University of California, Berkeley.
