= Joseph Esherick (architect) =

American architect (1914–1998)

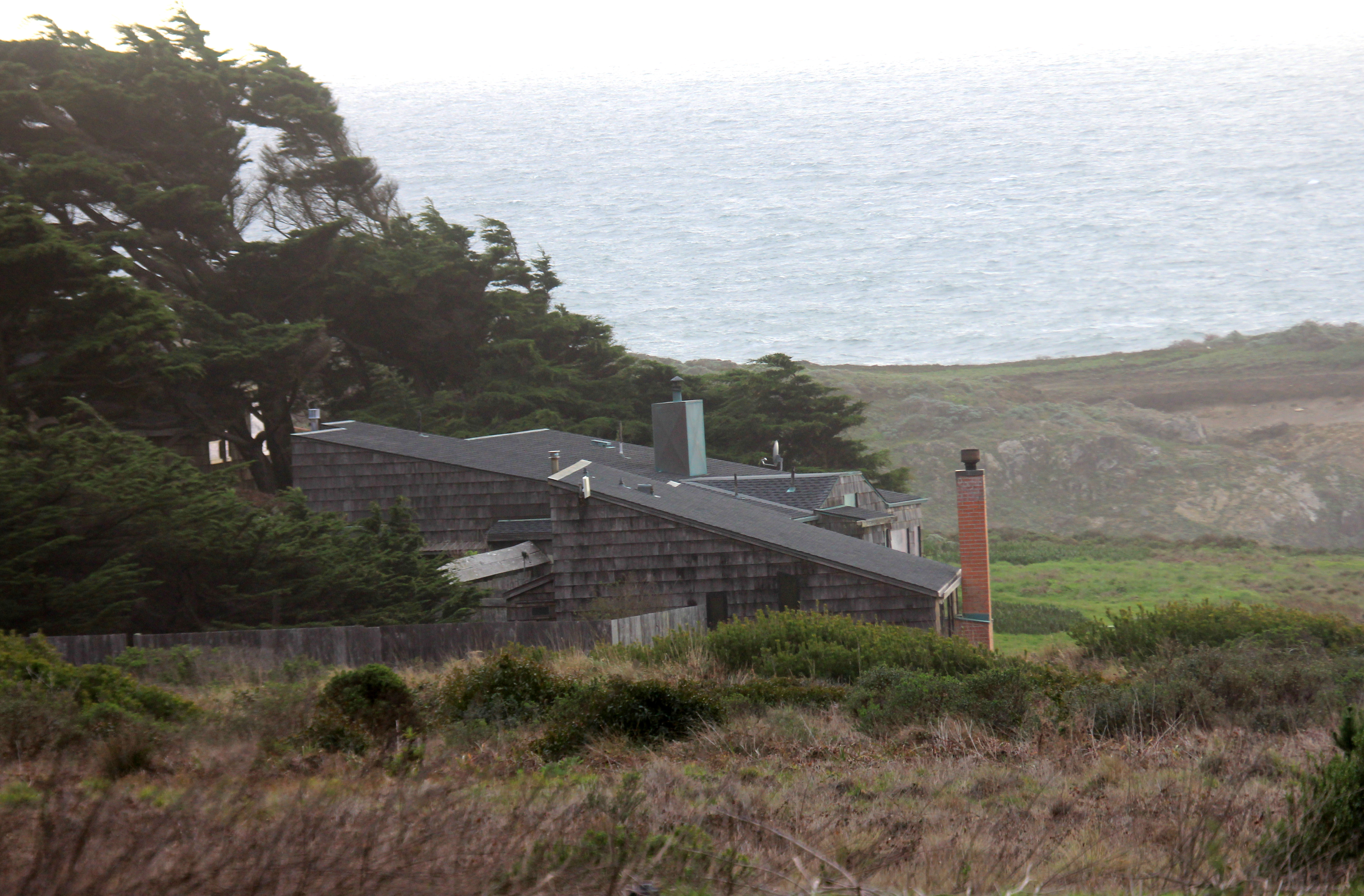
Escherick Sea Ranch house (1966) looking west from street.

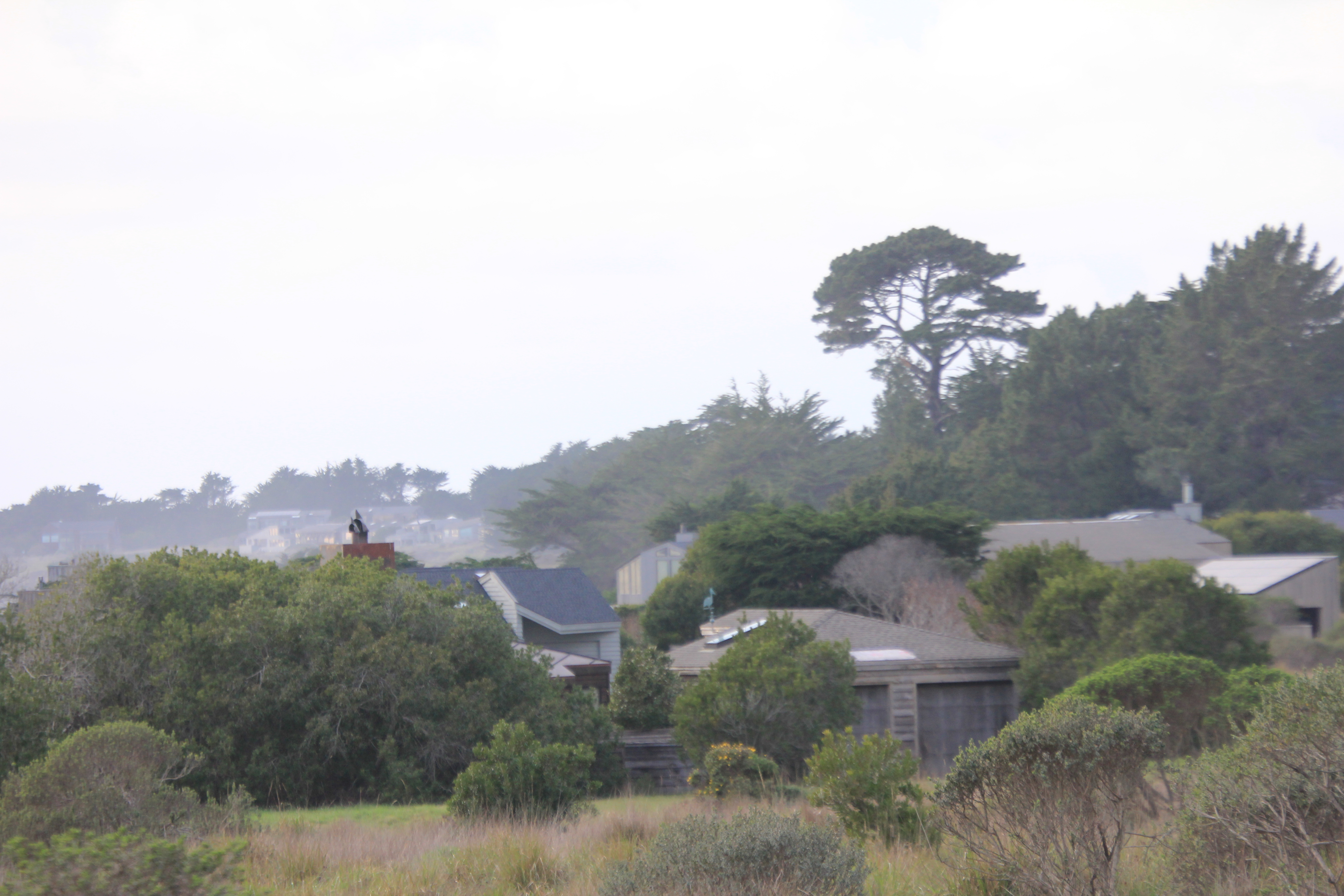
View of Esherick Sea Ranch house (1966) from the street looking northwest.

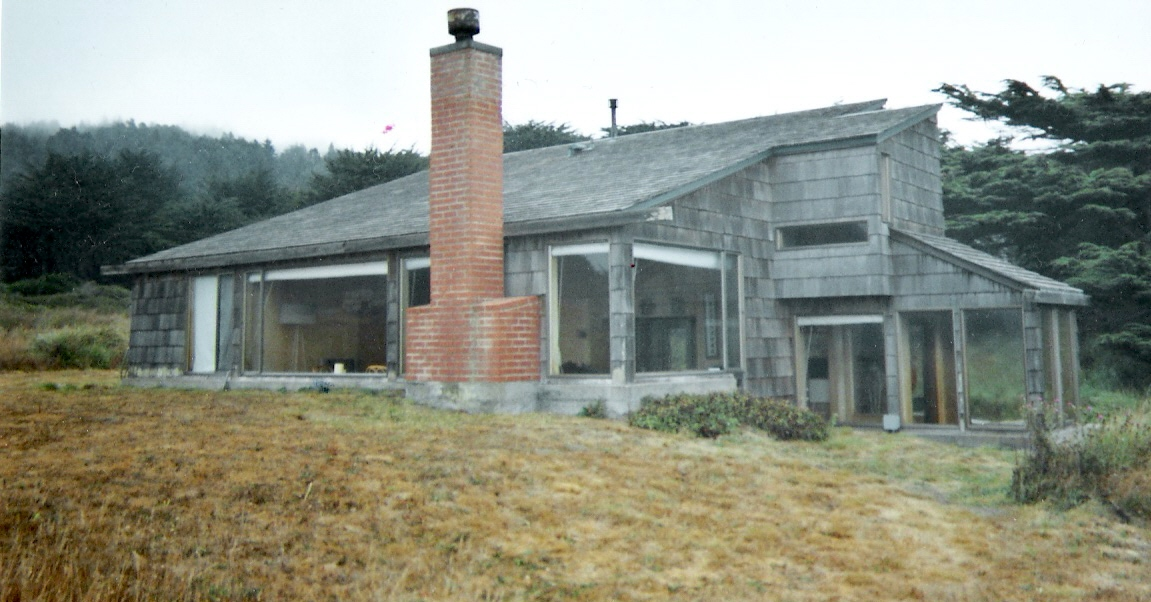
Sea Ranch house designed, and previously owned by Joseph Esherick, 1966.

Joseph Esherick (December 28, 1914 – December 17, 1998) was an American architect. He is known for his work in Sea Ranch, California and in the San Francisco Bay Area.

== Architectural career ==
Joseph Esherick was born on December 28, 1914, in Philadelphia, Pennsylvania. He graduated from the University of Pennsylvania in 1937 with a bachelor's degree in architecture.

Esherick worked for San Francisco Bay Area architect Gardner Dailey, and, about 1950, began his own practice in the San Francisco Bay Area. He taught at the University of California, Berkeley for many years. Esherick was awarded the AIA Gold Medal in 1989. Following in the tradition of Bay Area architects such as Bernard Maybeck and William Wurster, Esherick designed hundreds of houses, emphasizing regional traditions, site requirements, and user needs.

In 1938, Esherick married architect Rebecca Wood, whom he knew from Pennsylvania. About ten years later Rebecca designed their own home in Kent Woodlands with Joe consulting. The style of the house with a huge gabled roof and large glass walls is stunningly modern. In 1946, Rebecca earned her architectural license and worked for her husband on a variety of projects while raising their three children. By 1951, the couple divorced.

In 1959, Esherick was the co-founder, along with William Wurster and Vernon DeMars, of Berkeley's influential College of Environmental Design (CED). The CED encompassed disciplines of architecture, landscape architecture, environmental planning and city planning, and served as a nexus for figures like Christopher Alexander, Catherine Bauer, Galen Cranz, Donlyn Lyndon, Roger Montgomery, Charles Moore, and William Wilson Wurster.

In May 1962, Esherick visited the HfG Ulm as a visiting professor, where he taught Statistics and Operations Research, working primarily with Horst Rittel. This visit established his connection to Rittel, who would leave HfG Ulm the following year (1963) for Berkeley's College of Environmental Design.

In 1972, Esherick reorganized his office, turning away from houses to more commercial and academic work, with three longtime associates George Homsey, Peter Dodge and Chuck Davis to form Esherick Homsey Dodge & Davis, the winner of the 1986 Architecture Firm Award. The firm continues today as EHDD Architecture. In 1976, Esherick was elected into the National Academy of Design as an Associate member, and became a full Academician in 1990.

Esherick was the nephew of American sculptor Wharton Esherick.

== Work ==
- Hubbard House, Dover, Massachusetts, 1957
- House at Kentwoodlands, Kent Woodlands, California, 1957
- Hubbard at end of Spring Road, Ross, California, April 5, 1959
- Cary House, Mill Valley, California, 1960
- Harold E. Jones Child Study Center, at University of California, Berkeley, 1960
- Bermak House, Oakland, California, 1963, with architect Peter Dodge
- Six Sea Ranch Demonstration Houses (now called The Hedgerow Homes) (in collaboration with landscape architect Lawrence Halprin, three small scale Demonstration houses called "Mini-Mods", as well as other private residences at The Sea Ranch Sonoma County, California, 1967
- The Cannery, San Francisco, California, 1968
- Mountain House (aka. Roscoe House) Alamo, California, 1972
- Garfield School, San Francisco, California, 1981
- Flora Lamson Hewlett Library, Graduate Theological Union, Berkeley, California, 1981
- Silver Lake Lodge, Deer Valley, Utah, 1982
- Monterey Bay Aquarium, Monterey, California, 1984
- Hermitage Condominiums, San Francisco, California, 1984
- McGuire house, 268 Seadrift Road, Stinson Beach, California, 1987
- Henry's Fork Lodge, Island Park, Idaho, 1991
- Aquarium of the Pacific, Long Beach, California, 1998
- Tenderloin Community School, San Francisco, California, 1999
