= SPUR (San Francisco organization) =

Public policy organization in San Francisco, California, US

Coordinates: 37°47′14″N 122°24′04″W

- Formation: 1910; 116 years ago
- Key people: Sean Elsbernd (CEO); Lydia Tan (board chair)
- Revenue: $7.8 million (2019-20)
- Website: https://www.spur.org

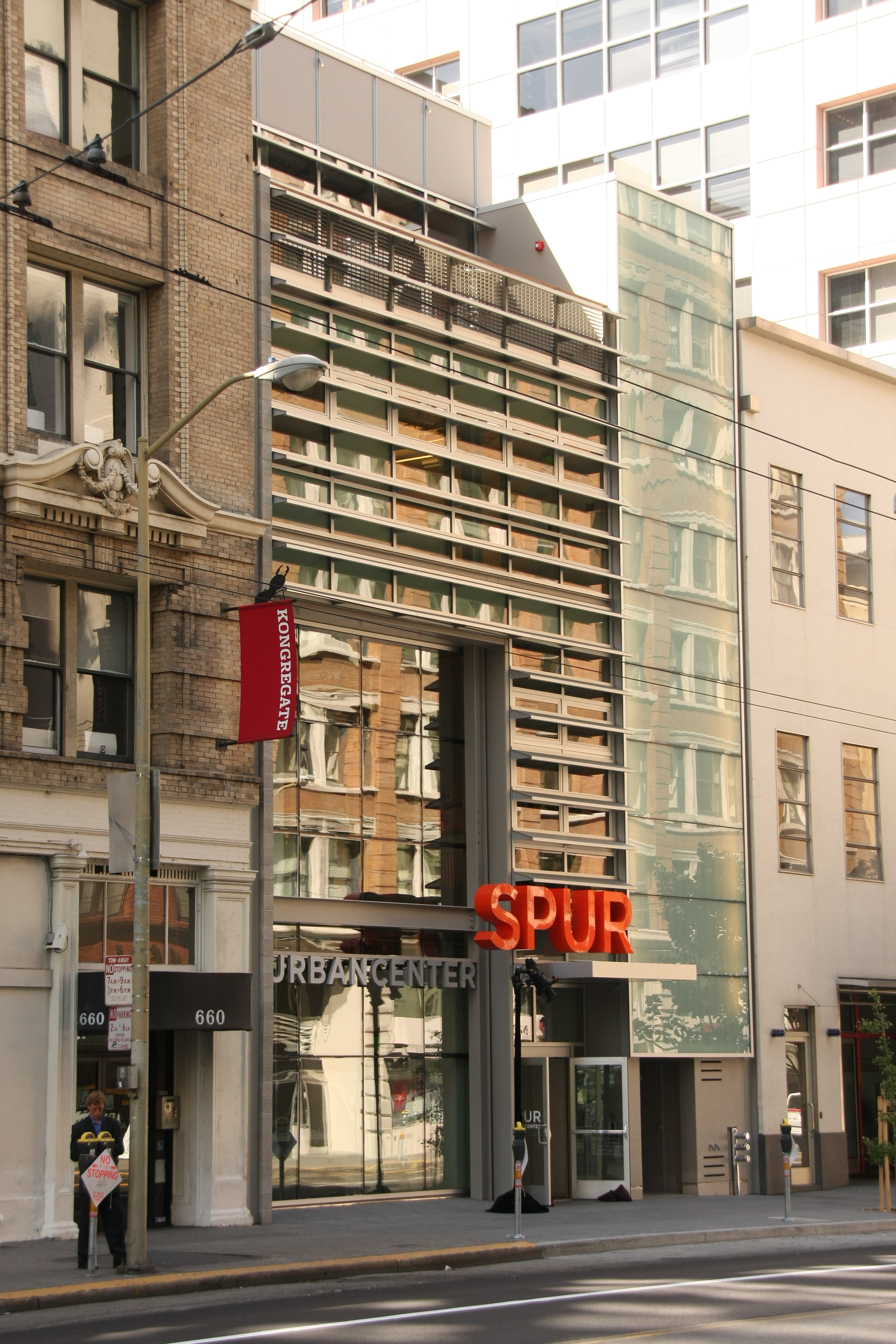
The SPUR Urban Center at 654 Mission Street, San Francisco.

San Francisco Bay Area Planning and Urban Research Association, commonly abbreviated as SPUR, is a think tank focused on urban policy in San Francisco Bay Area.

== History ==
SPUR's history dates back to 1910, when a group of city leaders came together to improve the quality of housing after the 1906 San Francisco earthquake and fire. That group, the San Francisco Housing Association, authored a report which led to the State Tenement House Act of 1911.

In the 1930s, the SFHA continued to advocate for housing concerns. In the 1940s, the SFHA merged with Telesis, a group of professors and urban planners from UC Berkeley's city planning program led by William Wurster, to become the San Francisco Planning and Housing Association. In 1942, the association landed a major success with the creation of San Francisco's Department of City Planning.

Starting in the 1950s, SFPHA advocated for urban renewal projects in San Francisco's largely Black Fillmore neighborhood that would ultimately displace at least 4,000 people and remove 4,700 homes. In 1959, the San Francisco Planning and Housing Association was reorganized into the San Francisco Planning and Urban Renewal Association. The organization served as community advisors for urban renewal projects in San Francisco's Western Addition and Fillmore neighborhoods as part of the federal urban redevelopment program.

Under the guise of revitalization of San Francisco as the Bay Area's central city, and a supposed effort to curb suburban sprawl and channel growth back into the urban core, their projects would ultimately displace residents and provide less housing units. Urban renewal also had a strong cultural impact, destroying San Francisco's thriving Black creative community and world-famous jazz scene.

Ultimately, 883 businesses and 4,729 households were displaced and 2,500 Victorians were demolished during the Western Addition project that SPUR spearheaded. In 1977, the organization was renamed to the San Francisco Planning and Urban Research Association.

=== Public Transportation ===
In the early 1970s, amidst growing public dissatisfaction with the deteriorating service of the San Francisco Municipal Railway (Muni), SPUR launched an in-depth investigation into the transit system's myriad problems and, on March 1, 1973, published the report Building a New Muni. It described Muni's state as "unacceptable" and detailed issues ranging from unreliable and unpleasant vehicles to systemic underfunding that hampered effective management and maintenance. The report included recommendations to address these failures, famously calling for transit to be recognized as an essential public service, like schools and fire departments, for which referring to a "deficit" is nonsense. On March 19, 1973, the San Francisco Board of Supervisors, in response to SPUR's demands, adopted the Transit-First policy.

== Current activities ==
Over the years, the organization has grown to more than 6,000 members and has diversified its focus, analyzing subjects from sea-level rise and renewable energy to food security and guaranteed income programs. SPUR also provides annual analysis and voting recommendations on California, San Francisco San José and Oakland ballot measures.

The organization has connection with government and corporate forces giving it influence. Leftist activists sees it as a villain due to such influence.

In 2012, SPUR initiated a long-range plan to work in all three of the Bay Area's central cities. The organization began work in San José in 2012 and Oakland in 2015, adding "Bay Area" to its name to reflect its broader scope.

== See also ==
- San Francisco Redevelopment Agency
