= Charles Eastman (disambiguation) =

Charles Eastman (1858–1939) was a Santee Dakota physician, writer, national lecturer, and reformer.

Charles Eastman may also refer to:

- Charles K. Eastman (1929–2009), American screenwriter and script doctor
- Charles M. Eastman (1940–2020), American professor of architecture
- Charles R. Eastman (1868–1918), American geologist and palaeontologist
- Charles S. Eastman (1864–1939), American politician and lawyer
- Charles Eastman (shot putter) (born 1903), American shot putter, 2nd at the 1923 USA Outdoor Track and Field Championships
