= Galen Cranz =

American architect

Galen Cranz is a Professor of the Graduate School, Architecture at the College of Environmental Design at the University of California, Berkeley, who studies the social and cultural bases of architectural and urban design. She is a certified teacher of the Alexander Technique, a kinesthetic educational system, who founded the new field "Body Conscious Design".

She is the author of The Politics of Park Design: A History of Urban Parks in America (1982), which surveys the rise of the park system from 1850 to the present through four stages – "the pleasure ground, the reform park, the recreation facility and the open space system", and the 1998 book The Chair: Rethinking Culture, Body, and Design.

== Major fellowships, grants, prizes, and honors ==
- 1964–1965, Reed College–Keele University Exchange Scholar to England
- 1966–1971, Multiple Research Fellowships, University of Chicago
- 1972–1974, Princeton University Committee on Research in the Humanities and Social Sciences
- 1973, Graham Foundation, rooftop use in New York City
- 1976–2014, Multiple Research Grants, University of California at Berkeley
- 1977, Honor award (7th through 10th entries) in State of California's energy-conscious office building design competition
- 1981–1984, Kellogg National Fellowship
- 1983, First Place, Parc de la Villette, Paris; member of Tschumi's design team
- 1983, Seventh Place, Design of Spectacle Island, Boston Inner Harbor
- 1985, First Prize, National Endowment for the Arts Cityscape Design Competition for St. Paul, Minnesota, co-designer and team leader
- 1986–1988, National Institute of Health, "Residential Quality for the Oldest Old"
- 1996, Graham Foundation for Advanced Study in Architecture, "Defining the Sustainable Park"
- 1998, Hewlett Packard cross-disciplinary teaching grant, "Office for the Future" with Seth Roberts, Psychology
- 2004, EDRA (Environmental Design Research Association) Achievement Award for The Chair
- 2005–2007, Principal Investigator, Latrobe Fellowship of the AIA (American Institute of the Architects) for collaboration among the Kaiser Permanente, Gordon Chong Architects, and University of California, Berkeley's Department of Architecture.
- 2009 Berkeley Engaged Scholarship Initiative (BESI) for developing a community-based service-learning course
- 2010–2011 Senior Fellow, Townsend Humanities Fellowship, UC Berkeley.
- 2011 Career Award of the Environmental Design Research Association (EDRA).

== Selected publications ==
- Galen Cranz, Ethnography for Designers (Routledge, 2016).
- Galen Cranz, "Sitting, Still" Architecture Boston, (2014).
- Galen Cranz and Eleftherios Pavlildes, Environmental Design Research: Body, City and the Buildings In between (Cognella, San Diego, 2012)
- Galen Cranz with Jess Wendover, Iris Tien, Mark Gillem, and Jon Norman, "College of Environmental Design, UC Berkeley Temporary Home", Designing for Designers, J. Nasar, W. F. E. Preiser & Tom Fisher (Eds.) (New York: Fairchild Books, 2007), pp.
- Galen Cranz with EunAh Cha, "Body Conscious Design in a Teen Space: Post Occupancy Evaluation of an Innovative Public Library", Public Libraries, Sept/Nov. 2006, pp. 48–56.
- Galen Cranz and C. Young, "The role of design in inhibiting or promoting use of common open space: The case of Redwood Gardens, Berkeley, CA". In S. Rodiek & B. Schwarz (Eds.), The Role of the Outdoors in Residential Environments for Aging (New York: Haworth Press, Inc., 2006), pp. 71–94.
- Galen Cranz and Michael Boland, "Defining the Sustainable Park: A Fifth Model for Urban Parks", Landscape Journal, Fall 2004, pp. 102–120.
- "A New Way of Thinking about Taste", The Nature of Craft and the Penland Experience (Lark, NY, 2004), pp. 130–136.
- "The Alexander Technique in the World of Design: Posture and the Common Chair, Part I: The Chair as Health Hazard", Journal of Bodywork and Movement Therapies, Vol 4, No. 2 (April 2000), pp. 90–96.
- "The Alexander Technique in the World of Design: Posture and the Common Chair, Part II: Body-conscious Design for Chairs, Interiors and Beyond", Journal of Bodywork and Movement Therapies, Vol. 4, No. 3 (July 2000), pp. 155–165.
- The Chair: Rethinking Culture, Body and Design. (Norton, New York, 1998, paperback 2000).
- "Now you aren't sitting comfortably", The Independent (UK), Design Notes section, October 3, 1998, p. 11.
- "Parks" entry in American Cities in Suburbs, An Encyclopedia, (Larry Schumsky, Ed.) (ABC-CLIO), pp. 554–58.
- "Community and Complexity on Campus: A Post-Occupancy Evaluation of the University of California, Haas School of Business", with Amy Taylor and Anne-Marie Broudehoux, Places, A Forum of Environmental Design. 1997 Vol. II, No.1 pp. 38–51.
- "The Chair is Where the Body Meets the Environment", in Curiosity Recaptured: Exploring Ways We Think and Move, Jerry Sontag, Ed. (Mornum Time Press, San Francisco, 1996), pp. 3–20.
- "How Principles of Sustainable Development Can and Must Shape Our Cities and Parks: The Case of Riverside South", in Aristides and Cleopatra (Eds.) International Association for Person-Environment Studies (IAPS) 12 Conference Proceedings (Aristotle University, Thessaloniki, Greece, 1992), pp. 85–89.
- The Politics of Park Design: A History of Urban Parks in America (1982)
- Galen Cranz, Amy Taylor, Anne-Marie Broudehoux, "Community and Complexity on Campus. A Post-Occupancy Evaluation of the University of California, Berkeley, Haas School of Business", Places, A Forum of Environmental Design, Winter 1997, Vol. 11, No. 1, pp. 38–51.
- "Four Models of Municipal Park Design in the United States", Denatured Visions: Landscape and Culture in the Twentieth Century, Wrede, S. and Adams, W. Eds. (NY: Museum of Modern Art: Abrams distributor, 1992), pp. 118–123.
- "Berkeley's Free Speech Controversy", Op. ed., Oakland Tribune, Jan. 31, 1990.
- The Politics of Park Design: A History of Urban Parks in America (Cambridge, Mass.: The MIT Press, 1982; paperback 1989).
- "Public Housing for the Elderly: A Study of Eight Housing Projects in New Jersey" in Housing for the Elderly: Design Directives and Policy Considerations, (Elsevier, New York, 1985).
- "Women in Urban Parks", Signs: Journal of Women in Culture and Society, Vol. 5 No. 3 (Spring 1980) reprinted in Stimpson (Ed.) Women & the American City (University of Chicago, 1981).
- "The Useful and the Beautiful: Urban Parks in China", Landscape, Volume 23, No. 2 (1979) pp. 3–10.
- "Photography in Chinese Popular Culture", Exposure: Journal of the Society of Photographic Educators, Vol. 16, No. 4 (Winter 1978), pp. 24–29.
- "Changing Roles of Urban Parks: From Pleasure Garden to Open Space", Landscape Magazine, Summer 1978, Vol. 22, No. 3, pp. 9–18.
