= Clare Cooper Marcus =

American architect (1934–2026)

- Born: Clare Cooper; April 19, 1934
- Died: January 18, 2026 (aged 91); Berkeley, California, U.S.
- Occupation: Architect
- Partner: Stephen Marcus

Clare Cooper Marcus (April 19, 1934 – January 18, 2026) was an American prominent educator in landscape architecture and architecture and a pioneer in the field of social issues in housing, open space design, and healing landscapes.

Clare Cooper Marcus was born in 1934 and raised in a north London suburb. She received her undergraduate degree in historical geography from University College, London and a Masters in urban and cultural Geography from University of Nebraska. She returned to England to teach cartography at the University of Sheffield, and worked as urban planner at the Ministry of Housing and London County Council. She returned to the US and earned a second Masters in City and Regional Planning from the University of California at Berkeley in 1965. She participated in counter-culture movement in the 1960s at Berkeley, joining in the student strikes, and agitating for free speech. She was inspired by the writings of Catherine Bauer Wurster on housing programs and Jane Jacobs on urban place-making.

Marcus worked for several years as a research associate in the Institute of Urban and Regional Development at the University of California at Berkeley and began teaching in the Department of Landscape Architecture in 1969. Her course on Social and Psychological Factors in Open Space Design was popular among undergraduate and graduate students alike. She held a joint appointment in the Department of Architecture where she taught seminars on social aspects of housing design, environments for the life cycle, and sense of place. She collaborated with many of her former students in writing articles and editing books.

Marcus was married to the landscape architect Stephen Marcus with whom she had two children, Jason and Lucy. After having retired from full-time teaching in 1994, she was principal of the firm Healing Landscapes specializing in healthcare settings and taught healthcare garden design at the Chicago Botanic Garden. She received numerous awards, including for exemplary design research from the National Endowment for the Arts, career award from the Environmental Design Research Association (EDRA), and a Guggenheim Fellowship. Her co-edited (with Carolyn Francis) volume People Places: Design Guidelines for Urban Open Space received a Merit Award from the American Society of Landscape Architects in 2000 and Healing Gardens: Therapeutic Benefits and Design Recommendations (co-edited with Marni Barnes) won the EDRA Award for Place Research in 2000.

Marcus advocated post-occupancy evaluation as a research method for studying public and semi-public open spaces. In her studies of Easter Hill Village in Richmond, California and St. Francis Square in San Francisco, she saw that semi-public open spaces in cluster housing foster a sense of community. She found these spaces to be well-used by residents, particularly by children. Her articles and book (with Wendy Sarkissian) Housing as if People Mattered: Site Design Guidelines for Medium-Density Family Housing published by the University of California Press in 1986 showed how medium density, low-rise cluster housing is supportive of families with children and a catalyst in building social networks. Marcus expanded her studies on open spaces in housing to other types—neighborhood and city parks, plazas, and campus open spaces in her edited volume (with Carolyn Francis) People Places: Design Guidelines for Urban Open Space first published by Van Nostrand Reinhold in 1990. She translated her findings in performance guidelines that would aid the designer and bridge the gap between research and practice.

The formative years of Marcus' childhood were spent in Buckinghamshire countryside during World War II where her family was evacuated from London. There she was free to explore the landscape and developed a lifelong affinity for the natural outdoors. She encouraged her design students to remember their own childhood environments and write their environmental autobiography to discover hidden biases while designing for their clients.

Marcus' work shows the impact of human potential movement in California in the 1960s. She attended seminars in the Carl Jung Institute in San Francisco and the Esalen Institute in Big Sur to delve deep into topics such as the age of Aquarius, sacred geometries in the landscape, self-transformation and becoming whole through integration of feminine and masculine archetypes. She wrote about the garden as a symbol of the higher self and the role of gardening in creating the spiritual community of Findhorn in Scotland. She adapted the Gestalt role playing therapeutic technique in her research on house as symbol of the self that was published as the book The House as a Mirror of Self: Exploring the Deeper Meaning of Home published by Conari Press in 1995. Marcus' own environmental autobiography and analysis of her self and growth are contained in Iona Dreaming: The Healing Power of Place, A Memoir published by Nicholas-Hays, Inc. in 2010. In this book written after a double bout with cancer, she reveals the remarkable power of place to heal psychological wounds and restore the spirit.

Marcus continued her research on restorative environments in the book (with Marni Barnes) Gardens in Healthcare Facilities: Uses, Therapeutic Benefits, and Design Recommendations published by The Center for Health Design, Inc. (Martinez, California) in 1995; in the edited volume (with Marni Barnes) Healing Gardens: Therapeutic Benefits and Design Recommendations published by John Wiley & Sons in 1999; and the book (with Naomi Sachs) Therapeutic Landscapes: An Evidence-Based Approach to Designing Healing Gardens and Restorative Outdoor Spaces published by John Wiley & Sons in 2014. She advocated designing ''salutogenic' urban spaces that promote health.

Marcus died on January 18, 2026, at the age of 91.
