= Telesis =

Philosophy on social advancement

Telesis (from the Greek τέλεσις /telesis/) or "planned progress" was a concept and neologism coined by the American sociologist Lester Frank Ward (often referred to as the "father of American sociology"), in the late 19th century to describe directed social advancement via education and the scientific method. The term has since been adopted as the name of numerous groups, schools, and businesses.

== Architecture and planning ==
A group of architects, landscape architects, and urban planners from the Bay Area, founded in late 1939 through the merging of two groups of architects, one from San Francisco and the other from the University of California, Berkeley, called themselves Telesis. Philosophically, the group also evolved from several larger international architectural movements, which included CIAM (Congrès International d'Architecture Moderne) and MARS (Modern Architectural Research Group).

Their stated aim was to research the development and implications of what architectural critic Lewis Mumford called the Second Bay Area Regional Style. As set forth in their founding statement in The Things Telesis Has Found Important, the group believed that "People and the Land make up the environment which has four distinct parts--a place to Live, Work, Play, and the Services which integrate these and make them operate. These components must be integrated in the community and urban region through rational planning, and through the use of modern building technology."

Noted Telesis members included William Wurster, Catherine Bauer Wurster, Vernon DeMars, Thomas Church, Garrett Eckbo, Grace McCann Morley, Geraldine Knight Scott, Joseph Allen Stein, Jack Hillmer, Francis Violich, and T. J. Kent, Jr. In addition to internal research and working groups that investigated such topics as speculative housing, industrial design, and the relationship of the physical environment of the San Francisco Bay Area to indigenous architectural styles, the group also organized several influential exhibitions on contemporary architecture and planning with the support of the San Francisco Museum of Art. Professional and personal papers from many of Telesis's members are collected in the Environmental Design Archives at the University of California, Berkeley.

== Sociology ==
The mechanics of society fall under two general groups: social statics and social dynamics. Social dynamics is further divided into social genesis and social telesis. Social telesis may be further divided into individual telesis and collective telesis.

- Telesis: Progress consciously planned and produced by intelligently directed effort.
- Social telesis: The intelligent direction of social activity towards the achievement of a desired and understood end.

- Collective telesis: Adaptation of means to ends by society.

- Individual telesis: The conscious adaptation of conduct by an individual to the achievement of his own consciously apprehended ends.

== See also ==
- Cultural Creatives
- Allied Telesis
- Pacific Telesis
- Polytely
- Telos (philosophy)
