= Richard Bender =

American architect (1930–2022)

- Born: January 18, 1930; Brooklyn, New York, U.S.
- Died: October 8, 2022 (aged 92); Oakland, California, U.S.
- Education: Massachusetts Institute of Technology; Harvard University
- Occupations: Architect, urban planner, educator

Richard Bender (January 18, 1930 – October 8, 2022) was an American architect, educator, and urban planner with extensive experience in urban, campus and community design. He also served as dean emeritus and professor of architecture at the College of Environmental Design at the University of California at Berkeley. Bender has also taught at Cooper Union, Columbia University, the Graduate School of Design at Harvard University, the Massachusetts Institute of Technology, the Swiss Federal Technical University, and the Instituto Universitario Arquitettura in Venice.

== Life and career ==
Bender served as chairman of Berkeley's Department of Architecture, as associate dean for research in the College of Environmental Design, as director of the Campus Planning Study Group and the Urban Construction Laboratory at Berkeley. He was the Visiting “GC-5” Professor of Urban Design and Construction at Tokyo University, and an honorary professor at the Université Europeene de Maitrise D’Oeuvre Urbaine in Cergy¬Pontoise, France. In the United States, he was a member of the Federal Construction Council of the Building Research Advisory Board, an advisor to the National Endowment for the Arts, and a technical advisor to the National ‘Douglas Commission’ in Urban Problems.

According to biographer Elizabeth Douthitt Byrne, in Bender's “distinguished and wide-ranging international career in teaching and practice [he] has studied or worked with and/or been associated with some of the most influential artists, designers, builders and planners of the 20th and 21st centuries, including Walter Gropius, Marcel Breuer, Josep Lluis Sert, Mark Rothko, Frank Lloyd Wright, Pete Seeger, Norman Mailer, Buckminster Fuller, Renzo Piano, Daniel Libeskind, Margaret Mead, Le Corbusier, Elisabeth Kubler-Ross, Saul Steinberg, I.M. Pei, Ada Louise Huxtable, Jean Nouvel, Fumihiko Maki, Reyner Banham, and many, many more. With his teaching and practice in New York, Greenland, Switzerland, France and Japan, he relishes learning and stimulating learning, bringing people together across disciplines.”

Bender was a founding director of the nonprofit BRIDGE Housing Corporation. He continues as an emeritus director. He served The Getty Trust as advisor during the design and construction of The Getty Center in Los Angeles. He has directed master plans for the Benesse Art Site on the Island of Naoshima, Japan and Nanyang Technical University in Singapore, as well as directing plans throughout the University of California System, including at The University of California at San Diego, UC Santa Cruz as well as UC Berkeley. Commemorating his important service to the University of California system, then Chancellor Chang-lin Tien awarded Bender the Berkeley Citation in 1990. At the ceremony, the chancellor noted that, “Dean Bender revitalized the planning process on the Berkeley Campus. He defined, instituted and led the Design Review Board. This has worked so well that he has been called upon by several other UC campuses to institute the concept there. And he has left his mark on so many building projects that it must truly be said of him, as for others like Frederick Law Olmsted and John Galen Howard, that the campus itself as a built environment is in significant part his monument.”

In 2012, Bender was honored with the creation of a fellowship at the College of Environmental Designed, which was named after him. "The Fellowship, established by an anonymous donor, will be used to support a dual-degree graduate student in the Department of City and Regional Planning and the Department of Architecture who focuses on the design of affordable housing in livable communities," building off Bender's legacy of affordability in community planning.

Bender died in Oakland, California on October 8, 2022, at the age of 92.

== Publications ==
Selected master plans:

- “Naoshima Master Plan”, Benesse, Okayama, (with Phillip Enquist and SOM Chicago, 1995
- “Master Plan and Implementation Program” for the University of California Santa Cruz, (with EDAW & SOM) 1989
- “Master Plan and Implementation Program” for the University of California San Diego (with SOM) 1989
- Urban design studies for the Berkeley campus / contributors, Campus Planning Study Group, Richard Bender, University of California, Berkeley. Campus Planning Study Group. Berkeley : Center for Planning & Development Research, College of Environmental Design, University of California, Berkeley, 1979–1982.
- “Boeing in Building – a Report on the Potential for Involvement”, (with William Meyer and Building Systems Development, San Francisco), June, 1970
- “Master Plan for CERN” for the Nuclear Research Center in Geneva, Die Bauten des CERN, Organisation Europeenne pour la Recherche Nucleaire, in Gent, Verlage Buchdruckeri Winterthur. Ag, with Architekten Dr, Rudolf Steiger und Peter Steiger, Zurich, October, 1960

Books and selected chapters:

- A Crack in the Rearview Mirror: Views of the Industrialization of Building, Van Nostrand Reinhold, 1973
- The Form of Housing, (Housing and Urbanism) edited by Sam Davis, Van Nostrand Reinhold, 1977.
- “Berkeley Campus and Community” Univer-Cities, Strategic Implications for Asia, Richard Bender, Emily Marthinsen, John Parman, Editor, Anthony SC Teo, Volumes I and II, World Scientific Press, London 2015
- The Future of the City - Centre for Studies and Research, Dipartimento di Architettura e Urbanistica per l’Ingegneria - Università di Roma Sapienza. Issue #03, February 2007
- “San Francisco: Evolution of a City and its Region”, Proceedings of the 49th IFHP World Congress, International Federation of Housing and Planning, Rome, October 2–5, 2005 (Prof. Richard Bender with John Parman)
- “New Directions for A New Millennium - One World - Global But Local”’ Keynote Address, Proceedings of the Nagoya International Design Conference, October 6, 1997
- “A University Without Walls – Fact or Fancy”, Trusteeship, The Association of Governing Boards of Universities and Colleges, July/August 1996
- “Affordable Housing, Liveable Communities,” PLACES, MIT Press, Vol. 2, No. 1, May 1985.
- “The Factory Without Walls: Industrialization in Residential Construction,” California Management Review, Spring 1976, Vol. XVIII, No. 3, (with John Parman.)
- “The Industrialization of the Building Site: An Analysis of Experience in Operation Breakthrough,” Industrialization Forum, Vol. VI, No. 1, (with John Parman.) 1975
- “Incremental Infrastructure,” Proceedings of the MIT Symposium on Strategies for A.I.D. Programs in Selected Areas of Science and Technology: Vol. 2: Housing, Transportation and Water Resources, ed. J.P. Ruina, April 1974.
- “Dust to Dust - The Ultimate System,” Progressive Architecture, December 1973.
- “Industrialization and Self-Help Housing,: Proceedings of the Shirtsleeve Conference on Housing at M.I.T., edited by E. Allen, M.I.T., May 1972.
- “Pipe Dreams: Scenarios for Change in the Public Service Industries,” Architectural Design, March 1972.
- “General Motors as General Contractor,” Progressive Architecture, April 1970.
- “Selected Technological Aspects of the American Building Industry: The Industrialization of Building”, A report to the National Commission on Urban Problems, published by The Commission and the Commerce Learning House, PB 1852110 January, 1969
- “Budget Beach House”, (The ‘Bender House’ and community in East Hampton Long Island), New York Times, Sunday Magazine, May 3, 1964

== Sources ==
- http://bancroft.berkeley.edu/ROHO/collections/subjectarea/univ_hist/fac_adm_reg.html
- http://oskicat.berkeley.edu/search~S1/X?SEARCH=(richard%20bender)&SORT=D
