= Ananya Roy =

Indian academic

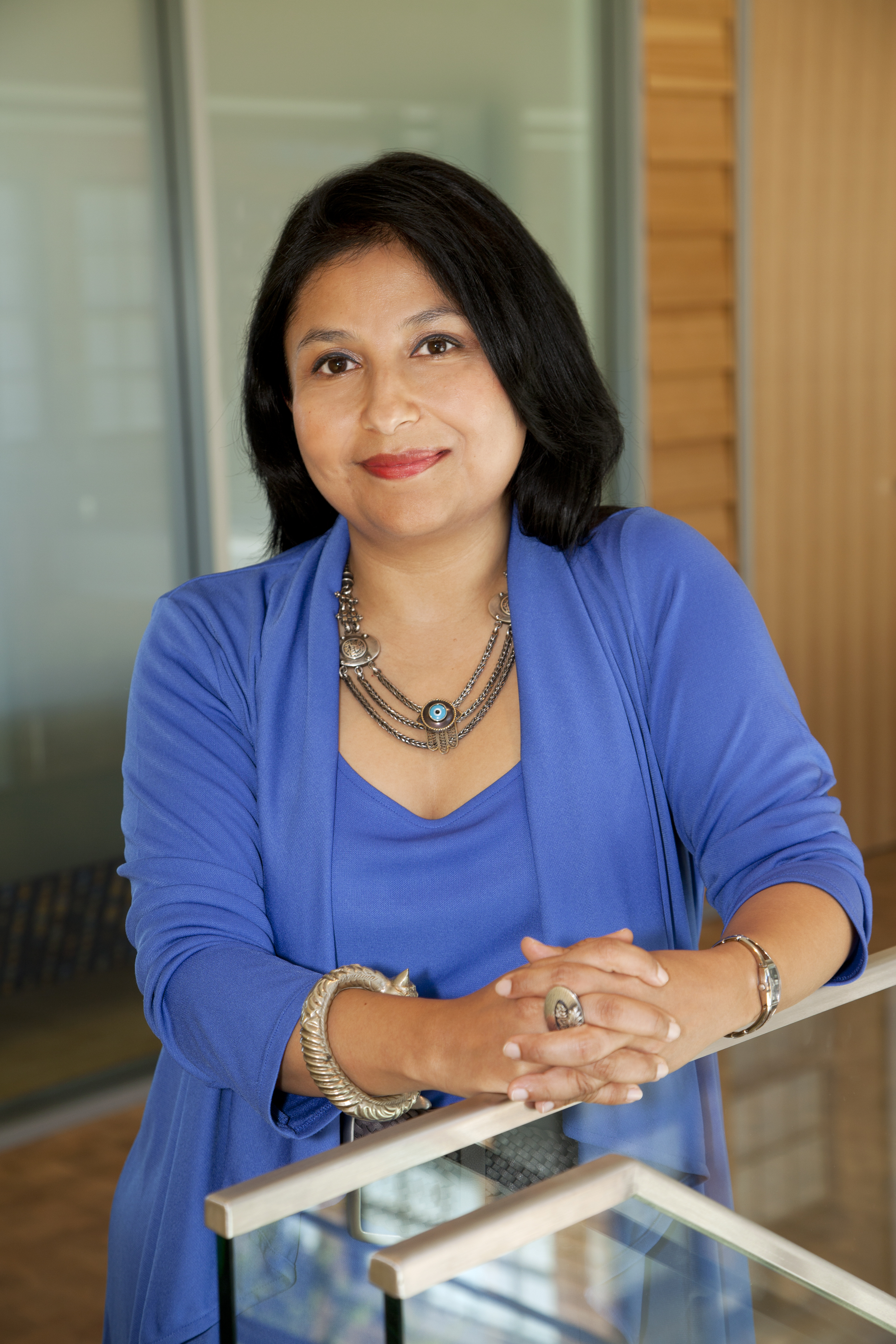
- Born: 22 January 1970 (age 56); Calcutta, India

Academic background
- Education: Mills College; University of California, Berkeley

Academic work
- Discipline: international development urban studies
- Institutions: UCLA Luskin School of Public Affairs; University of California, Berkeley
- Main interests: global urbanism
- Notable works: Poverty Capital: Microfinance and the Making of Development

Ananya Roy is a scholar of international development and global urbanism. Born in Calcutta, India (1970), Roy is Professor and Meyer and Renee Luskin Chair in Inequality and Democracy at the UCLA Luskin School of Public Affairs. She has been a professor of City and Regional Planning and Distinguished Chair in Global Poverty and Practice at the University of California, Berkeley. She holds a Bachelor of Comparative Urban Studies (1992) degree from Mills College, and Master of City Planning (1994) and Doctor of Philosophy (1999) degrees from the Department of City and Regional Planning at the University of California at Berkeley.

== Career ==
Roy works in three major areas:

1. The analysis of urban poverty in the global South;
2. The investigation of new frontiers of capital accumulation, notably the conversion of economies of poverty into globally circulating capital; and
3. The examination of new formations of global urbanism, notably bold urban planning experiments undertaken by nation-states in Asia.

Roy engages with feminist and ethnographic methodologies and often draws upon post-colonial feminism for theoretical inspiration.

In the field of urban studies, Roy is well known for advancing the theoretical concept of "urban informality" and the call for "new geographies of theory" that are attentive to the urban condition of the global South. She argues for a transnational approach to urbanism and urban planning, and more recently, for a transnational approach to politics and ethics.

In 2015 Roy was named Professor of Urban Planning and Social Welfare and Meyer and Renee Luskin Chair in Inequality and Democracy at the UCLA Luskin School of Public Affairs. She had been Professor of City and Regional Planning and Distinguished Chair in Global Poverty and Practice at the University of California at Berkeley, and, prior to that, held the Friesen Chair in Urban Studies and was a founder of the Urban Studies major at UC Berkeley. She also served as Education Director of the Blum Center for Developing Economies, where she was the founding chair of the undergraduate minor in Global Poverty and Practice at UC Berkeley. She served as co-director of the Global Metropolitan Studies Center from 2009 to 2012, and she served as Associate Dean of International and Area Studies from 2005 to 2009.

At Berkeley, Roy taught graduate and undergraduate students. Her undergraduate course, "Global Poverty: Challenges and Hopes in the New Millennium," drew 700 students each Fall at UC Berkeley. In 2006, she was awarded the Distinguished Teaching Award, the highest teaching honor UC Berkeley bestows on its faculty. Also in 2006, Roy was awarded the Distinguished Faculty Mentors award, a recognition bestowed by the Graduate Assembly of the University of California at Berkeley. In 2008, Roy was the recipient of the Golden Apple Teaching award, the only teaching award given by the student body. She was the 2009 California Professor of the Year by CASE/Carnegie Foundation. Most recently, Roy received the 2011 Excellence in Achievement Award of the California Alumni Association, a lifetime achievement recognition.

Along with colleagues in the UC system, Roy has been active in the mobilizations for public education in California. Her role in such struggles was chronicled in The New Yorker in 2009. Roy herself has written about fragile solidarities of the movement under the theme, "We Are All Students of Color Now". Roy has appeared on Democracy Now! to discuss these issues, as well as her work on poverty capitalism.

== Work ==
Her book, Poverty Capital: Microfinance and the Making of Development is the recipient of the 2011 Paul Davidoff Book Award of the Association of Collegiate Schools of Planning. The primary book award in urban planning, the Davidoff prize "recognizes an outstanding book publication promoting participatory planning and positive social change, opposing poverty and racism as factors in society and seeking ways to reduce disparities between rich and poor; white and black; men and women." Roy has argued that microfinance is an instrument of financial inclusion, a part of the "democratization of capital," but also that it is potentially a new global subprime market, one in which debt is securitized and traded In a recent special issue of Public Culture, which she guest-edited, Roy highlights the making of poverty capitalism and markets in humanitarian goods Her work contrasts such approaches with poverty interventions that are concerned with social protection and the transformation of inequality.

In 2014, Roy, in conjunction with the Blum Center for Developing Economies and the UCLA Luskin Institute for Inequality and Democracy developed the #GlobalPOV project. The project uses digital and social media to expand the conversation about global poverty beyond the confinements of academia. Rather than provide solutions to global poverty, it encourages people to reflect and critically engage with their relationship to spatially distant poverty as well as poverty that exists within the context of one’s everyday life. Videos narrated by Roy, Khalid Kadir (UC Berkeley lecturer), Genevieve Negrón-Gonzales (University of San Francisco professor), and Clare Talwalker (UC Berkeley lecturer) are uploaded to YouTube, and conversations are encouraged over twitter via the hashtag, #GlobalPOV.

Since the inauguration of President Trump in 2016, Roy has published several articles about the need for planners to be politically engaged. Together with the UCLA Abolitionist Planning Group, Roy created a resource guide titled “Abolitionist Planning for Resistance” that frames key issues around which to mobilize political action such as civil liberties, policing, housing rights, union labor, sanctuary cities, and environmental justice.

In her article “The Infrastructure of Assent: Professions in the Age of Trumpism,” Roy criticizes the eagerness of built environment professions, specifically architecture, planning and international development, to uncritically align themselves with racist governments, institutions, figures of power in exchange for recognition and profit. She argues that students, educators, and professionals must reject a culture of complicity and develop one of “disobedience, refusal and resistance.”

== Authored books ==
- 2010. Poverty Capital: Microfinance and the Making of Development. Routledge
- 2003. City Requiem, Calcutta: Gender and the Politics of Poverty. University of Minnesota Press.

== Co-authored books ==
- 2017. "Teach.Organize.Resist," UCLA Luskin Institute for Inequality and Democracy, co-authored by Ananya Roy, Andrés Carrasquillo, Daniel Bessner, Matt Spark, Richard Hebdige, Janet O'Shea, Laura Murat, Malini Ranganathan, Helga Leitner.

== Co-edited books ==
- 2011. Worlding Cities: Asian Experiments and the Art of Being Global. Co-Editor: Aihwa Ong. Blackwell: SUSC Series.
- 2008. The Practice of International Health. Oxford University Press, New York, co-edited with Daniel Perlman.
- 2004. Urban Informality: Transnational Perspectives from the Middle East, South Asia, and Latin America. Lanham: Lexington Books, co-edited with Nezar AlSayyad.

== Articles ==
- 2016. "Whiteness: The University in the Age of Trumpism" Society and Space.
- 2012. "Ethnographic Circulations: Space-Time Relations in the Worlds of Poverty Management" Environment and Planning A, 44, 31-41.
- 2012. "Subjects of Risk: Technologies of Gender in the Making of Millennial Development" Public Culture, 24:1, 131-155.
- 2012. "Entrepreneurs of Millennial Capitalism" Antipode 44:2, 545-553 (as part of the symposium on Poverty Capital, edited by Matthew Sparke).
- 2011. "The Agonism of Utopia: Dialectics at a Standstill" Traditional Dwellings and Settlements Review 13:1.
- 2011. "We Are All Students of Color Now" Representations 116: 1, 177-188.
- 2011. "Critical Transnationalism: Placing Planning in the World" Journal of Planning Education and Research, published OnlineFirst, 20 April, in print XX(X) 1-10.
- 2011. "Slumdog Cities: Rethinking Subaltern Urbanism" International Journal of Urban and Regional Research, 35:2, 223-238.
- 2011. "Urbanisms, Worlding Practices, and the Theory of Planning" Planning Theory, 10:1, 6-15.
- 2010. "The Democratization of Capital? Microfinance and Its Discontents" World Financial Review, 18 December.
- 2009. "Civic Governmentality: The Politics of Inclusion in Beirut and Mumbai" Antipode, 41:1, 159-179.
- 2009. "Strangely Familiar: Planning and the Worlds of Insurgence and Informality" Planning Theory, 8:1, 7-11.
- 2009. "Why India Cannot Plan Its Cities: Informality, Insurgence, and the Idiom of Urbanization" Planning Theory, 8:1, 76-87.
- 2009. "The 21st Century Metropolis: New Geographies of Theory" Regional Studies, 43:6, 819-830.
- 2008. "Global Norms and Urban Forms: The Millennium Development Goals" Planning Theory and Practice 9:2, 251-274.
- 2008. "Post-Liberalism: On The Ethico-Politics of Planning" Planning Theory 7:1, 92-102.
- 2007. "The Location of Practice: A Response to John Forester" Development Southern Africa 24:4, 623-628.
- 2006. "Medieval Modernity: On Citizenship and Urbanism in a Global Era" Space and Polity, 10:1, 1-20 (with Nezar AlSayyad).
- 2005. "Praxis in the Time of Empire" Planning Theory, 5:1, 7-29.
- 2005. "Medieval Modernity: Citizenship in Contemporary Urbanism" Applied Anthropologist, 25:2, September (with Nezar AlSayyad).
- 2005. "Urban Informality: Toward an Epistemology of Planning" Journal of the American Planning Association, 71:2, 147-158.
- 2003. "Paradigms of Propertied Citizenship: Transnational Techniques of Analysis" Urban Affairs Review, 38:4, 463-491.
- 2001. "A Public Muse: On Planning Convictions and Feminist Contentions." Journal of Planning Education and Research, 21:2, 109-126.
- 2001. "Traditions of the Modern: A Corrupt View" Traditional Dwellings and Settlements Review, 12:2, 7-21.
