= Donald and Helen Olsen House =

Historic house in California, United States

- U.S. National Register of Historic Places
- Berkeley Landmark
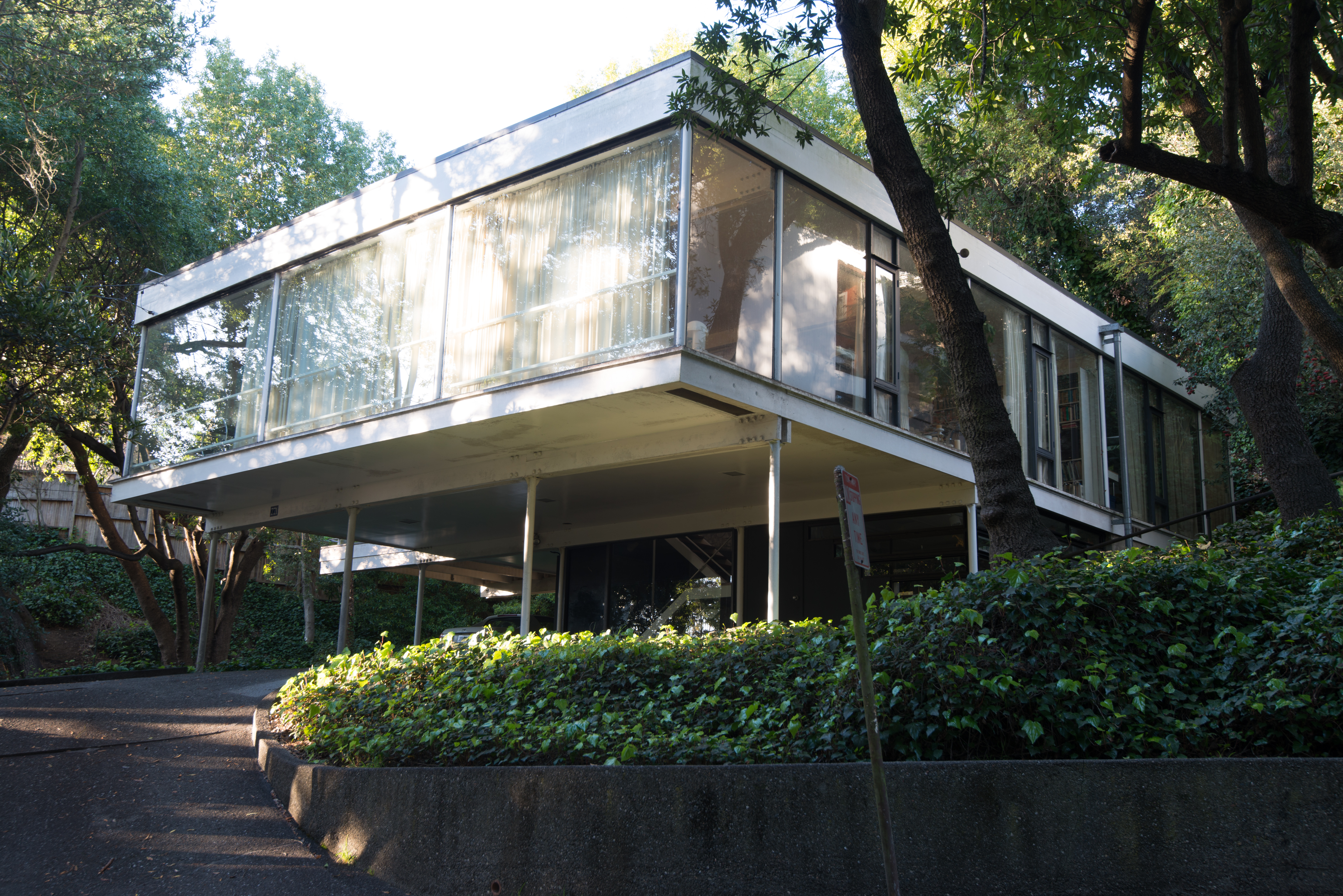

- Location within Oakland, California Location within California Location within the United States
- Location: 771 San Diego Road, Berkeley, California
- Coordinates: 37°53′46″N 122°16′21″W
- Area: less than 1 acre (0.40 ha)
- Architect: Donald Olsen
- NRHP reference No.: 10000812
- BERKL No.: 304

Significant dates
- Added to NRHP: October 1, 2010
- Designated BERKL: March 5, 2009

The Donald and Helen Olsen House, in Berkeley, California, was built in 1954.

It is a Modernist, International-style house designed by architect Donald Olsen. Olsen is a native of Minnesota who studied under Walter Gropius at Harvard and established an architecture practice in Berkeley in 1953.

The house is situated on a slope in the North Berkeley Hills near John Hinkel Park. The structure's main floor was built above ground level to maximize the site's views of San Francisco Bay and the Golden Gate Bridge. However, the view has been obscured over the years by the growth of mature trees on the property. The National Park Service described the house's style as follows: "The house's design is specifically the International style popularized in Europe by architects Ludwig Mies van der Rohe, Walter Gropius, and Le Corbusier. The Olsen House displays the geometries, ethos, strict formalism and rigor that embody this utopian style." The house also includes a mural by artist Claire Falkenstein.

The building was listed on the U.S. National Register of Historic Places on October 1, 2010. The listing was announced as the featured listing in the National Park Service's weekly list of October 8, 2010. In its write-up, the Park Service called Olsen "an important mid-20th-century Bay Area architect."
