= Donald Olsen =

American architect (1919–2015)

- Born: July 23, 1919; Minnesota, USA
- Died: March 21, 2015 (aged 95)
- Education: University of Minnesota, Harvard University
- Occupations: Architect, Educator
- Years active: 1953–2015
- Spouse: Helen Olsen
- Practice: Donald Olsen Architecture
- Buildings: Olsen House (Berkeley, California)
- Projects: Wurster Hall (UC Berkeley)

Donald Olsen (July 23, 1919—March 21, 2015) was an American architect and educator. He was an important mid-20th-century San Francisco Bay Area modernist architect.

== Biography ==
Olsen was born in Minnesota. He studied at the University of Minnesota, and later under Walter Gropius at Harvard University.

After graduation, he briefly worked at the firm of Eliel Saarinen and Eero Saarinen in Bloomfield Hills, Michigan. Olsen established an architecture practice in Berkeley, California in 1953. In 1954, he designed Olsen House (known as Donald and Helen Olsen House) in the International Style in Berkeley, California. Olsen was a member of the University of California, Berkeley's School of Architecture faculty, which became the Department of Architecture when the College of Environmental Design was founded in 1959. Along with Vernon DeMars and Joseph Esherick, he designed Wurster Hall, which opened in 1964.
