= Lisa Iwamoto =

Japanese-American architect

Lisa Iwamoto is an American designer, educator, and author. She is a professor of architecture at the University of California, Berkeley, where she chairs the Department of Architecture and holds the David K. Woo Chair in Environmental Design. She is the author of Digital Fabrications: Architectural and Material Techniques, published in 2013 by the Princeton Architectural Press.

== Education and career ==
Iwamoto graduated from the University of Colorado Boulder and the Harvard Graduate School of Design.

In 2002, she cofounded IwamotoScott Architecture, an architecture firm in San Francisco, with Craig Scott that was "conceived initially as an academic practice".

In 2021, Iwamoto was appointed as Chair of the Department of Architecture at the UC Berkeley College of Environmental Design.

== Recognition ==
In 2018, she was named as one of five winners of the fifth annual Women in Architecture awards by Architectural Record.
