= Vishaan Chakrabarti =

American architect

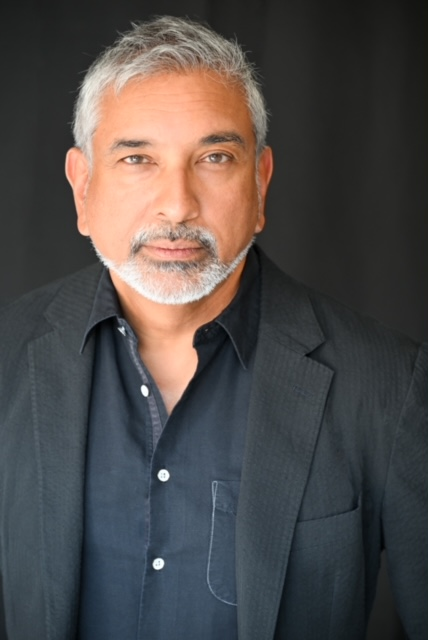
- Chakrabarti in 2024
- Born: 29 November 1966 (age 59); Kolkata, India
- Education: Cornell University, University of California, Berkeley, Massachusetts Institute of Technology
- Occupations: Architect; Urbanist
- Notable work: A Country of Cities: A Manifesto for an Urban America; The Architecture of Urbanity: Designing for Nature, Culture, and Joy
- Practice: Practice for Architecture and Urbanism
- Buildings: Domino Sugar Refinery

Vishaan Chakrabarti (born November 29, 1966) is an American architect and professor. He is the founder of Practice for Architecture and Urbanism (PAU), which is an architecture firm based in New York. In 2018 he was named a fellow of the American Institute of Architects. In 2019, the Royal Architectural Institute of Canada named him an Honorary Fellow. For a period of one year, from July 2020 to September 2021, Chakrabarti served as the Dean at the College of Environmental Design at UC Berkeley.

== Early life and education ==
Chakrabarti was born in Kolkata, India in 1966. His family moved to the United States in 1968 when he was two years old. His undergraduate education was completed at Cornell University where he holds dual bachelor's degrees in Art History and Engineering. Chakrabarti attended the University of California, Berkeley, where he received his Master of Architecture degree, and the Massachusetts Institute of Technology where he received a Master of City Planning degree.

== Career ==
He began his career at Skidmore, Owings & Merrill LP in New York where he worked as an Associate Partner and Director of Urban Design. In 2003 Chakrabarti was named Director of the Manhattan Office of the New York Department of City Planning under Mayor Michael Bloomberg. Shortly after this in 2005 he served as the President of Moynihan Station Venture at The Related Companies. In 2009 he was named the Marc Holliday Professor and Director of the Master of Science in Real Estate Development program at Columbia's GSAPP. Then in 2011 he became the founding director of the Center for Urban Real Estate (CURE).

From 2012 until 2015, Chakrabarti was a partner at SHoP Architects.

After leaving SHop in 2015, Chakrabarti founded PAU (Practice for Architecture and Urbanism), through which he has been involved in projects such as the master plan for the site occupied by the rail yards in Sunnyside, Queens; the design for the adaptive reuse of the Domino Sugar Refinery in Brooklyn; Penn Palimpsest, a proposal for reimagining New York's Penn Station; and the design for Hobson College, a residential college at Princeton University. He also serves as Collaborating Architect with Foster + Partners for JPMorgan Chase's global headquarters at 270 Park Avenue.

Chakrabarti assumed the deanship of the University of California, Berkeley's College of Environmental Design, in 2020. In September 2021 he announced he was stepping down as dean after one year, citing family health issues. Chakrabarti is an alumnus of CED's graduate architecture program and previously served as a member of the college's Dean’s Advisory Council.

During the Fall of 2024, Chakrabarti served as the Thomas J. Baird Visiting Critic at Cornell University College of Architecture, Art, and Planning.

In June, 2026, the United States Department of Transportation and Amtrak announced PAU, the architecture firm led by Chakrabarti, as the lead design architect for the redevelopment of New York Penn Station.

== Publications ==
- 2013: A Country of Cities: A Manifesto for an Urban America
- 2013: NYC 2040: Housing the Next One Million New Yorkers
- 2024: The Architecture of Urbanity: Designing for Nature, Culture, and Joy

== Awards and recognition ==
Chakrabarti was elected to the American Institute of Architects’ College of Fellows in 2018 and was named an Honorary Fellow of the Royal Architectural Institute of Canada (RAIC) in 2019.

In 2025, Chakrabarti was named the Edmund N. Bacon Urban Design Award honoree by DesignPhiladelphia for his contributions to urban design and architecture.
