= Bart J. Morse =

Bart Jennings Morse
- Born: August 16, 1938; Sandy, Utah, U.S.
- Died: April 20, 2010 (aged 71)
- Occupation: Artist

Bart Jennings Morse (August 16, 1938 – April 20, 2010, Sandy Utah), was an American artist known for his watercolor paintings that depict the landscapes of the American Southwest. His style combined figurative elements with the use of color, surface, and imagery.

== Early life and education ==
Born in Sandy, Utah, Morse was raised in a log cabin on his family's farm near the Wasatch Mountains. He developed an early appreciation for art, influenced by his high school art teacher, Don Olsen, who introduced him to abstract expressionism. Morse earned a Bachelor of Science from Brigham Young University in 1962 and a Master of Fine Arts in painting and printmaking from the University of Washington in 1964.

== Career ==
In 1970, Morse joined the University of Arizona's Art Department as an assistant professor, where he taught until his retirement in 2002. He directed the painting department and overhauled and improved the printmaking department. Morse conducted scholarly research on Aboriginal art in Australia and European watercolorists.

Morse's work can be found in public and private collections including the University of Utah Museum of Fine Arts, the Tucson Museum of Art, and the Springville Museum of Art. His paintings were inspired from his outdoor adventures, including backpacking, hunting, and fishing in the remote regions of Northern Arizona and Southern Utah. He had a particular interest in the petroglyphs and pictographs of the Fremont and Anasazi cultures, which influenced his artistic output.

Throughout his career, Morse participated in over 60 individual and group exhibitions. He was represented by Phillips Gallery in Salt Lake City and was featured as a guest artist in various publications, including the "Dialogue Journal."

== Selected collections ==
- Springville Museum of Art
- Salt Lake County Art in Public Places
- University of Utah Museum of Fine Arts
- University of Arizona Museum of Art
- Salt Lake City International Airport
- Brigham Young University

== Death ==
Morse died on April 20, 2010, in Newberg, Oregon, after a battle with Progressive Supranuclear Palsy.
