= Elizabeth Bauer Mock =

American architect

- Born: Elizabeth Bauer; 1911; Lexington, Massachusetts, U.S.
- Died: February 8, 1998 (aged 86–87)
- Other names: Elizabeth B. Kassler, Elizabeth Mock
- Education: Vassar College
- Occupations: Professor, curator, author, journalist
- Notable work: The Architecture of Bridges, Modern Gardens and the Landscape, "What is Modern Architecture?"
- Spouse: Rudolf Mock
- Children: Fritz Mock
- Parent(s): Alberta Krouse Bauer, Jacob Bauer
- Relatives: Catherine Bauer Wurster, Louis Bauer

Elizabeth (Bauer) Mock (later Kassler) (1911 – February 8, 1998) was director of the Department of Architecture and Design at the Museum of Modern Art (MoMA) and a university professor. She was a charter apprentice at Frank Lloyd Wright's Taliesin, and the first former Taliesin fellow to join the MoMA staff. She was an influential advocate for modern architecture in the United States.

Elizabeth Bauer Mock Kassler was born in Lexington, Massachusetts in 1911 as Elizabeth Bauer to Alberta Krouse Bauer, a homemaker, and Jacob Bauer, a New Jersey state highway engineer. Her older sister was Catherine Bauer Wurster, a prominent public housing advocate and urban planning educator, and her younger brother was Louis Bauer. She graduated from the Vail Deane School in 1928. In 1932 she graduated from Vassar College, where she majored in English.

After college she became one of the first fellows at Frank Lloyd Wright’s Taliesin studio near Spring Green, Wisconsin. It was at Taliesin where she met her first husband, Rudolph Mock, a draftsman from Basel, Switzerland who worked in Wright’s studio from January 1931 to April 1933. After their marriage, they briefly lived in Switzerland.

Her involvement with the MoMA started in 1937 when she began working part-time for the museum’s Curator of Architecture and Industrial Design, John McAndrew. A year later she co-circulated her first exhibition, “What is Modern Architecture?”. She became McAndrew's full-time assistant in 1940. When McAndrew was dismissed in 1942, Mock became the director. She remained at MoMA until 1946. During her time there, she produced many exhibits, including: “Built in the U.S.A.: 1932–1944” (1944), “Tomorrow’s Small House: Models and Plans” (1945), and “If You Want to Build a House”. She curated seven MoMA exhibitions in total between 1938 and 1946.

In 1946 and 1947, she and Rudolph lived in Knoxville, TN designing pre-fab housing for the Tennessee Valley Authority. Some of the buildings were in Fontana Village.

In 1948, she separated from Rudolph and moved to Taliesin West with her son Fritz for one season. In 1949 she became an assistant professor of architectural history and librarian at the University of Oklahoma. After her divorce, she married Kenneth Stone Kassler in 1951 and moved to Princeton, New Jersey. In Princeton she continued to write for architecture journals, the MoMA, and popular magazines. Kassler died in 1964, the same year Bauer became a research associate at the School of Architecture and Urban Planning at Princeton University where she served until 1971.

According to Concordia University's Research Chair in Art History, Kristina Huneault, Mock's books "strove to persuade a new generation of homebuyers of how modernism might improve their lives and the quality of North American architectural culture overall.” They include If You Want to Build a House (1946), The Architecture of Bridges (1949), and Modern Gardens and the Landscape (1964, known then as Elizabeth B. Kassler).

Her book on bridges is described by Encyclopædia Britannica as "the first major book on bridges to give a modern viewpoint." Modern Gardens and the Landscape is considered the authoritative survey of its subject. It was billed by the MoMA as "the first book to discuss the relationship between the modern garden and the natural landscape in terms of contemporary aesthetics." Modern Gardens and the Landscape included the works of Burle Marx, Bernard Rudofsky, Gunnar Asplund and Luis Barragan. Her books were all published by the Museum of Modern Art.

A 1979 visit to Taliesin West inspired her to put together a retrospective directory of the Taliesin Fellowship in time for its 50th anniversary (in 1982). She collected all the listings herself, and in 1981 published 450 copies of The Directory, 1932–1982, The Taliesin Fellowship, A Directory of Members. This was the first such directory in Taliesin history and it inspired the Frank Lloyd Wright Foundation to develop similar directories.

In 1990 she retired to a retirement community in Lexington, Massachusetts.

== Exhibitions curated at Museum of Modern Art ==
- Planning the Modern House, Aug 25 – Sep 21, 1942
- Modern Architecture for the Modern School, Sep 16–30, 1942, with Rudolf Mock
- Look at Your Neighborhood, Mar 29 – Jun 25, 1944, with Rudolf Mock and Clarence Stein
- America Builds, 1944, with G. Holmes Perkins
- Built in U.S.A., 1944
  - Exhibition catalog Built in USA: 1932–1944 Edited by Elizabeth Mock, 1944
- Building with Wood, Nov 15, 1944 – Feb 18, 1945
- Integrated Building: Kitchens, Bathrooms, Storage, with Suzanne Wasson Tucker and Greta Daniel, Feb 21 – May 13, 1945
- A New Country House by Frank Lloyd Wright, Jun 18 – Sep 3, 1946
