= William Wurster =

American architect and educator (1895–1973)

William Wilson Wurster
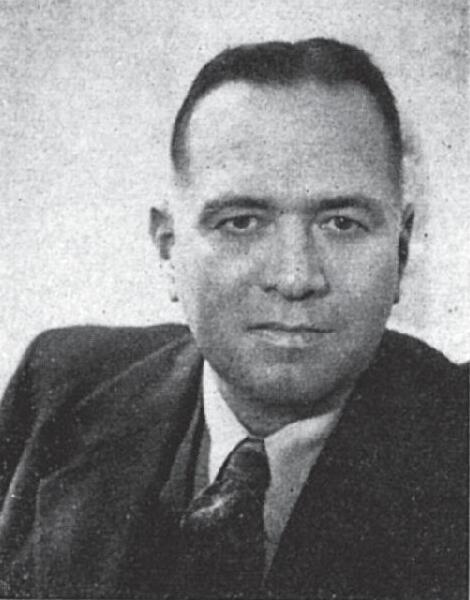
- Wurster c. 1945
- Born: October 20, 1895; Stockton, California, U.S.
- Died: September 19, 1973 (aged 77); Berkeley, California, U.S.
- Education: University of California, Berkeley (1919)
- Occupation: Architect
- Spouse: Catherine Bauer Wurster
- Children: 1 daughter
- Practice: Wurster, Bernardi & Emmons (WBE)
- Buildings: 555 California Street; Ghirardelli Square; CASBS

William Wilson Wurster (October 20, 1895 – September 19, 1973) was an American architect and architectural teacher at the University of California, Berkeley, and at the Massachusetts Institute of Technology, best known for his residential designs in California.

== Early life and education ==
Wurster was born on October 20, 1895, in Stockton, California. His family encouraged him to observe, read and draw but Wurster often admitted later in life, to holding more of an intellectual gift, rather than a drawing gift. As a child, he held a close relationship with his father, a banker who, on bank holidays and weekends, would take Wurster to observe the life of the town to show him how it functioned. This, Wurster later reflected, was to show him the workings, rather than the structures of the city.

During his years at Stockton Public High School, Wurster worked in the office of Edgar B. Brown, an Englishman known for designing the Stockton Hotel and the Children's Home of Stockton, who was often regarded as one of Stockton's most influential architects. While there, he acted as an office boy, drawing plans, making measured drawings and doing the blueprinting, allowing his early interests in architecture.

Once graduating from high school in 1912, Wurster's parents strongly believed he should acquire a university education and encouraged him to attend the architecture school at the University of California, Berkeley, which was headed, at the time, by founding director and renowned architect John Galen Howard. Wurster enrolled at the university in 1913, receiving a classical Beaux Arts education from notable Berkeley teachers such as Warren Perry and William Hays. While there, Wurster joined the Sigma Chi fraternity, where he was taught both to get on with people and express himself.

When a physical ailment kept Wurster from voluntary military service in World War I, he studied marine engineering at the University of California, Berkeley and joined the merchant marine in 1918. In 1919, once he had completed a year's tour of duty in the South Pacific, he returned to the University to graduate with honors in architecture.

== Career ==
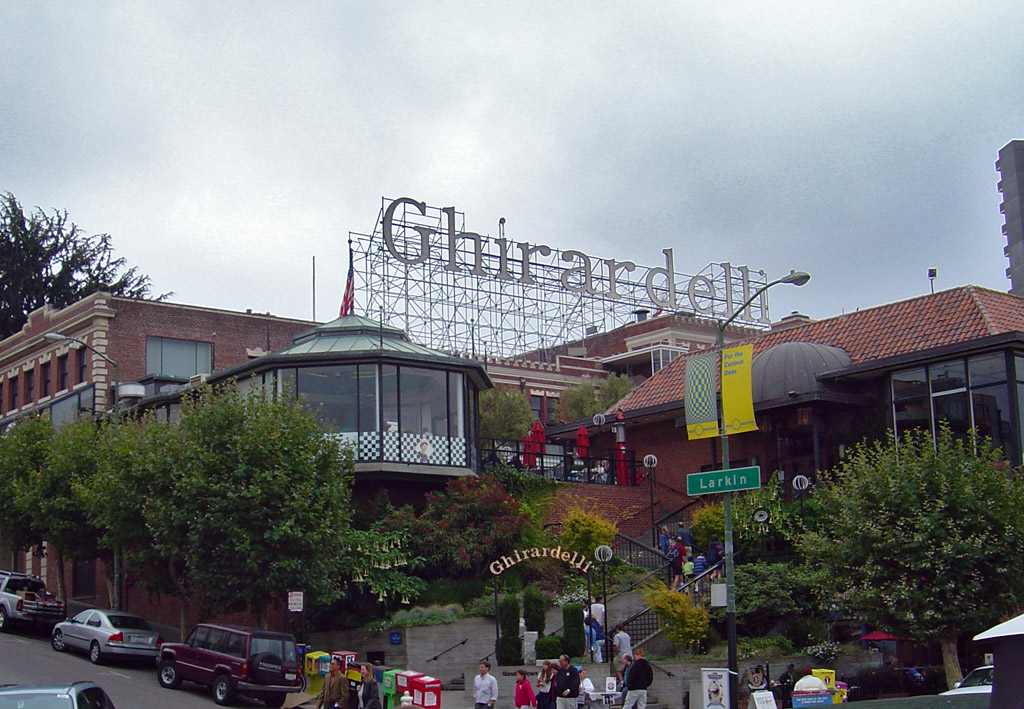
Ghirardelli Square, San Francisco. Wurster's firm, along with Lawrence Halprin, were responsible for developing the conceptual re-use plan for the Square in the early 1960s.

Following his graduation, Wurster briefly apprenticed in the office of John W. Reid Jr., a San Francisco architect who worked mainly on schools, before Wurster became the architectural designer for Charles Dean in 1920. For the next two years, he worked designing the city of Sacramento's water filtration plant. During this time, he also worked independently, designing several small residences. In April 1922, he became a registered architect within California. Following this, Wurster embarked on a tour of Europe, where he encountered art and design he had previously only known through books, before returning to the United States in 1923 and heading to New York where he joined the office of Delano and Aldrich, who were known for their work on the John D. Rockefeller Estate at Pocantico Hills and Otto Kahn's château at Cold Spring Harbor. In 1924 William Adams Delano lent Wurster money to open his own office and he returned to the Bay Area to open it in the Hotel Whitecotton in Berkeley.

Wurster remained strongly associated, throughout his forty-five year career, with the Bay Area and its regional style, along with Wurster's mentor Bernard Maybeck, the landscape architect Thomas Church, and fellow architect Joseph Esherick. Wurster designed hundreds of California houses in the 1920s through the 1940s using indigenous materials and a direct, simple style suited to the climate. His 1928 Gregory Farmhouse in Scotts Valley, California is regarded as the prototypical ranch-style house, and a direct influence on the subsequent development of the Northwest Regional style of John Yeon and Pietro Belluschi. In 1930, Wurster hired his first long-term employee, Floyd Comstock, setting the trend of the Wurster office serving as the training ground of many generations of architects who worked within the firm during its life.

In 1940, Wurster married Catherine Bauer, an influential figure in her own right in the field of public housing. He had met Bauer earlier that year while she was teaching at the University of California Berkeley on January 21,1940 at the home of Alice Griffith, a member of the San Francisco Housing Commission.

Wurster's graduate studies at Harvard were interrupted when he was appointed dean of the architectural and planning school at Massachusetts Institute of Technology in 1945, a position he held for five years. During 1949 and 1950, he simultaneously held the chair of the National Park and Planning Commission. Both Bauer and Wurster withstood accusations of disloyalty from the California Tenney Committee during the Red Scare of the late 1940s.

Also in 1945, Wurster co-founded the firm Wurster, Bernardi & Emmons (WBE) with Theodore Bernardi and Donn Emmons. In 1950, he was named dean of the UC Berkeley Architecture school. In 1959, he orchestrated the creation of the UC Berkeley College of Environmental Design, which brought the three schools of architecture, landscape architecture and urban planning into one organization. He served as its dean until his retirement in 1963 for health reasons.

== Bauer Wurster Hall ==
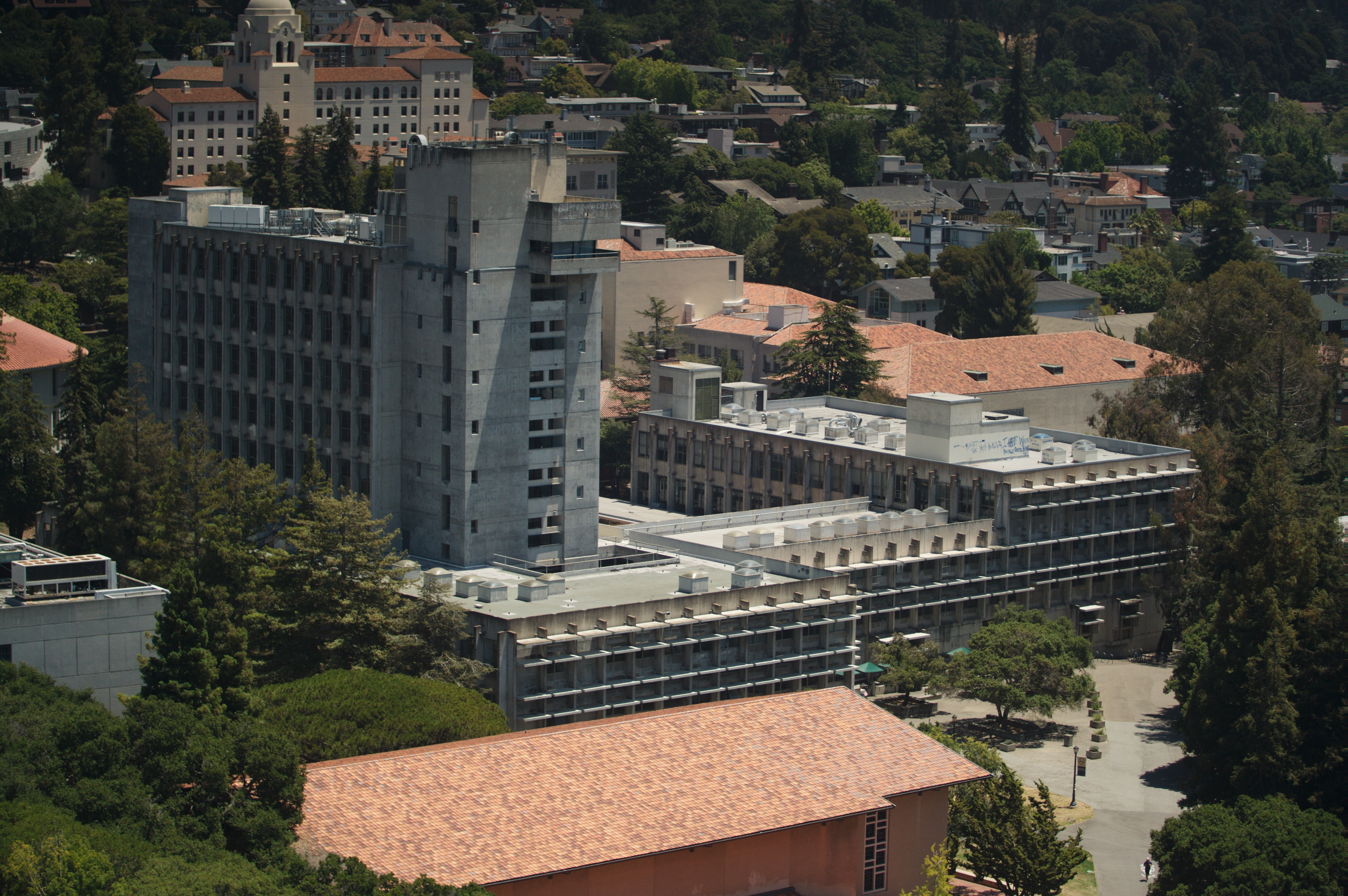
Bauer Wurster Hall, photographed in 2016.

Bauer Wurster Hall was completed in 1964 on the Berkeley campus, designed by faculty members Joseph Esherick, Vernon DeMars, and Donald Olsen; Bauer Wurster Hall, in which the college is housed, is named in his and his wife's honor. It was originally named Wurster Hall, and renamed Bauer Wurster Hall in December 2020.

== Death, honors, and legacy ==
Wurster died on September 19, 1973, from complications of Parkinson's disease.

Architectural photographer Morley Baer was one of Wurster's many colleagues during his long career. He and Baer had a lifelong professional association and personal friendship. Wurster sold his first house in Berkeley's Greenwood Common to Baer, and he also designed a house/studio for Baer on the cliffs of Garrapata State Park south of Carmel-by-the-Sea, California.

Among Wurster's students was the award-winning architect John Desmond in Baton Rouge, Louisiana. Jim Webb, who taught at the University of North Carolina and was an influential architect in Chapel Hill, worked with Wurster for a while.

Wurster was elected a Fellow of the American Institute of Architects (AIA) in 1954. WBE received the AIA's third Architecture Firm Award in 1965, and he personally was awarded the AIA Gold Medal for Lifetime Achievement in 1969.

The Online Archive of California that comprises materials pertaining to the life and professional journey of architect William Wilson Wurster (1895-1973) and the architectural firm Wurster, Bernardi & Emmons. The archive documents Wurster's cooperative partnerships, professional affiliations, and accomplishments, along with projects undertaken by both Wurster and the firm. The assortment encompasses correspondence, reports, photographs, clippings, scrapbooks, and drawings. The collection encompasses an array of structures, including residential and commercial buildings, as well as expansive planning undertakings like defense housing. Additionally, the archive contains drawings by landscape architect Thomas Church and photographs contributed by Roger Sturtevant for select projects.

== Work ==
=== Educational ===
- Center for Advanced Study in the Behavioral Sciences at Stanford University, 1954
- Gamma Phi Beta, House] (Eta Chapter), University of California, Berkeley campus, 1932
- Stern Hall, University of California, Berkeley campus, 1942
- Campus Master Plan for University of Victoria, Canada 1962

=== Civic ===
- Influential adaptive reuse redevelopment of Ghirardelli Square, San Francisco, 1964 (with landscape architect Lawrence Halprin)
- Golden Gateway Complex, San Francisco, California, 1967 (with Sasaki, Walker & Associates; Demars and Reay)
- 555 California Street, San Francisco, California, 1969 (with Skidmore, Owings and Merrill and Pietro Belluschi)

=== Residential ===
- William Wurster Residence, 1850 Shuey Ave, Walnut Creek, California, 1941
- Case Study House #3, with Theodore Bernardi, Los Angeles, 1949
- Character Residential home communities in the Pasatiempo area outside Santa Cruz, California.
- Valencia Gardens public housing project, San Francisco, 1945, razed 2004

=== Religious ===
- Consulting architect for the Temple Emanu-El, Dallas, Texas, 1957
- First Unitarian Church of Berkeley, with Theodore Bernardi, 1961

== Readings ==
- Gregory, Daniel, "William W. Wurster," Toward a Simpler Way of Life: The Arts & Crafts Architects of California (Robert Winter, editor) Norfleet Press Book/University of California Press, Berkeley, Los Angeles London, 1997, pp. 245–254.
- Treib, Mark (1995). An Everyday Modernism: The Houses of William Wurster. San Francisco, California: University of California Press. ISBN 9780520205505.
