= Donald P. Olsen =

American violinist, educator and painter

Donald Penrod Olsen
- Born: December 3, 1910; Provo, Utah, U.S.
- Died: 1983 (aged 72–73); Salt Lake City, Utah, U.S.
- Education: Brigham Young University; University of Utah
- Occupations: Violinist, educator, painter

Donald P. Olsen (December 3, 1910 - 1983) was an American violinist, educator and painter. He played the violin for the Utah Symphony in the 1930s, he taught art and music at Jordan High School in Sandy, Utah, and he became an abstract expressionist painter in the 1950s. Olsen died in 1983 in Salt Lake City, and his work was exhibited posthumously at the Utah Museum of Fine Arts in 2011.

== Early life and education ==
Olsen was born in Provo, Utah, on December 3, 1910. He completed his undergraduate studies at Brigham Young University in 1935, focusing on music. He later pursued further education in art at the University of Utah in 1950.

== Teaching career ==
After his studies, Olsen taught at several high schools in Utah, including Provo, Lincoln, and Jordan High Schools. He also served as an instructor at the College of Southern Utah, teaching both music and art, and at the Art Barn in Salt Lake City. Olsen's student's include the artists Bart J. Morse and Donna Mae Peters Nunley.

== Artistic Contributions ==
Olsen is among the second generation of Utah modernists. His dedication to modernism led him to explore various contemporary styles, including abstract expressionism and minimalism. In 1955, he held a solo exhibition at the Salt Lake Art Center. Later in his career, Olsen's work evolved toward geometric purism, drawing inspiration from artists like Piet Mondrian.

In 1954, Olsen studied under Hans Hofmann in Provincetown, Massachusetts, which influenced his artistic development. He frequently visited New York, engaging with prominent abstract expressionist painters of the time, and then brought that new ideology back to Utah.

== Artistic philosophy ==
Olsen's philosophy of painting emphasized the authenticity of the medium. He believed that a painting should be true to itself, not simulating or borrowing from external realities, but expressing the internal vision of the artist. “Painting is not an illusion. A painting can only be itself; it does not simulate, borrow from, or pretend to be anything outside itself. It is a real thing and its reality lies in being itself. A painting reveals the internal expression of the artist and has nothing to do with observation of visual facts.“
