= Roger Montgomery (architect) =

American architect

Roger Montgomery (1925–2003) was an American architect, and Professor at Washington University in St. Louis and University of California, Berkeley.

== Early life and education ==
Roger Montgomery was born in New York City to parents Graham Livingston Montgomery and Anne Cook and lived in Greenwich Village until 1930, when he moved to Port Washington, Long Island. In 1945, he was accepted into the United States Army, where he served in an intelligence unit in occupied Germany as a radio operator.

He attended a John Dewey-influenced grade school in Port Washington. In high school he was voted ‘Most Likely to Succeed’ and ‘The Great Orator’. He was excused from military service in 1941 because of a punctured eardrum and subsequently enrolled in Oberlin College, but was dismissed from the college in 1945. Montgomery began his architectural work in 1948 as an apprentice in Springfield, Ohio and was soon successful, in part because of a shortage of architects and large post-war boom in construction. From 1955 to 1956, he attended the Harvard Graduate School of Design where he received a Masters of Architecture degree under professors Josep Lluís Sert and Sigfried Giedion, while studying with classmates Fumihiko Maki and Ben Weese.

== Career ==
- 1957: Began position as professor of architecture at Sam Fox School of Design & Visual Arts at Washington University in St. Louis. Also named founding Director (1957–1963) of the Landmarks Association of St. Louis, one of the nation's first building and neighborhood preservation groups.
- 1960: Started the architectural practice of Schnebli, Anselevicius, and Montgomery (SAM) that designed the Washington University Law School Building in 1972. Founded the Urban Design Program at Washington University with Fumihiko Maki
- 1961: Worked for the Kennedy Administration as the first Urban Design Officer in the Federal Housing and Home Finance Agency (later HUD).
- 1964: Named founding Director of Washington University's Urban Renewal Design Center and planned and designed ‘Towne South’, a community outside of St. Louis
- 1965: Named founding Director of the Urban Housing Foundation, Inc. (1965–1967).
- 1967: Hired as a professor with joint appointment in both the departments of City & Regional Planning, and of Architecture, at the University of California, Berkeley.
- 1968: Named a juror from the Progressive Architecture P/A Design Awards.
- 1967-72: Served as west coast editor for Architecture Forum magazine.
- 1973: Published Housing in America (co-authored with Daniel Mandelker), a survey of housing economics, race, and land use issues. Also published A Guide to Architecture in San Francisco and Northern California (co-authored with David Gebhard and Sally Woodbridge).
- 1977: Published a guide to the architecture and vernacular buildings of Washington State, titled A guide to architecture in Washington State: an environmental perspective.
- 1980s: During this period Montgomery served as President of the California Council of Architectural Education, and the National Board of Architects, Designers and Planners for Social Responsibility. Additionally, he served on boards for a number of voluntary organizations related to the design professions including Planners for Equal Opportunity, Planners Network and Northern California Non-Profit Housing Coalition. In the Bay Area, Montgomery advised City and County boards in Berkeley, Alameda County, Santa Clara and San Francisco. Montgomery was also named Associate Dean for Undergraduate Affairs and later Acting Dean.
- May 1, 1989: Named Dean of the College of Environmental Design, University of California, Berkeley, a position he holds until January 1996. During 1989, Montgomery was named to the Board of Trustees of the Berkeley Art Museum, a position he holds until 2002.

== Personal life ==
Montgomery married Oberlin College graduate Mary Hoyt. They had four sons.

He died of cancer on October 25, 2003.
