= Charles M. Eastman =

American architect

Charles (Chuck) M. Eastman (May 5, 1940 – November 9, 2020) was a professor and a pioneer in the areas of design cognition, building information modeling (BIM), solid and parametric modeling, engineering databases, product models, and interoperability. He is best known for his work on building description system, which later gave him a title as the 'father of BIM.'

== Biography ==
Eastman was a pioneer of computer-aided design for the architecture, engineering, construction, and operation (AECO) industry, developing research 3D and early solid and parametric modeling systems for the building industry starting in the mid-1970s. Trained as an architect at the UC Berkeley College of Environmental Design, he focused on tool development for practitioners with the 'building description system (BDS)' and 'Building Product Modeling,' later re-branded as 'Building Information Modeling (BIM).' He was a founder of ACADIA (the Association for Computer-Aided Design in Architecture) and CIB W78 Information Technology for Construction. CIB W78 created the Charles M. Eastman Top Ph.D. Paper Award in his honor. He served as an editorial board member of major journals including Research in Engineering Design, Automation in Construction, Computer-Aided Design, Design Studies, and Journal of Information Technology in Construction.

He taught briefly at the University of Wisconsin and, then, at Carnegie Mellon University (1967–1982), UCLA (1987–1995), and Georgia Tech (1996–2018). In 1969, he published the paper "Cognitive processes and ill-defined problems: A case study from design", which is regarded as the first paper in the area of design cognition. At Carnegie Mellon University, he was jointly appointed a professor of the faculty of architecture and the faculty of the School of Public Policy (the Heinz School). He started the PhD program in Architecture there. While at CMU, he headed up the GLIDE (Graphical Language for Interactive Design) program, a research project for the Army Corps of Engineers, a polygonal, solid-modeling system implemented as an extension to interpretive Pascal. He founded a parametric modeling start-up (called Formtek) in 1982 and sold the company to Lockheed Martin in 1987 before he joined University of California, Los Angeles, where he was for eight years. In 1996, he moved to Georgia Tech and worked there as a professor in the Colleges of Design and Computer Science at Georgia Institute of Technology and the director of the Georgia Tech Digital Building Lab (DBL) until his retirement in 2018.

His research group at Georgia Tech worked with industry groups to develop new generation parametric modeling tools including Tekla Structures and the courthouse BIM tools, and BIM exchange standards including improved IFC semantic foundations. His research partners included the Precast/Prestressed Concrete Institute, the Charles Pankow Foundation, General Services Administration (GSA), the American Institute of Steel Construction, the American Concrete Institute, and the National Institute of Standards and Technology.

== Awards ==
- Design Intelligence 30 Most admired Educators for 2014, Design Intelligence
- Best Paper Award for the “Relative productivity of Onsite and Offsite Construction Activities” paper in the ASCE Journal of Construction Engineering and management (best of 186 papers in 2008)
- 2006 Open Data Award from BuildingSMART. For CIS/2, Washington DC, November, 2006
- Lifetime Research Achievement Award, Bentley Systems International Conference, October, 2000

== Books ==
- Sacks, R., Eastman, C., Lee, G., & Teicholz, P. (2018). BIM handbook 3rd edition: a guide to building information modeling for owners, managers, designers, engineers, and contractors. Wiley.
- Eastman, C. Teicholz, P., Sacks, R., & Liston, K. (2011). BIM handbook 2nd edition: a guide to building information modeling for owners, managers, designers, engineers, and contractors. Wiley.
- Eastman, C. Teicholz, P., Sacks, R., & Liston, K. (2008). BIM handbook 1st edition: a guide to building information modeling for owners, managers, designers, engineers, and contractors. Wiley.
- Eastman, C. M. (1999). Building product models: computer environments, supporting design and construction. CRC press.
- Eastman, C., Newstetter, W., & McCracken, M. (Eds.). (2001). Design Knowing and Learning: Cognition in Design Education: Cognition in Design Education. Elsevier.
- Augenbroe, G., Eastman C. (Eds.). (1999). Computers in Building: Proceedings of the CAADfutures'99 Conference: Proceedings of the 8th International Conference on Computer Aided Architectural Design Futures. Atlanta, Georgia, USA on June 7–8, 1999. Kluwer Academic Publishers.
- Dasu, S., Eastman, C. (Eds.). (1994). Management of Design: Engineering and Management Perspectives. Springer.
