= Nezar AlSayyad =

American architect and academic (born 1956)

- Born: October 10, 1956 (age 70); Cairo
- Years active: 2006—present

Academic background
- Education: Ph.D. in architecture, M.S. in architecture, B.S. in architectural engineering

Academic work
- Discipline: Architect, planner, urban designer, urban historian
- Website: www.nezaralsayyad.com

Nezar Al Sayyad (born October 10, 1956) is an architect, city planner, urban designer, urban historian, and professor emeritus at the University of California Berkeley in the College of Environmental Design, where he received the Distinguished Teaching Award. Educated as an architect, planner, and urban historian, AlSayyad is principally an urbanist whose specialty is the study of cities, their urban forms and spaces, and their impact on their social and cultural realities. As a scholar, AlSayyad has written and edited several books on colonialism, identity, Islamic architecture, tourism, tradition, urbanism, urban design, urban history, urban informality, and virtuality.

== Career ==
In 1988, AlSayyad co-founded the International Association for the Study of Traditional Environments (IASTE), a scholarly association concerned with the study of indigenous vernacular and popular built environments around the world. In the same year he founded the area of Environmental Design and Urbanism in Developing Countries (EDUDC), an interdisciplinary area of research that connects history, theory, social processes, and design at both the undergraduate and graduate levels in the College of Environmental Design at the University of California, Berkeley. As an academic advisor, AlSayyad has worked with more than 50 PhD students in both architecture and planning in addition to supervising more than a hundred M.Arch, MCP and MUD theses during his 33-year career at Berkeley.

AlSayyad has also produced and co-directed two public television video documentaries: Virtual Cairo and At Home with Mother Earth. He has received grants from the U.S. Department of Education, NEA—Design Arts Program, Getty Grant Program, the Graham Foundation, the SSRC, and a Guggenheim fellowship. His awards include the Beit Al-Quran Medal from Bahrain, the Pioneer American Society Book Award, and the American Institute of Architects Education Honors. AlSayyad maintains a small architecture and urban design practice XXA- The Office of Xross-Xultural Architecture which provides design and consulting work to various clients in the US and several developing countries. AlSayyad has been invited as a visiting professor and as a lecturer in more than 40 countries.

AlSayyad is the president of the International Association for the Study of Traditional Environments (IASTE), and faculty director of the Center for Arab Societies and Environments Studies (CASES). He is a member of the Urban Design Graduate Group (MUD) and the Global Studies Graduate Group. For almost two decades AlSayyad also chaired the Center for Middle Eastern Studies at Berkeley.

=== Academic biography and education ===
Nezar AlSayyad was born in Cairo, Egypt, to a family of educators. His father was a well-known geographer, poet and an intellectual in Egypt. As a child AlSayyad enjoyed reading and learning. His other interest was in building with his hands, creating designs and analyzing architectural and city forms. Having spent a year in Norman, Oklahoma as a child, AlSayyad decided to return and make his life in the US. Following his graduation from high school, AlSayyad joined Cairo University where he excelled as both an undergraduate and graduate student obtaining his Bachelor of Architectural Engineering in 1977 and his Higher Diploma - Town Planning in 1979.

In 1981, AlSayyad finished his M.S. in architecture at the Massachusetts Institute of Technology (MIT). He then went on to work for Yamasaki & Associates, architects of the World Trade Center, before accepting his first professorial position at the King Fahd University of Petroleum and Minerals (UPM) in Dhahran, Saudi Arabia. After publishing his first book, AlSayyad was invited by the architectural historian Spiro Kostof to join Berkeley to pursue a PhD in architectural and urban history. AlSayyad worked as a lecturer in the Department of City and Regional Planning in the same college. By the time of his PhD completion in 1988, AlSayyad had established the International Association for the Study of Traditional Environments (IASTE) where he served and still serves as the president and chief editor of the Association's peer-reviewed journal Traditional Dwellings and Settlements Review.

=== Sexual misconduct allegations ===
In 2016, an investigation into sexual harassment allegations by a PhD student in the architecture department at the University of California, Berkeley led to a partial suspension of AlSayyad's teaching duties. AlSayyad denied wrongdoing. In 2018, that investigation resulted in AlSayyad's suspension from Berkeley for three years. Rather than serve the suspension, AlSayyad elected to retire, but has also sued the university, claiming that Chancellor Carol T. Christ overstepped her authority in determining his punishment.

== Books ==
- Whose Tradition?. Co-edited with Mark Gillem and David Moffat. Routledge: London, 2017.
- Traditions: The Real, the Hyper, and the Virtual in the Built Environment. Routledge: London, 2014.
- Cairo: Histories of a City. Harvard University Press: Cambridge, 2011.
- The Fundamentalist City? Co-edited with Mejgan Massoumi. Routledge: London, 2010.
- Cinematic Urbanism: A History of the Modern From Reel to Real. Routledge: London & New York, 2006.
- Making Cairo Medieval. Co-edited with Irene Bierman and Nasser Rabbat. Lexington Books: Lanham & London, 2005.
- Müslüman Avrupa ya da Avro-Islam. Co-edited with Manuel Castells. Istanbul: Everest, 2004 (In Turkish).
- The End of Tradition? Editor. Routledge: London & New York, 2003.
- Urban Informality: Transnational Perspectives from the Middle East, Latin America and South Asia. Co-edited with Ananya Roy. Lexington Books: Lanham and London, 2003.
- Europa Musulmana O Euro-Islam. Barcelona: Alianza Editorial/Ensayo, 2003 (In Spanish).
- Muslim Europe or Euro-Islam. Co-edited with Manuel Castells. Lexington Books: Lanham and London, 2002.
- Consuming Tradition/Manufacturing Heritage: Global Norms and Urban Forms in an Age of Tourism. Routledge: London, New York, 2001.
- Hybrid Urbanism: On the Identity Discourse and the Built Environment. Greenwood/Praeger: New York and Westport, 2001.
- Al Mudun fi Sadr al-Islam: The Early Cities of Islam. Beit Al-Quran: Bahrain, 1996 (in Arabic).
- Forms of Dominance: On the Architecture and Urbanism of the Colonial Enterprise. Editor. Avebury: London and Aldershot, 1992.
- Cities and Caliphs: On the Genesis of Arab Muslim Urbanism. Greenwood Press: New York, Westport, and London, 1991.
- Dwellings, Settlements and Tradition. Co-edited with Jean-Paul Bourdier. University Press of America: New York, Lanham, and London, 1989.
- The Design and Planning of Housing. Editor. UPM Press: Dhahran & Houston, 1984.
- Streets of Islamic Cairo; A Configuration of Urban Themes and Patterns. Harvard University and Massachusetts Institute of Technology, AKP: Cambridge, 1981.

=== Books pending publication ===
- Nile: Urban Histories on the Banks of a River. Harvard University Press: Cambridge, publication scheduled for 2017.
- Architecture's Poverty. Routledge: London, publication scheduled for 2017.
