= Catherine Bauer Wurster =

American public housing advocate and educator

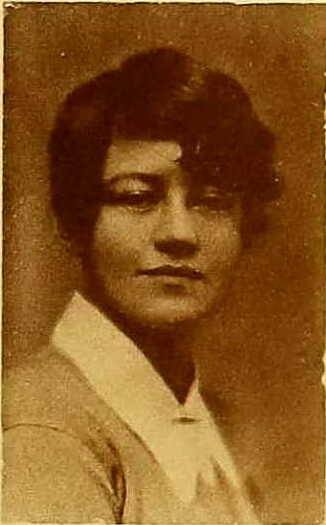
- Bauer in 1926
- Born: May 11, 1905; Elizabeth, New Jersey, U.S.
- Died: November 21, 1964 (aged 59); Mount Tamalpais, Marin County, California, U.S.
- Spouse: William Wurster
- Children: One daughter

Catherine Krouse Bauer Wurster (May 11, 1905 – November 21, 1964) was an American public housing advocate and educator of city planners and urban planners. A leading member of the "housers," a group of planners who advocated affordable housing for low-income families, she dramatically changed social housing practice and law in the United States. Wurster's influential book Modern Housing was published by Houghton Mifflin Company in 1934 and is regarded as a classic in the field.

== Early life ==
On May 11, 1905, Catherine Krouse Bauer was born in Elizabeth, New Jersey to Alberta Krouse Bauer, a self-educated homemaker, and Jacob Bauer. Her father, a state highway engineer, was an early advocate of superhighways and implemented the first cloverleaf interchanges in America while serving as New Jersey's Chief Highway Engineer. Bauer's younger sister was Elizabeth Bauer Mock, a curator and Director of the Department of Architecture and Design at the Museum of Modern Art (MoMA) and her brother was Jacob Louis Bauer Jr., an engineer. She married and had 1 child.

Bauer completed her secondary education at the Vail-Deane School in her hometown. She first attended Vassar College, spent one year as an architecture student at Cornell University, then transferred back to Vassar College from which she received her undergraduate degree in 1926.

In 1926–1927, Bauer spent time in Paris, where she befriended Fernand Léger, Man Ray, and Sylvia Beach. Inspired by the city planning vision advanced by French architect Le Corbusier, Bauer published an article on his worker's apartments in suburban Paris.

== Professional career ==
Returning to New York City in 1927, Bauer worked at a number of publishing houses, eventually collaborating with American urban critic Lewis Mumford beginning in the late 1920s. It was at his urging that she became involved with the architects of change in post-World War I Europe, among them Ernst May, André Lurçat, and Walter Gropius. Convinced that good social housing could produce good social architecture, and moved by the visible ravages of the Depression, she became a passionate leader in the fight for housing for the poor and in 1934 accepted an appointment by the American Federation of Labor (AFL) to become Executive Director of the new Labor Housing Conference based in Philadelphia. Her book Modern Housing (1934) described the housing achievements Bauer had observed in Europe and lessons for the United States capturing attention of New Deal policy-makers who wanted to boost the economy through housing construction. In 1936 she was awarded a Guggenheim Fellowship to study housing in Europe and the USSR.

Bauer was the primary author of the Housing Act of 1937 and advised five presidents on housing and urban planning strategies. Following the passage of the Housing Act of 1937, she was named the Director of Information and Research for the newly formed United States Housing Authority, a federal agency of the Department of the Interior under the New Deal. She served as consultant and adviser to national, state, and local housing and planning agencies during the 1930s-1960s including the Federal Housing Administration, the Housing and Home Finance Agency, and the California Housing and Planning Association. Bauer was instrumental in the creation of the influential documentary film The City, which was included in the 1939 New York World's Fair.

In 1940, Bauer accepted a position as Visiting Lecturer at the University of California, Berkeley's School of Social Welfare. During the 1940s-1950s she lectured and led seminars at Harvard University, Cornell University, Mills College, and University of Wisconsin, and in 1950 joined the department of architecture at University of California, Berkeley. After her marriage to San Francisco area architect William Wurster, whom she met while teaching at UC Berkeley in 1940, both withstood accusations of disloyalty by the Tenney Committee during the Red Scare of the 1950s. Bauer Wurster contributed to the establishment of University of California, Berkeley's UC Berkeley College of Environmental Design, contributed to the founding of the progressive architectural research group Telesis and served on the editorial board of the Telesis-affiliated publication, Task, a short-lived but influential architectural journal published during the 1940s.

She died in a fall during a solo hike on Mount Tamalpais, Marin County, California, on November 21, 1964.

== Legacy ==
A bust of Catherine Bauer Wurster is located in the Environmental Design Library at UC Berkeley. An Oscar Stonorov bust of Wurster adorns the Robert C. Weaver Federal Building's Main (South) lobby in Washington DC. The UC Berkeley College of Environmental Design's Catherine Bauer Wurster Award for Social Practice was established to recognize alumni who have made significant contributions in their professions. The building that houses the College of Environmental Design at Berkeley was renamed the Bauer Wurster Building in 2020 to clarify that it was named in honor of both William Wurster and Catherine Bauer Wurster. The lifetime achievement award of the Nonprofit Housing Association of Northern California is named after Bauer.

== Bibliography ==
- Bauer, Catherine (1934). Modern Housing. Cambridge: Riverside Press.
- Bauer Wurster, Catherine (March 1965). "The Social Front of Modern Architecture in the 1930s". Journal of the Society of Architectural Historians. 24 (1): 48–52. doi:10.2307/988280. JSTOR 988280.
