= Vernon DeMars =

American architect & professor (1908–2005)

Vernon Armond DeMars
- Born: February 26, 1908; San Francisco, California, U.S.
- Died: April 29, 2005 (aged 97); Oakland, California, U.S.
- Employer(s): DeMars & Reay, UC Berkeley College of Environmental Design
- Notable work: Wurster Hall
- Movement: Telesis, Second Bay Area Regional Style
- Spouse: Elizabeth "Betty" Bates DeMars (1910–1987; death)

Vernon Armond DeMars (February 26, 1908 – April 29, 2005) was an American architect and professor at the UC Berkeley College of Environmental Design. He specialized in Modernist housing projects and public housing complexes.

== Biography ==
Vernon Armond DeMars was born on February 26, 1908, in San Francisco.

As one of the principal members of the group Telesis founded in 1939, he helped develop what Lewis Mumford called, the Second Bay Area Regional Style. He, along with Joseph Esherick, designed Wurster Hall, Sproul Plaza and the Student Center at the University of California, Berkeley. While working as a visiting professor of architecture at the Massachusetts Institute of Technology (MIT), DeMars was part of a team that designed the 12-story Eastgate Apartments faculty housing project that Architectural Record magazine called one of the 50 most significant buildings in the United States of the past century. He later assisted his former MIT colleague Alvar Aalto in constructing the library at Mount Angel Abbey in Oregon.

DeMars, along with his architectural partner Donald Reay, taught at the UC Berkeley College of Environmental Design. The pair was involved with redevelopment work in Marin City, California, that won recognition from Progressive Architecture magazine in 1960.

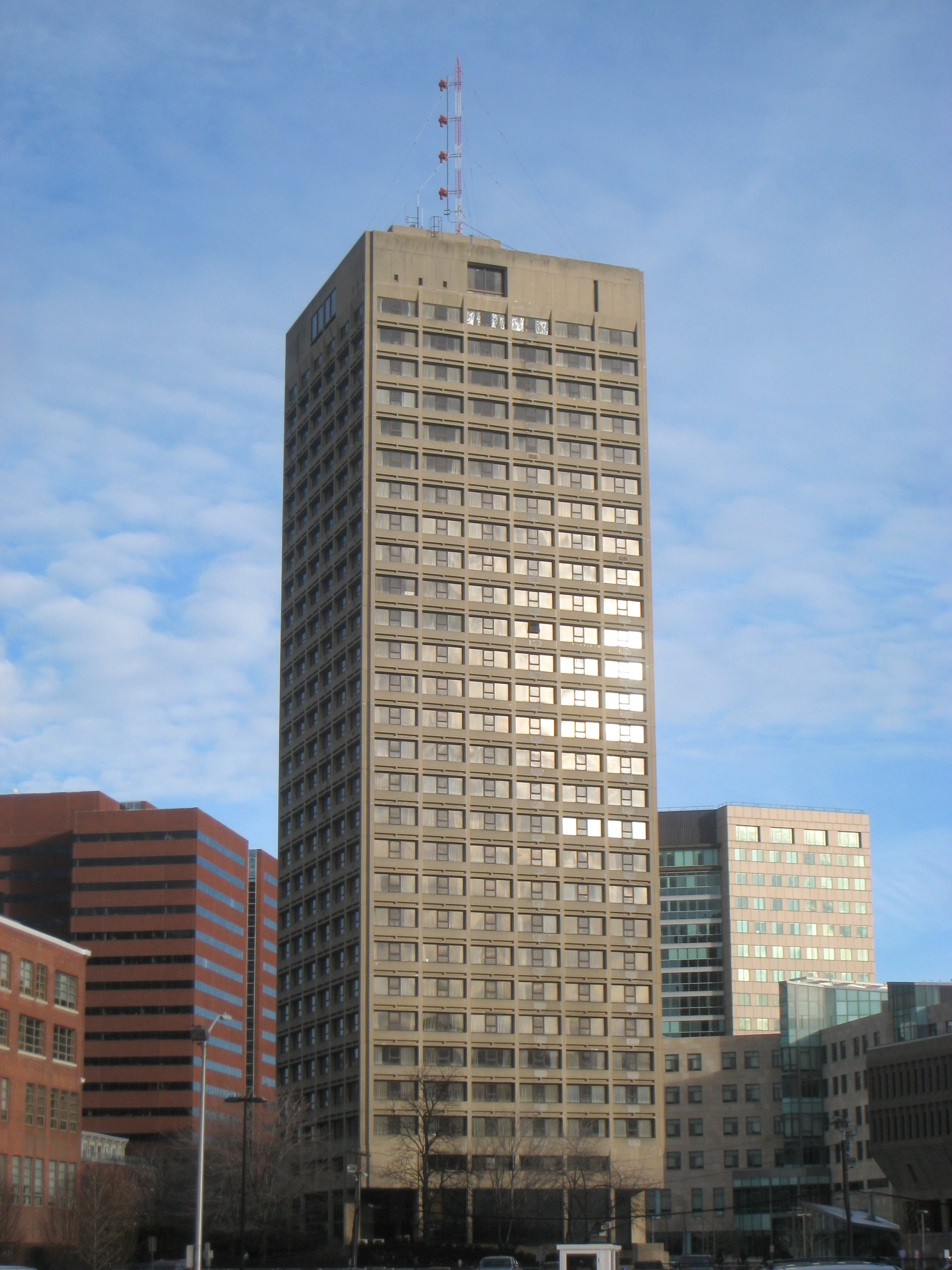
Eastgate Apartments, a former residence hall at the Massachusetts Institute of Technology

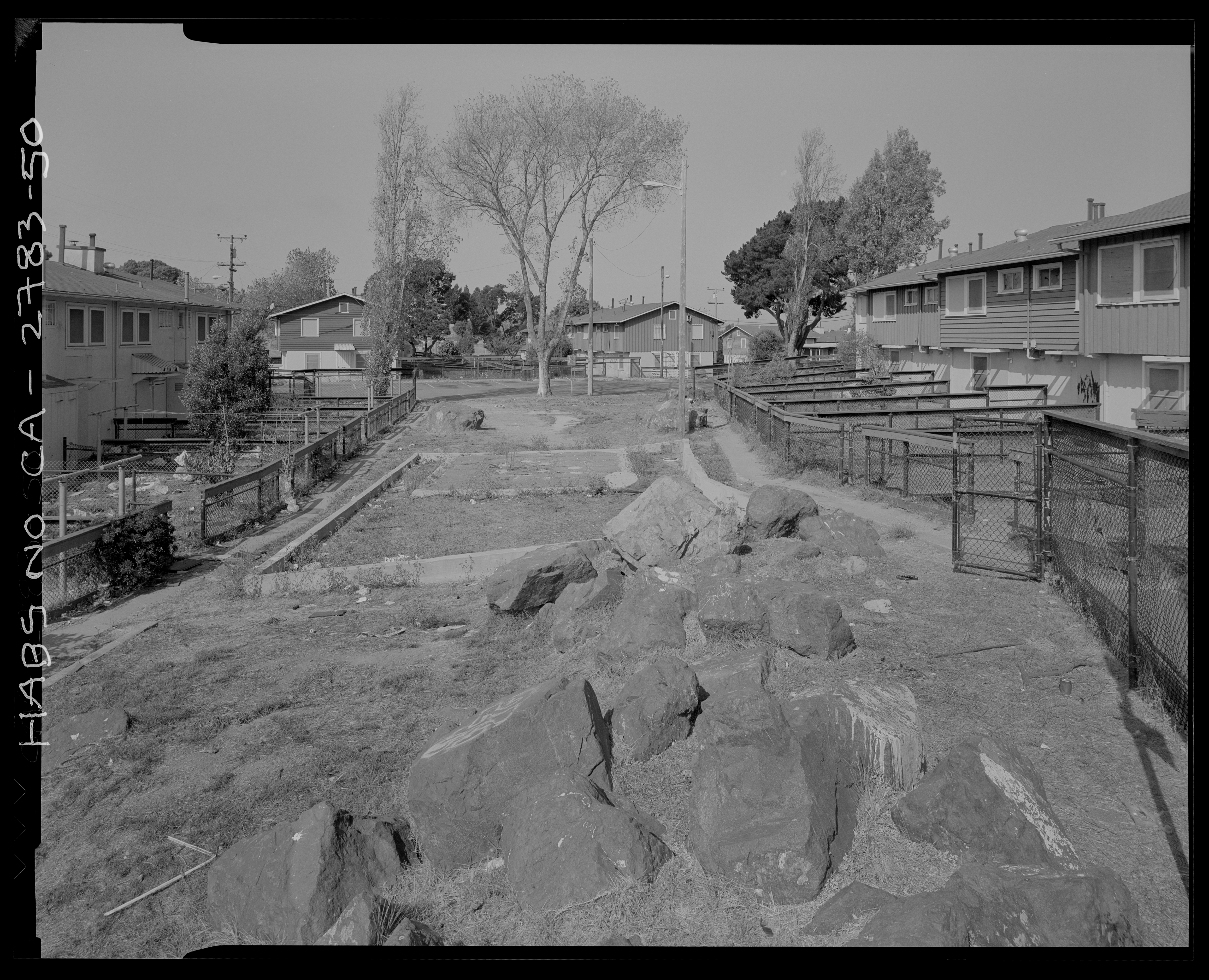
Former Easter Hill Village (now Richmond Village), Richmond, California
