= Shed style =

Style of architecture

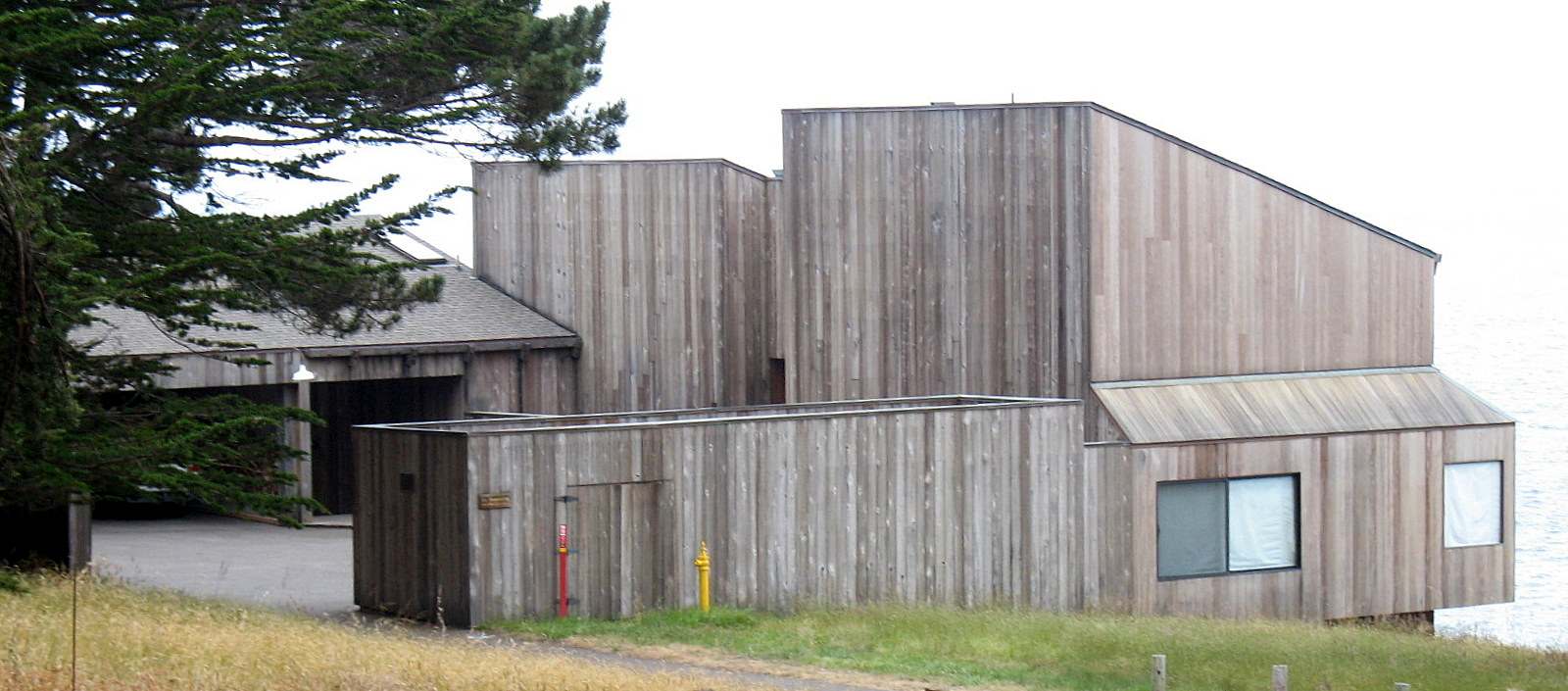
Condominium 1 at Sea Ranch, California, completed in 1965

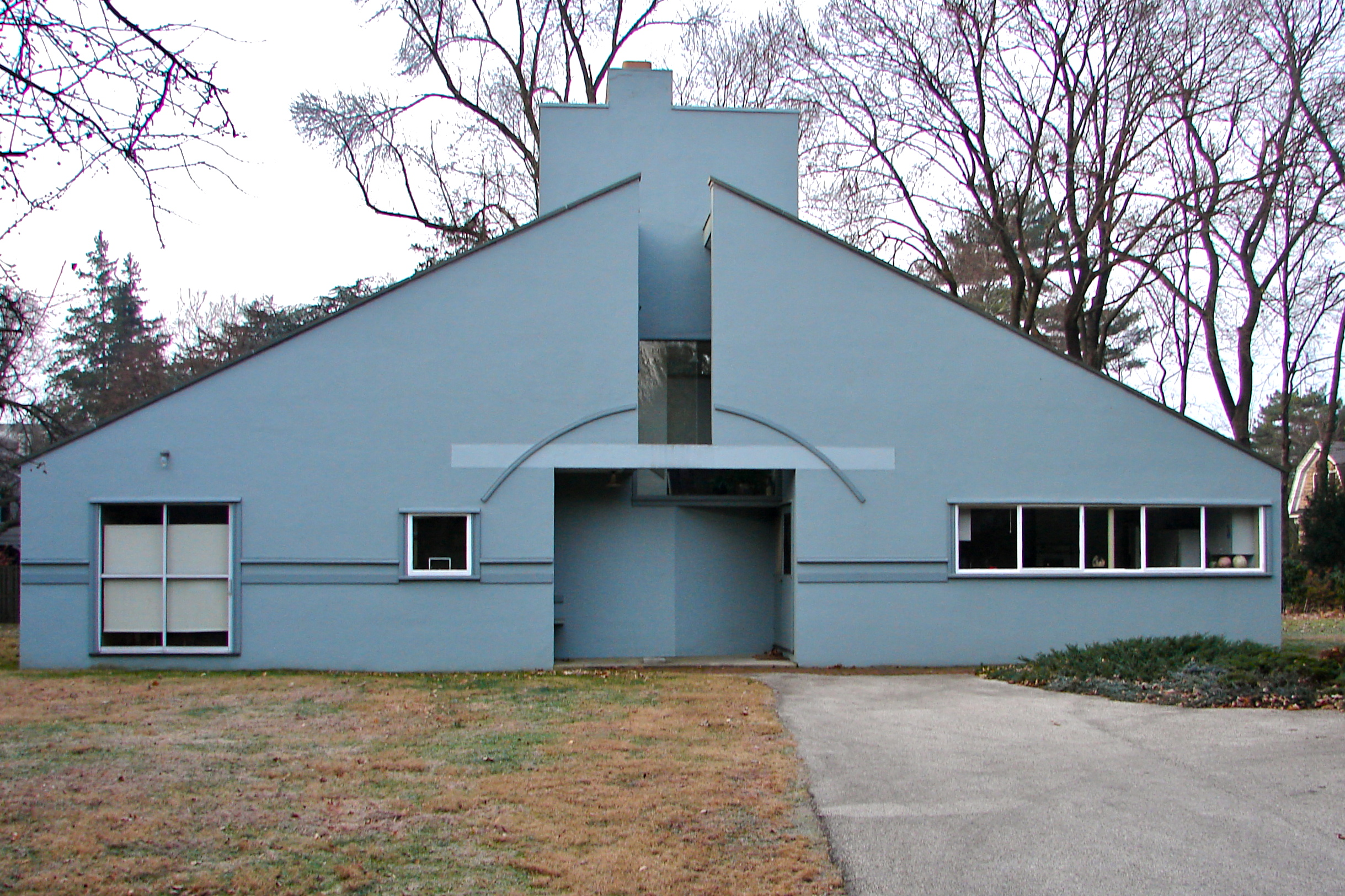
The Vanna Venturi House, one of the influences of the shed style (note the two shed roofs, rather than a single gable).

Shed style refers to a style of architecture that makes use of single-sloped roofs (commonly called "shed roofs").

The style originated from the designs of architects Charles Willard Moore and Robert Venturi in the 1960s. Their works were influential to the style that would include the Sea Ranch in California (Moore) and the Vanna Venturi House (Venturi). Shed style architecture became very popular in the 1970s and 1980s, but most shed style homes stopped being built after the mid to late 1980s, though, today, houses use some characteristics from the shed style houses.

== Characteristics ==
Common stylistic features of shed style include overall asymmetry with strong lines, one- to two-story height, and seamless roof and wall intersection. Exterior walls are commonly clad in wood boards laid horizontally, vertically or diagonally. Builder-designed examples often use textured plywood siding, while others have cedar shingles. Shed styles were developed in the early 1970s, however, they quickly died out in the 1980s because of the high maintenance costs they created.

== See also ==
- Postmodern architecture
