= Al Boeke =

American architect

Alfred Anton Boeke
- Born: November 20, 1922; Denver, Colorado, U.S.
- Died: November 8, 2011 (aged 88); Sea Ranch, California, U.S.
- Education: University of Southern California (Bachelor's degree in architecture)
- Occupations: Architect, developer
- Known for: Creating and developing Sea Ranch
- Spouse: Pamela Clarke Boeke
- Children: 2 sons
- Parent(s): Alfred and Adah Harris Boeke

Alfred Anton Boeke (November 20, 1922 – November 8, 2011) was an American architect and developer. Boeke created and developed Sea Ranch, California, a 10-mile-long planned coastal community of 1,700 homes in Sonoma County, California. Boeke advocated integration of the homes with the surrounding landscape, environmental preservation and low density development while creating Sea Ranch and his other planned communities. Boeke recruited some of the best-known 20th-century American architects to create Sea Ranch's wooden homes, which became well known in design and development circles.

== Biography ==
Boeke was born to Alfred and Adah Harris Boeke in Denver, Colorado, on November 20, 1922. His family relocated to Altadena, California, where Boeke was raised. Boeke earned a bachelor's degree in architecture from the University of Southern California in 1948. He worked for Richard Neutra, an influential, Los Angeles-based modernist architect during his early career.

Boeke was hired by Castle & Cooke, real estate company owned by the Dole Food Company, in 1959. Under Castle & Cooke, Boeke served as the development director of Mililani, Hawai'i, planned community of approximately 28,000 residents on Oahu.

Boeke first saw the land that would become Sea Ranch, California, in 1962 while on a scouting flight with a real estate specialist in Northern California. He was Vice President of Planning and Development at the time for Oceanic Properties, a division of Castle & Cooke, at the time. Boeke was reportedly impressed with the landscape and Gualala River which runs through the area. He had the pilot of the twin-engine Cessna make two to three passes over the ranch before proclaiming, "I don't want to look at anything else."

He envisioned a new community on the site based on the ideas of the new towns movement, which advocated the needs of residents over corporate profits and dense development which could lead to congestion. Boeke persuaded Oceanic Properties to purchase Del Mar Ranch, the 5,200-acre coastal sheep ranch where the community of Sea Ranch now stands. The company purchased the land for $2.3 million, which is less than $500 per acre. Boeke envisioned the new town, called Sea Ranch as an affordable alternative to high density development for middle and upper-middle class homeowners.

== Sea Ranch ==
He hired landscape architect Lawrence Halprin to design the master plan for Sea Ranch. Boeke created a committee which reviewed home plans, which restricted homes to two stories with natural colors and mandated underground power lines to preserve the area's natural heritage. Boeke commissioned extensive environmental impact studies, which led to the reseeding of former sheep grazing areas, the removal of debris and logs left by logging, and the replanting of native trees. American architects who were hired as consultants and designers included Joseph Esherick, Donlyn Lyndon, Charles Willard Moore, Richard Whitaker and William Turnbull. The American Institute of Architects awarded a 10-unit Sea Ranch condo building its "award of enduring excellence" in 1991. The Institute said that Sea Ranch "formed an alliance of architecture and nature that has inspired and captivated a generation of architects" at the time. New York Times style critic Alice Gregory observed "With its gentle footprint on the California coast, simple wood houses and almost dictatorial aesthetic strictures, it feels as modern today as it did 50 years ago."

== Death ==
Al Boeke died at his home in Sea Ranch, California, on November 8, 2011, at the age of 88. He was survived by his current wife, Pamela Clarke Boeke; two sons from his previous marriage, Brandt and Alan; his brother and sister; and several grandchildren.
