= Condominium 1 =

Historic residential building in California, United States

- U.S. National Register of Historic Places
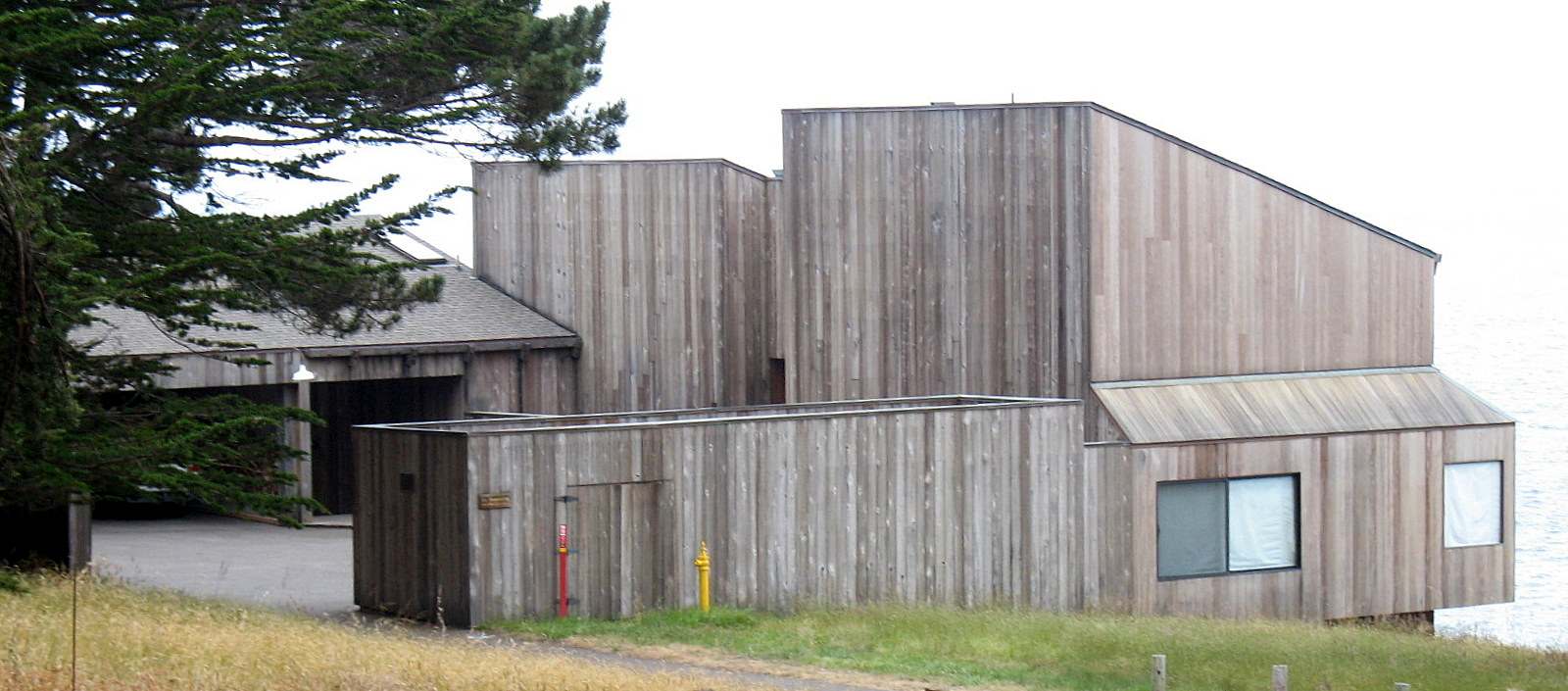
- Condominium 1

- Location within California Location within the United States
- Location: 110-128 Sea Walk Dr., The Sea Ranch, California
- Coordinates: 38°40′45″N 123°25′40″W
- Area: 3.3 acres (1.3 ha)
- Built: 1965
- Architects: Moore, Turnbull, Lyndon, Whitaker
- Architectural style: Third Bay Tradition
- NRHP reference No.: 05000731
- Added to NRHP: July 29, 2005

Condominium 1 was the first unit in the Sea Ranch development in Sonoma County, California. Located on a coast overlooking the Pacific Ocean, the complex was designed by Charles W. Moore, Donlyn Lyndon, William Turnbull Jr. and Richard Whitaker of the MLTW partnership in 1963–1964, and was built by contractor Matthew Sylvia in 1965. The timber-framed structure has been described as one of the most significant architectural designs of the 1960s in California, and has received numerous awards.

== Description ==
Condominium 1 is located on the edge of a cliff overlooking the Pacific. It is a complex of ten condominium units, intended to be seen as a single structure. The design was inspired by barns and other farm buildings in the region and, with the help of landscape architect Lawrence Halprin, was built to take into account the local ecology. The timber frame is clad in vertical redwood siding, with vertical forms resembling mine structures anchoring a series of sloping roofs that descend toward the ocean, perforated by skylights. Windows are plain openings without trim or mullions. There are no eaves or significant fascia trim. On the uphill side the building wraps around a courtyard that houses the units' garages. Interior spaces feature the full range of MLTW-developed design elements.

The 10-unit structure was Moore's first major work. It exemplifies Moore's "shed style" with single-pitched roofs, board siding, and plain detailing. The style, with its emphasis on a partnership with the site, was a break from the International Style. The design principles established by Condominium 1 included the use of what Moore termed aedicules, small intimate spaces defined by four columns and a canopy, and "saddlebags", small projections of the interior space to the exterior that provide a view or a contemplative space. The units are arranged with horizontal and vertical view lines through the space.

== Reception ==
The condominium was featured in an extensive public relations campaign to promote the Sea Ranch development. It appeared in Newsweek, The New York Times, and Life, as well as design magazines such as Perspecta and Japan Architect. It received a design citation from Progressive Architect, a California Governor's Design Award in 1966 and an American Institute of Architects Honor Award in 1967. In 1991 it received the AIA Twenty-five Year Award and Moore was awarded the AIA Gold Medal. The structure was placed on the National Register of Historic Places in 2005.

== See also ==
- National Register of Historic Places listings in Sonoma County, California
- Baker House, also in Sea Ranch and NRHP-listed
- Third Bay Tradition
- Sonoma County Historic Landmarks and Districts
