= Baker House (Sea Ranch, California) =

United States historic place

- U.S. National Register of Historic Places
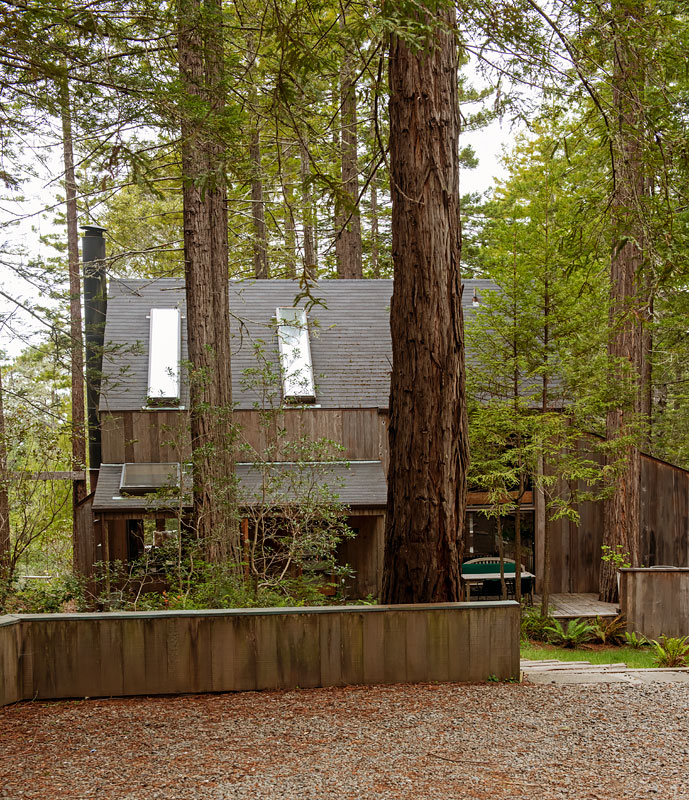

- Location within California
- Location: 35292 Timber Ridge Rd., Sea Ranch, California
- Coordinates: 38°41′30″N 123°25′13″W
- Built: 1968
- Architect: William Turnbull Jr.
- NRHP reference No.: 100003234
- Added to NRHP: December 12, 2018

The Baker House in Sea Ranch, California was listed on the National Register of Historic Places in 2018. It was designed by architect William Turnbull Jr. and was built in 1968.

Per a 2019 article in design magazine Dwell, it is the only "Blinker Barn" that is listed on the National Register, and was listed for sale in 2019 at $1,325,000.

Its 1968 redwood interior was crafted by Matthew Silvia. It was expanded to the rear in 2010 by addition of a structure connected by a catwalk.

== See also ==
- Condominium 1, also in Sea Ranch and NRHP-listed
