= Oceanside Public Library =

Library in Oceanside, California

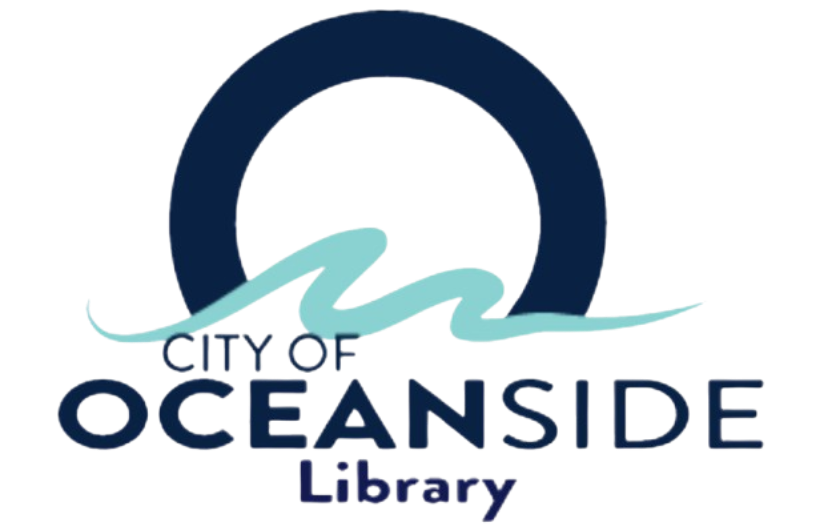

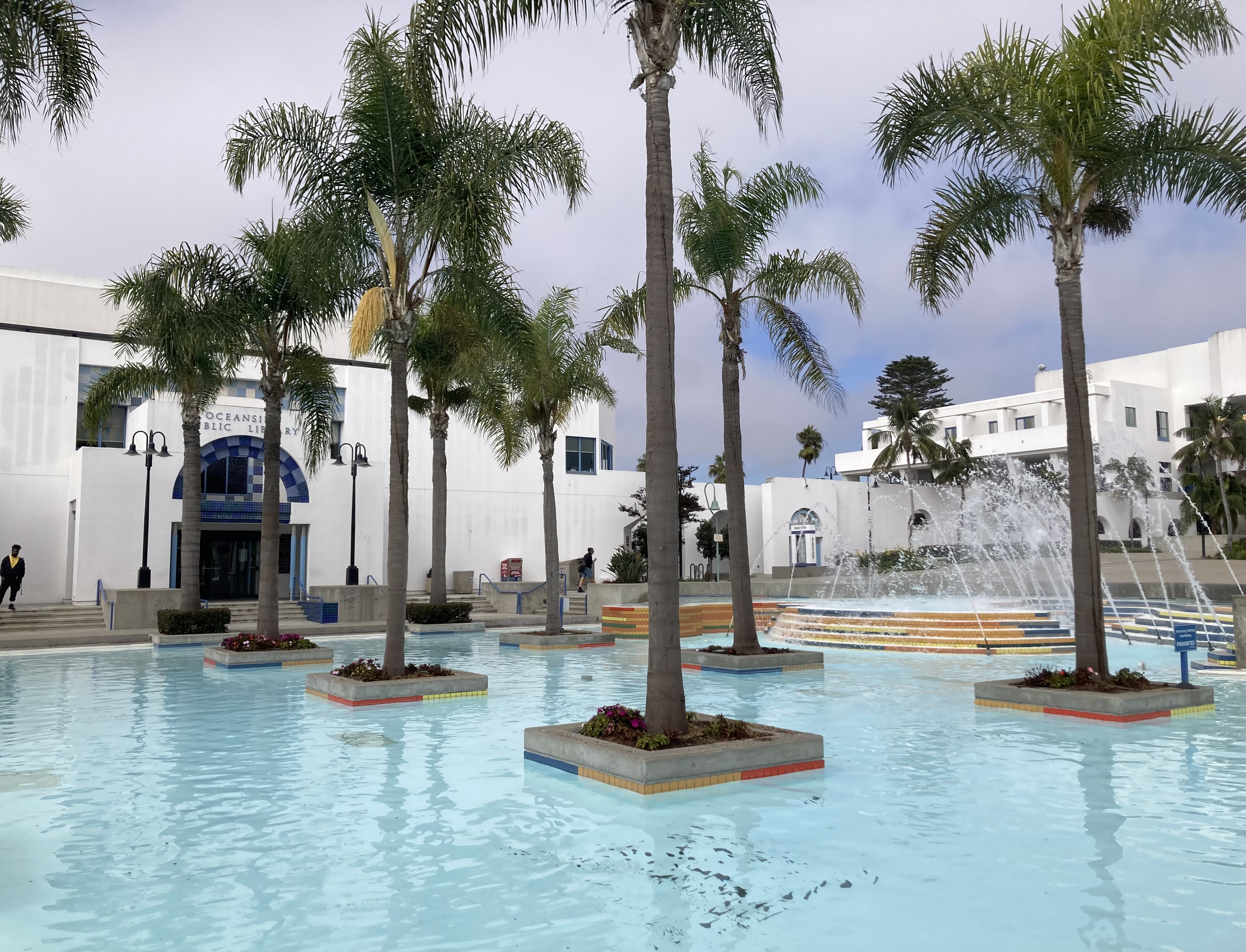
- The Civic Center Library in 2024

- Location within San Diego County, California Oceanside Public Library (California) Oceanside Public Library (the United States)

General information
- Status: Operating
- Type: Public library
- Architectural style: Moderne/Mission Revival
- Location: Oceanside, California, 330 N Coast Hwy, Oceanside, CA 92054
- Coordinates: 33.1975°N 117.3804°W
- Opened: 1989

Design and construction
- Architect: Charles Moore

Website
- www.oceansidelibrary.org

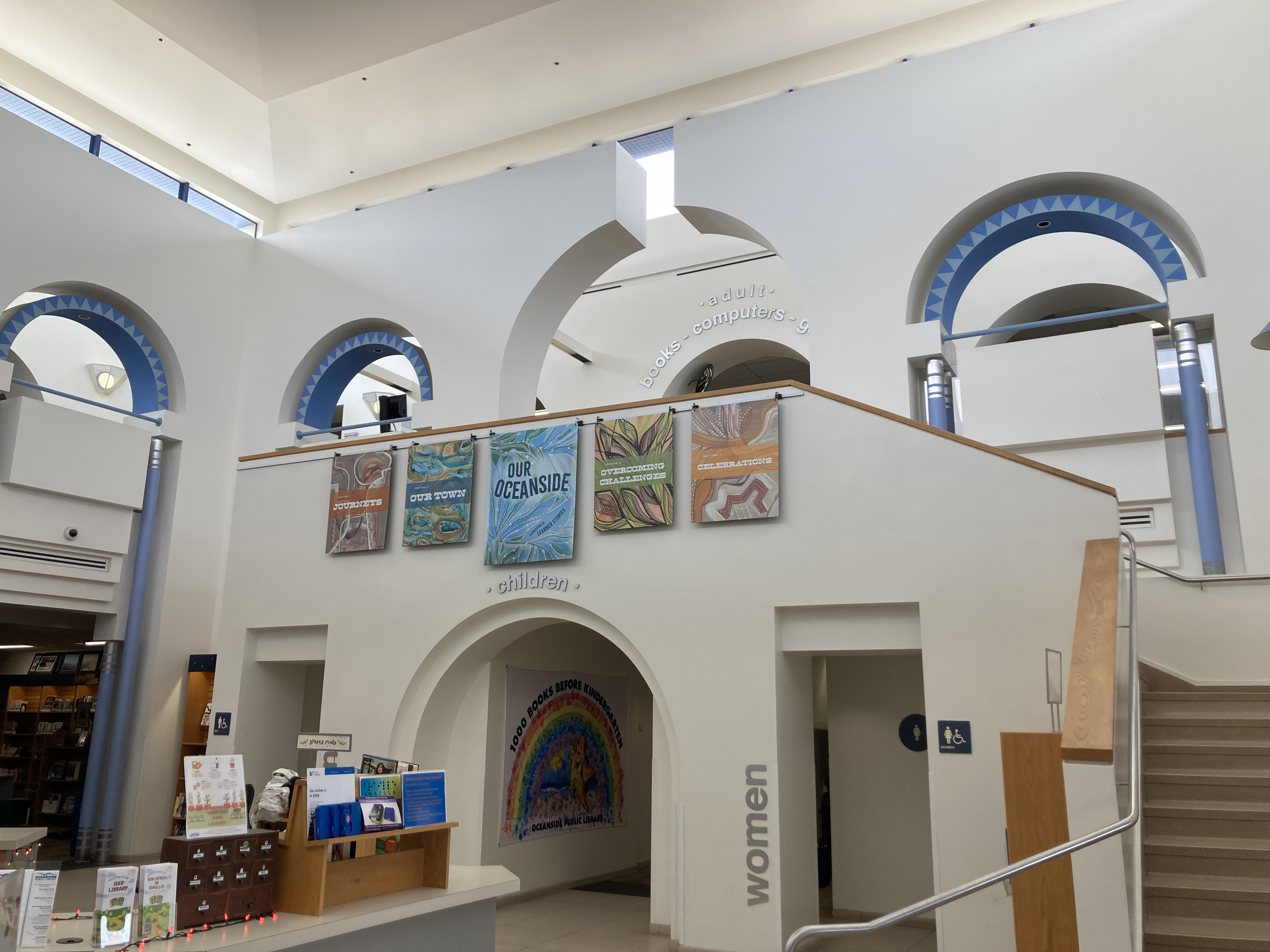
Interior

Oceanside Public Library is a public library system serving Oceanside, California. Founded in 1904, it has four locations in the city, with the main one at the civic center. The city also operates bookmobiles and smaller mini-libraries.

== History ==
The library was founded on December 13, 1904, when the city passed Ordinance No. 150. The Woman's Christian Temperance Union had previously donated 250 books to the city. The library, when it opened in 1905, was originally located on the upper floor of the Bank of Oceanside's building but relocated to a room on Third Street in February 1915. In November 1916, it moved again, this time to Hill Street, in the First National Bank Building. Soon after, it moved a few buildings south, where it stayed until its lease expired in 1924.

The library shared the main floor of the 100F building on Second Street with the city hall until its vacation in 1929 at the behest of JCPenney. Both were relocated to the top floor of the Armed Services Building before the city decided that they would create a permanent building for the library and city hall. A building at 704 Pier View Way was completed in 1934, and the library used it until 1946 when a new building was constructed at 327 North Nevada Street. Another move occurred in 1972, into a redesigned Safeway store. The City Council Chambers moved into the former building.

The city acquired a bookmobile in 1968, with the library later moving to the Civic Center in 1989, in a building designed by Charles Moore, emulating the style of Irving Gill. The Mission and Oceanside READS Learning Center Branches opened in 1986 and 1998, respectively. The Civic Center location was significantly refitted in 2011. In 2015, the library was awarded $30,000 total in two grants. During the COVID-19 pandemic, books were delivered to citizens' houses.
