= California Center for the Arts, Escondido =

Performing and visual arts center in Escondido, California

- Address: 340 N Escondido Blvd; Escondido, California; United States
- Owner: City of Escondido
- Operator: California Center for the Arts, Escondido Foundation
- Type: Performing arts center and museum

Construction
- Opened: October 1, 1994

Website
- https://artcenter.org

The California Center for the Arts, Escondido (often abbreviated CCAE) is a nonprofit performing and visual arts complex located in Escondido, California, United States. The institution opened on October 1, 1994 and presents concerts, theatrical performances, art exhibitions, festivals, and arts education programs serving North San Diego County.

The campus occupies approximately 12 acres in downtown Escondido adjacent to Grape Day Park and Escondido City Hall. The property is owned by the City of Escondido and operated by the nonprofit California Center for the Arts Escondido Foundation.

== History ==
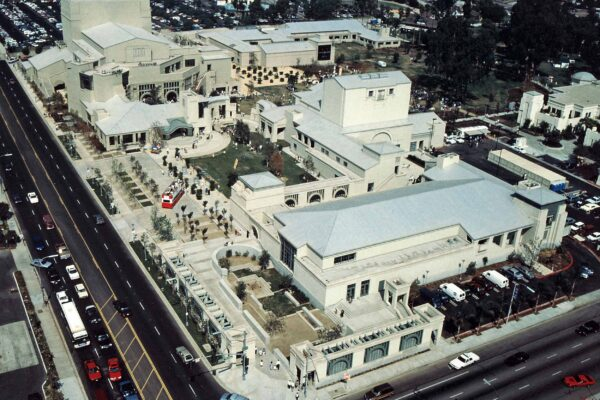
Aerial view of the California Center for the Arts, Escondido shortly after its opening in 1994.

Efforts to establish a permanent arts venue in Escondido developed during the mid twentieth century as civic leaders and arts organizations expanded cultural programming in the region. The Philharmonic Arts Association launched a concert series in 1946 that brought visiting performers to the city including Rise Stevens, Jose Greco, Artur Rubinstein, and the Los Angeles Philharmonic.

During the 1960s and 1970s several civic planning efforts proposed the development of a cultural campus in downtown Escondido. A 1962 planning document known as the Alexander Report recommended construction of a civic complex that would include an arts center alongside municipal buildings.

In June 1985 voters approved a bond measure supporting construction of a municipal arts center as part of the city’s downtown redevelopment plan.

Groundbreaking for the facility took place in June 1991 in nearby Grape Day Park. The California Center for the Arts officially opened on October 1, 1994.

== Architecture ==
The arts complex was designed by the architectural firm Moore Ruble Yudell following an international design competition sponsored by the City of Escondido and the National Endowment for the Arts. Architect Charles Moore incorporated design elements influenced by traditional Southern California architecture and Spanish Colonial forms.

The campus was conceived as a multi venue cultural facility combining performance, exhibition, and civic event spaces within a unified architectural complex.

== Facilities ==
The campus contains several venues used for performances, exhibitions, and community programming.

=== Concert Hall ===
The Concert Hall seats approximately 1,523 and hosts concerts, dance performances, touring productions, and special events.

=== Center Theater ===
The Center Theater seats approximately 404 and is used for smaller performances including plays, concerts, lectures, and community productions.

=== Museum ===
The on site museum presents rotating exhibitions featuring contemporary artists, regional artists, and traveling exhibitions.

=== Conference Center ===
The Conference Center includes ballroom and meeting facilities used for conferences, corporate events, weddings, and community gatherings.

== Programming and exhibitions ==
The institution presents programming across music, theater, dance, and visual arts and hosts touring artists as well as regional performers and community productions. Educational initiatives include youth classes, workshops, field trips, and artist led programs designed to expand access to arts education.

Several exhibitions presented by the museum have received regional media attention. In 2025 the museum presented XICANA! San Diego, an exhibition featuring work by more than one hundred artists exploring Chicana identity and cultural history.

In 2022 the exhibition Street Legacy: SoCal Style Masters included an installation titled Three Slick Pigs by artist OG Slick depicting pigs dressed as police officers, which generated public discussion among local officials and community members.

In 2026 the museum presented Designing the Infinite: Virtual Worldbuilding in Art & Gaming, an exhibition examining how artists use digital environments and worldbuilding to explore contemporary cultural themes.

== Community role ==
The California Center for the Arts serves as a regional venue for performing and visual arts programming in North San Diego County. In addition to exhibitions and performances the institution collaborates with schools, artists, and community organizations to provide arts education and outreach programs.

== See also ==
- Escondido, California
- List of museums in San Diego County, California
- Performing arts center
