= Richard Whitaker (architect) =

American Third Bay Tradition architect

- Education: UC Berkeley College of Environmental Design
- Occupation: Architect

Richard Whitaker was (born 1919, died October 2021) an American Third Bay Tradition architect. Whitaker was one of four architects who designed The Sea Ranch. He was the teaching assistant to Lawrence Halprin at the University of California, Berkeley. Halprin invited Whitaker along to help with the project.

In 1965, he became Director of Education for the American Institute of Architects. He was also the Executive Director of the Association of Collegiate Schools of Architecture. He worked at the University of Colorado from 1967 until 1971, where he served as Director of Design. Next, he worked at the University of Wisconsin–Milwaukee. Whitaker served as dean of the school of architecture at the University of Illinois at Chicago. He developed architectural programs for colleges, practiced professionally, and consulted internationally. Today, Whitaker owns a house at Sea Ranch. The house was designed by and for Dimitri Vedensky in 1972.

== Notable works ==
- Condominium 1
