= Sea Ranch, California =

Unincorporated community in California, United States

- Unincorporated community Census designated place
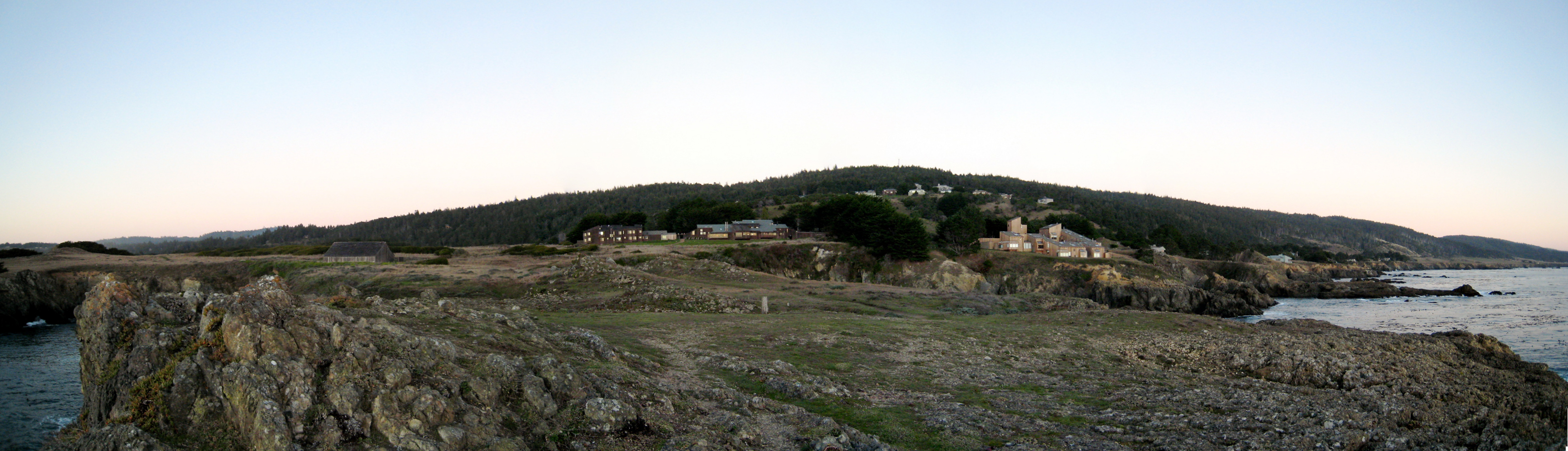
- Panoramic view of The Sea Ranch
- Nickname: The Sea Ranch
- Location within the state of California Sea Ranch, California (the United States)
- Coordinates: 38°42′55″N 123°27′16″W
- Country: United States
- State: California
- County: Sonoma

Area
  - Total: 16.224 sq mi (42.020 km^{2})
  - Land: 16.117 sq mi (41.743 km^{2})
  - Water: 0.107 sq mi (0.277 km^{2}) 0.66%
- Elevation: 108 ft (33 m)

Population (2020)
  - Total: 1,169
  - Density: 72.53/sq mi (28.00/km^{2})
- Time zone: UTC-8 (PST)
  - Summer (DST): UTC-7 (PDT)
- ZIP code: 95497
- Area code: 707
- FIPS code: 06-70712
- GNIS feature IDs: 1723333, 2583133
- Website: www.tsra.org

Sea Ranch (also known as The Sea Ranch) is an American unincorporated Pacific Coast community, in Sonoma County, California, United States, approximately 100 mi (160 km) north of San Francisco. It was developed as a planned community beginning in the 1960s. It is known for its distinctive timber-frame structures designed by several noted American architects. The first unit built at Sea Ranch, Condominium One, was placed on the National Register of Historic Places in 2005. The community's ten-mile development played a role in the establishment of the California Coastal Commission. The population was 1,169 at the 2020 census. For statistical purposes, the United States Census Bureau has defined Sea Ranch as a census-designated place (CDP).

== History ==
The first people known to live in the area were Pomos, who gathered kelp and shellfish from the beaches.

In 1846, Ernest Rufus received the Rancho German Mexican land grant, which extended along the coastline from the Gualala River to Ocean Cove. The land was later divided. In the early 1900s, Walter P. Frick bought up the pieces to create Del Mar Ranch, which was leased out for raising sheep. In 1941, the land was sold to Margaret Ohlson and her family.

Architect and planner Al Boeke envisioned a community that would preserve the area's natural beauty. Boeke first surveyed the land in 1962. In 1963, Oceanic California Inc., a division of Castle and Cooke Inc., purchased the land from the Ohlsons and assembled a design team. A progressive residential community was envisioned that would be built in a way that was not only in tune with nature, but driven by nature.

Principal designers who were recruited by Boeke included American architects Charles Moore, Joseph Esherick, William Turnbull Jr., Donlyn Lyndon, Richard Whitaker, and landscape architect Lawrence Halprin. Halprin created the master plan for Sea Ranch, which encompass 10 miles (16 km) of the Sonoma County coastline. Architects Moore, Lyndon, Turnbull and Whitaker were hired to design an ecocentric condominium as a model for the development of the community. It was completed in 1965.

The principal photographer for the project was the architectural photographer Morley Baer, a friend and colleague of both Turnbull and Halprin. Marion Conrad was hired to manage the public relations for The Sea Ranch. The logo for The Sea Ranch was designed by Barbara Stauffacher Solomon along with her Supergraphics used throughout the development and its publications and documents.

=== Beach access dedication ===
While the County Board of Supervisors initially regarded the developer's offer to dedicate 140 acres (0.57 km^{2}) for public parkland as sufficient, opponents felt more coastal access was necessary. The site, containing ten miles (16 km) of shore, had been available to the public, but would be reserved for private use under the developer's plan. Areas below the high tide line were and would remain public property, but the plan provided no access through the development. In addition, California's coast at the time was only open to the public along 100 of its 1,300 miles (2,100 km).

Californians Organized to Acquire Access to State Tidelands (COAST) was formed in response to this issue, and their 1968 county ballot initiative attempted to require the development to include public trails to the tidelands. While the initiative did not pass, the California legislature's Dunlap Act did pass that year and required that new coastal development dedicate trails granting public access to the ocean. This episode led to the establishment of the Coastal Alliance, an organization of 100 groups similar to COAST, that placed Proposition 20 on the statewide 1972 ballot. The initiative passed, and it established the California Coastal Commission that continues to regulate land use on the California coast.

== Geography ==
The Sea Ranch is located along the Pacific Coast, about 100 mi (160 km) north of San Francisco and 120 mi (190 km) west of Sacramento. The Sea Ranch is reached by way of State Route 1.

Approximately 4 mi (6 km) northwest of The Sea Ranch, in neighboring Mendocino County, is Gualala, a small town.

=== Climate ===
According to the Köppen Climate Classification system, Sea Ranch has a warm-summer Mediterranean climate, abbreviated as "Csb" on climate maps.

Climate data for Sea Ranch (1980–2016)
Month	Jan	Feb	Mar	Apr	May	Jun	Jul	Aug	Sep	Oct	Nov	Dec	Year
Mean daily maximum °F (°C)	56.5 (13.6)	59.7 (15.4)	61.5 (16.4)	64.5 (18.1)	67.5 (19.7)	71.0 (21.7)	73.0 (22.8)	74.0 (23.3)	72.8 (22.7)	68.3 (20.2)	61.3 (16.3)	56.0 (13.3)	65.5 (18.6)
Mean daily minimum °F (°C)	42.0 (5.6)	43.7 (6.5)	45.0 (7.2)	46.3 (7.9)	48.8 (9.3)	50.8 (10.4)	51.0 (10.6)	51.0 (10.6)	50.8 (10.4)	48.0 (8.9)	45.7 (7.6)	42.0 (5.6)	47.1 (8.4)
Average precipitation inches (mm)	6.5 (170)	6.4 (160)	4.73 (120)	2.2 (56)	1 (25)	0.33 (8.4)	0.05 (1.3)	0.08 (2.0)	0.43 (11)	1.98 (50)	4.5 (110)	6.56 (167)	34.76 (883)
Average precipitation days	13	10	12	7	4	1	0	1	2	4	10	12	76
Source 1: weatherspark
Source 2: bestplaces.net

== Media ==
=== Radio ===
Sea Ranch is served by KGUA, an independent public media station, located immediately north of Sea Ranch in Gualala.

=== Newspaper ===
The Independent Coast Observer is a weekly newspaper based in Gualala that covers the stretch of coast from Jenner in Sonoma County to Elk in Mendocino County, which is colloquially referred to as the Mendonoma Coast.

== Demographics ==
Historical population
Census	Pop.	Note	%±
1980	307		—
1990	526		71.3%
2000	751		42.8%
2010	1,305		73.8%
2020	1,169		−10.4%
2023 (est.)	1,200		2.7%
U.S. Decennial Census; 1860–1870 1880–1890; 1900 1910 1920; 1930 1940 1950; 1960 1970 1980; 1990 2000 2010; 2020

For statistical purposes, the United States Census Bureau defined Sea Ranch as a census-designated place (CDP) in 2010. The census definition of the area may not precisely correspond to the local understanding of the community.

=== Racial and ethnic composition ===
Sea Ranch CDP, California – Racial and ethnic composition Note: the US Census treats Hispanic/Latino as an ethnic category. This table excludes Latinos from the racial categories and assigns them to a separate category. Hispanics/Latinos may be of any race.
Race / Ethnicity (NH = Non-Hispanic)	Pop 2010	Pop 2020	% 2010	% 2020
White alone (NH)	1,145	1,000	87.74%	85.54%
Black or African American alone (NH)	15	3	1.15%	0.26%
Native American or Alaska Native alone (NH)	3	3	0.23%	0.26%
Asian alone (NH)	10	19	0.77%	1.63%
Native Hawaiian or Pacific Islander alone (NH)	0	0	0.00%	0.00%
Other race alone (NH)	1	2	0.08%	0.17%
Mixed race or Multiracial (NH)	14	41	1.07%	3.51%
Hispanic or Latino (any race)	117	101	8.97%	8.64%
Total	1,305	1,169	100.00%	100.00%

=== 2020 census ===
As of the 2020 census, Sea Ranch had a population of 1,169 and a population density of 72.2 inhabitants per square mile (27.9/km^{2}). The median age was 68.0 years. 5.4% of residents were under the age of 18 and 59.5% were 65 years of age or older. For every 100 females, there were 83.5 males, and for every 100 females age 18 and over there were 82.8 males age 18 and over.

0.0% of residents lived in urban areas, while 100.0% lived in rural areas.

There were 670 households, of which 9.0% had children under the age of 18 living in them. Of all households, 52.5% were married-couple households, 14.2% were households with a male householder and no spouse or partner present, and 28.5% were households with a female householder and no spouse or partner present. About 35.8% of all households were made up of individuals, and 25.2% had someone living alone who was 65 years of age or older.

There were 1,781 housing units at an average density of 108.1 per square mile (41.7/km^{2}). Of occupied housing units, 88.5% were owner-occupied and 11.5% were occupied by renters. 62.4% of housing units were vacant; the homeowner vacancy rate was 2.7% and the rental vacancy rate was 33.6%.

=== 2010 census ===
The 2010 United States census reported that The Sea Ranch had a population of 1,305. The population density was 80.7 inhabitants per square mile (31.2/km^{2}). The racial makeup of The Sea Ranch was 1,220 (93.5%) White, 15 (1.1%) African American, 3 (0.2%) Native American, 10 (0.8%) Asian, 0 (0.0%) Pacific Islander, 37 (2.8%) from other races, and 20 (1.5%) from two or more races. Hispanic or Latino of any race were 117 persons (9.0%).

The census reported that 100% of the population lived in households.

There were 689 households, out of which 58 (8.4%) had children under the age of 18 living in them, 407 (59.1%) were opposite-sex married couples living together, 19 (2.8%) had a female householder with no husband present, 9 (1.3%) had a male householder with no wife present. There were 27 (3.9%) unmarried opposite-sex partnerships, and 21 (3.0%) same-sex married couples or partnerships. 197 households (28.6%) were made up of individuals, and 113 (16.4%) had someone living alone who was 65 years of age or older. The average household size was 1.89. There were 435 families (63.1% of all households); the average family size was 2.25.

The population was spread out, with 105 people (8.0%) under the age of 18, 18 people (1.4%) aged 18 to 24, 92 people (7.0%) aged 25 to 44, 495 people (37.9%) aged 45 to 64, and 595 people (45.6%) who were 65 years of age or older. The median age was 63.7 years. For every 100 females, there were 91.6 males. For every 100 females age 18 and over, there were 90.2 males.

There were 1,818 housing units at an average density of 112.4 per square mile (43.4/km^{2}), of which 85.8% were owner-occupied and 14.2% were occupied by renters. The homeowner vacancy rate was 3.4%; the rental vacancy rate was 38.8%. 81.5% of the population lived in owner-occupied housing units and 18.5% lived in rental housing units.

== Design ==
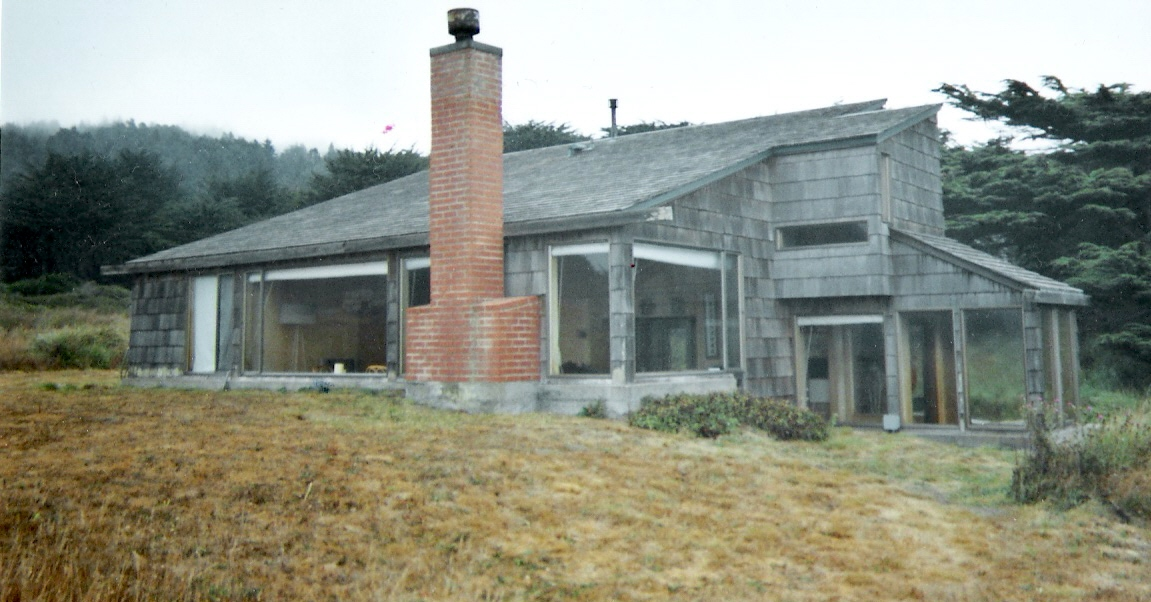
Sea Ranch house designed by Joseph Esherick in 1966

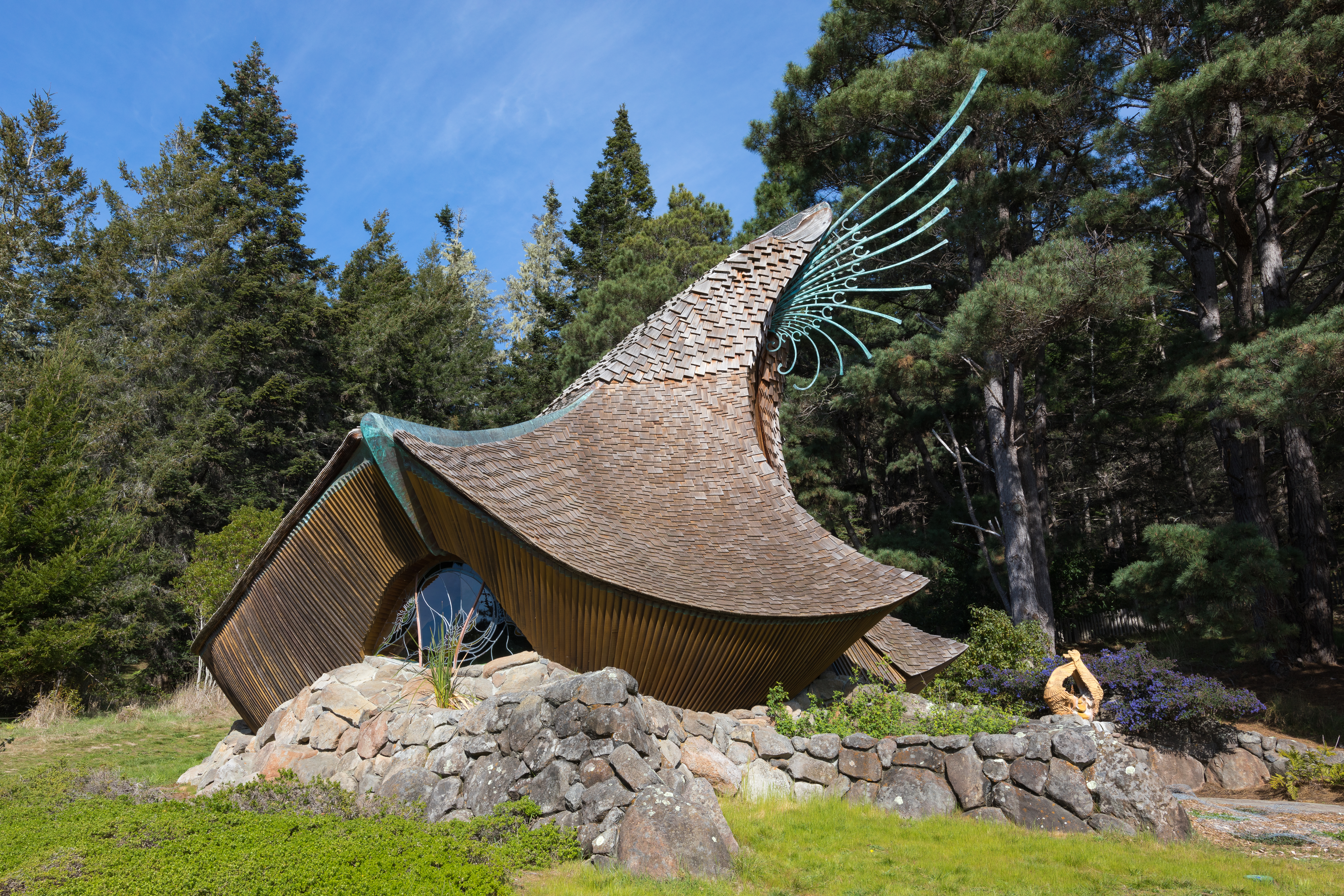
The Sea Ranch Chapel, designed by James Hubbell

The Sea Ranch has distinctive architecture consisting of simple timber-frame structures clad in wooden siding or shingles. The building typology of the Sea Ranch draws on the local agricultural buildings for inspiration, in the way that those buildings are designed to deal with prevailing weather and topography. Originally, the Sea Ranch had local lumber mills to draw on for the Douglas Fir and Redwood used in the homes. The majority of the 1800 or so homes are smaller second homes, although there are approximately 300 full-time residents. Approximately half the homes are rented as weekend rentals. The eventual build-out is expected to comprise approximately 2400 homes; the number varies as some current owners purchase adjacent vacant lots and merge the two, to preserve open space. The buildings could be considered a hybrid of modern and vernacular architecture, also known as the "Third Bay Tradition" and also referred to as "Sea Ranch" style.

The original design guidelines suggest that buildings have a site-specific relationship with the landscape. The Sea Ranch design review requirements specify that the buildings become part of the landscape, not subordinate to it, but do not dominate either. Details such as exteriors of unpainted wood or muted stains, a lack of overhanging eaves, and baffles on exterior lighting subdue the appearance of the buildings in the landscape. The baffles minimize nighttime light pollution; there are no street lights to obscure the night sky. The lack of roof overhangs is also intended to allow the near-constant strong breezes to pass over the buildings without the turbulence overhangs would create. The Sea Ranch design review process does not affect the building interiors, but all construction is subject to Sonoma County Permit and Resource Management oversight.

Landscaping in The Sea Ranch is regulated by a design manual that prohibits perimeter fences and limits non-indigenous plants to screened courtyards. A herd of sheep is used to keep grass low to the ground to reduce the threat of fire during the summer months.

== Education ==
The school districts are Horicon Elementary School District and Point Arena Joint Union High School District.

== Professionals associated with the development ==
=== Architects ===
Over the decades many architects have designed houses at Sea Ranch, including:

- Al Boeke
- Joseph Esherick
- Nicholas Forell
- Paul Lucas Hamilton
- George W. Homsey
- James Hubbell (artist)
- Donlyn Lyndon
- Charles Moore
- William Turnbull Jr.
- Richard Whitaker

=== Graphic designer ===
- Barbara Stauffacher Solomon

=== Landscape architects ===
- Lawrence Halprin

== Points of interest ==
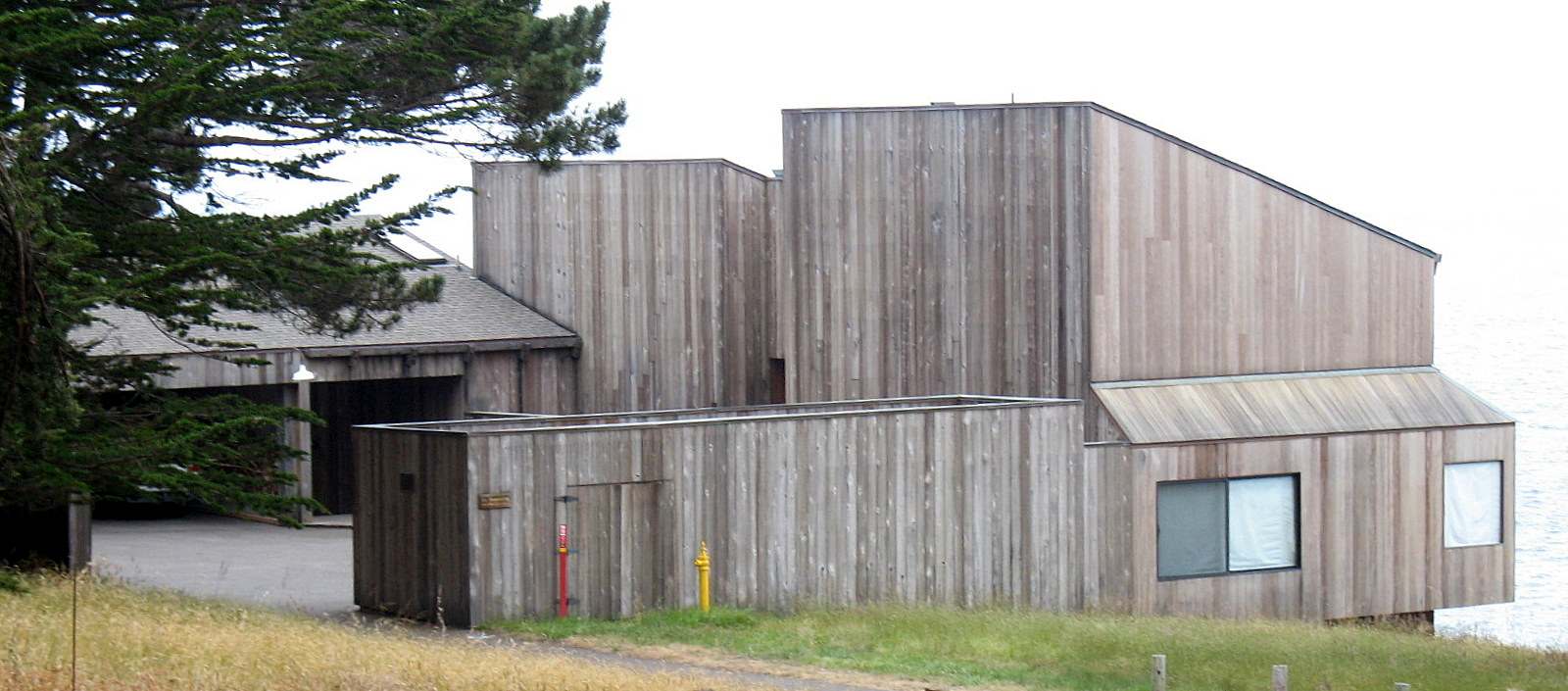
Condominium One

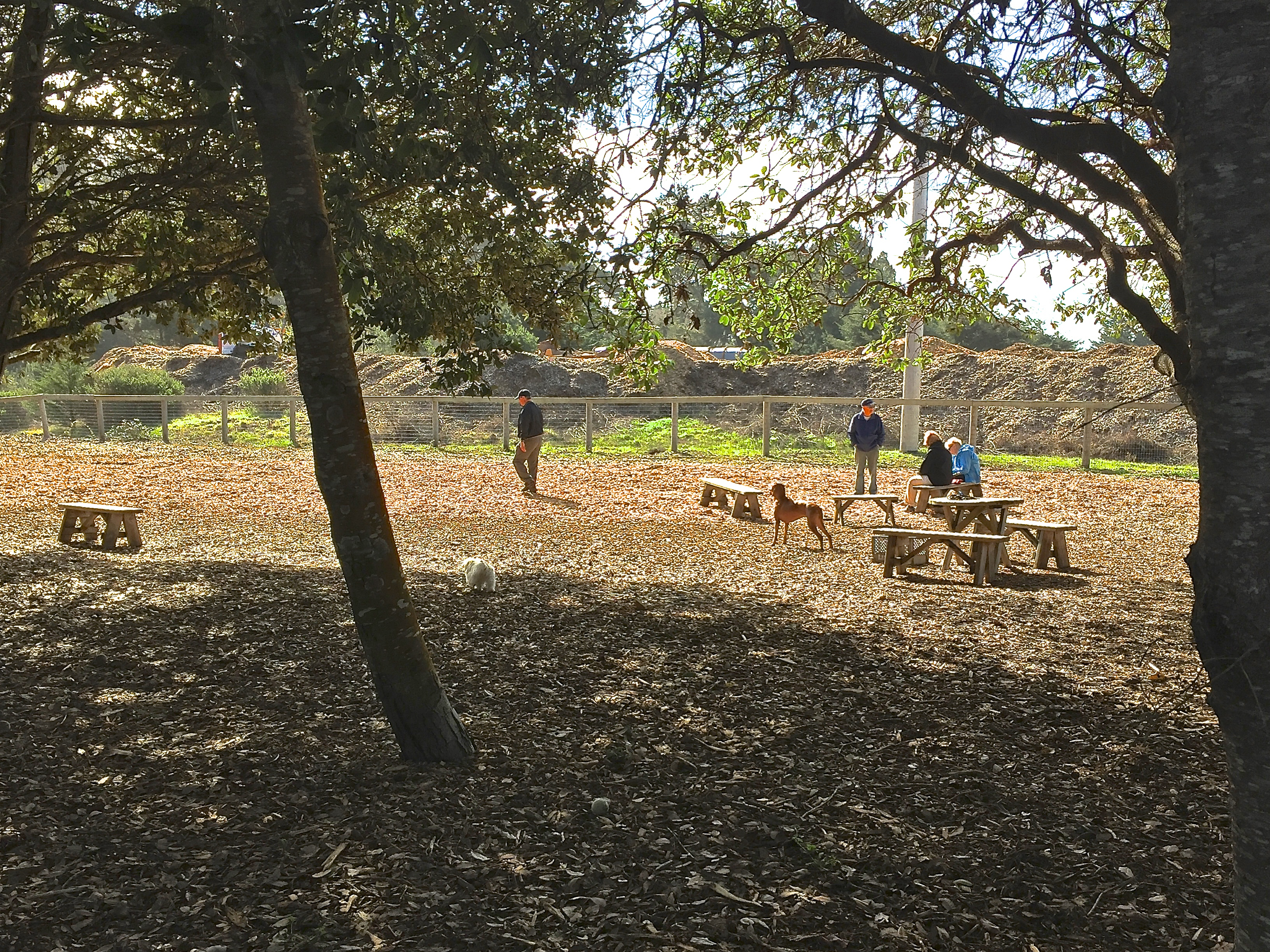
Owners gather with their pets at Sea Ranch Dog Park

Condominium One (completed in 1965) was awarded the American Institute of Architects Twenty-five Year Award in 1991, and was added to The National Register of Historic Places in 2005.

The nondenominational Sea Ranch Chapel and surrounding grounds were gifts of The Sea Ranch residents Robert and Betty Buffum. Upon completion in December 1985, the chapel was dedicated in memory of Kirk Ditzler, navy aviator, zoologist, and artist.

The Sonoma County Regional Parks Department provides coastal access from six places along State Route 1 in The Sea Ranch area:

- Black Point (trail) at 35035 State Route 1
- Gualala Point Regional Park at 42401 State Route 1
- Pebble Beach (trail) at 36448 State Route 1
- Shell Beach (trail) at 39200 State Route 1
- Stengel Beach (trail) at 37900 State Route 1 (closed)
- Walk On Beach (trail) at 40101 State Route 1

== Notable people ==
- Denis Johnson
- Francine Shapiro
- Jeri Taylor
- Harmeet Dhillon
