= William Turnbull Jr. =

American architect (1935–1997)

- Born: April 1, 1935; New York City, U.S.
- Died: June 26, 1997 (aged 62); Sausalito, California, U.S.
- Education: Princeton University
- Occupation: Architect
- Awards: Fellow of the American Institute of Architects
- Projects: Sea Ranch, California

William Turnbull Jr., FAIA, (April 1, 1935 – June 26, 1997) was an American Bay Area architect whose unique building designs challenged the more traditional architecture of California's West Coast. His design style is most closely associated with the Sea Ranch community in Sonoma County, California. The Baker House (1968), within that community, is listed on the National Register of Historic Places.

== Career ==
Born in New York City in 1935, Turnbull was raised in Far Hills, New Jersey. Both of Turnbull's parents were architects, as was his great-grandfather George B. Post, who designed the New York Stock Exchange Building, Turnbull studied architecture at Princeton University, graduating in 1956. Upon completion of college, he moved to San Francisco and was employed at Skidmore, Owings & Merrill. Turnbull worked on a Big Sur revitalization project, which may have had a factor in developing his lifelong connection to California.

Turnbull's professional start was in the early 1960s with the development of the iconic Sea Ranch community in Sonoma County. Turnbull's co-design team included Charles Moore, Donlyn Lyndon, and Richard Whitaker, all of whom Turnbull knew from his days at Princeton, as well as Lawrence Halprin and Joseph Esherick. Turnbull had a long-term association and friendship with the architectural photographer Morley Baer who photographed many of his projects, including Sea Ranch. In addition to the Sea Ranch development, Turnbull was a contributor to Kresge College, the University of California, Santa Cruz, the Foothill Student housing complex at University of California, Berkeley, and St. Andrew's Presbyterian Church in Sonoma County, the latter of which he worked on with his wife and fellow architect Mary Griffin. Turnbull was one of four Bay Area architects invited to design an architectural facade for The Presence of the Past exhibition when it was shipped from the 1980 Venice Biennale and reinstalled in San Francisco in 1982.

== Personal life ==
Turnbull was married twice and fathered four children. In 1985 he married Mary Griffin, his second wife, who remained with him until his death. Turnbull designed his own winery vineyard, Johnson-Turnbull, which culminated after years of interest in wine-making. Turnbull died of cancer in his home in Sausalito, California on June 26, 1997. His wife, along with fellow architect Eric Haesloop, assumed operations of the "William Turnbull Associates" firm upon his death and continue to practice under the corporate name "Turnbull Griffin Haesloop".

== Selected bibliography ==
- William Turnbull Jr: buildings in the landscape (with William Stout, Dung Ngo, and Lauri Puchall) William Stout Publishers (2000)
- The poetics of gardens (with Charles W. Moore and William J. Mitchell) MIT Press (1993) ISBN 0-262-63153-9
