= Charles Moore (architect) =

American architect (1925–1993)

Charles Willard Moore
- Born: October 31, 1925; Benton Harbor, Michigan
- Died: December 16, 1993 (aged 68); Austin, Texas
- Education: University of Michigan (BArch '47); Princeton University (MFA '56, PhD '57)
- Occupation: Architect
- Awards: AIA Gold Medal (1991)
- Practice: Moore, Lyndon, Turnbull & Whittaker, San Francisco
- Buildings: Piazza D'Italia; Haas School
- Projects: Sea Ranch, California; Yale Building Project; Kresge College, UC Santa Cruz

Charles Willard Moore (October 31, 1925 – December 16, 1993) was an American architect, educator, writer, Fellow of the American Institute of Architects, and winner of the AIA Gold Medal in 1991. He is often labeled as the father of postmodernism. His work as an educator was important to a generation of American architects who read his books or studied with him at one of the several universities where he taught.

== Education ==
Moore graduated from the University of Michigan in 1947, where he was one of the top students in his class. After graduating, he worked for several years as an architect, served in the Army, and studied with Professor Jean Labatut at Princeton University, where he earned a master's degree and a PhD (1957). He remained for an additional year as a post-doctoral fellow, and as a teaching assistant to the architect Louis Kahn, who was teaching a design studio. While at Princeton, he met and befriended the architect Robert Venturi.

While at Princeton, Moore developed relationships with fellow students Donlyn Lyndon, William Turnbull Jr., Richard Peters, and Hugh Hardy. All remained lifelong friends and adherents to a view of architecture as a joyful, humanistic, pursuit that promised to make people happier and healthier. During his Princeton years, Moore designed and built a house for his mother in Pebble Beach, California, and worked during the summers for architect Wallace Holm of neighboring Monterey. Moore's Master's thesis explored ways to preserve and integrate Monterey's historic adobe dwellings into the fabric of the city. His Doctoral dissertation, "Water and Architecture", was a study of the importance of water in shaping the experience of place. The dissertation is significant for being one of the first pieces of architectural scholarship to draw from the work of Gaston Bachelard. Moore used some of the material in his later book, The Poetics of Gardens.

== Career ==
In 1959, Moore left Princeton to take a teaching position at the University of California, Berkeley. There he teamed with Donlyn Lyndon, William Turnbull Jr. and Richard Whittaker to form a new and influential firm: MLTW. They were among the first American architects to favor contextual designs—fitting well with the urban fabric of San Francisco—over harsh Modernist buildings that were alien to the texture of the city. When hired to design an innovative, environmentally sensitive condominium complex on the north coast, they applied some of their sensitivity to "place" to the project. Sea Ranch became one of the most admired, influential, and beloved works of the late twentieth century. Moore rose to become chairman and professor of architecture at Berkeley in five years. His work was featured in the seminal "Forty Under Forty" exhibition at New York's Architectural League that established the "Whites and the Grays" as competing camps of avant garde designers. Curated by Robert A.M. Stern, the show eventually became a book in 1969.

When Paul Rudolph resigned as Dean of the Yale School of Architecture, a nationwide search finally settled on Moore as his successor in 1965. As Stern observed in his history of the school, Moore was an energetic though often controversial leader who managed to steer the program through some of its most tumultuous, but also creative years. He served in that capacity for five years, leaving in 1970.

With Kent Bloomer, Moore founded the Yale Building Project in 1967 as a way both to demonstrate social responsibility and demystify the construction process for first-year students. He also pushed Yale president Kingman Brewster to hold a competition for a new mathematics building on the historic campus. The results of the contest were divisive, since Moore was seen as a champion of the winning architect, Robert Venturi. Many of Moore's students became leading architects of the next generation, including Mark Simon, Buzz Yudell, Gerald Allen, Elizabeth Plater-Zyberk, Andrés Duany, David Sellers, and Turner Brooks. An innovator in practice who often held design "charettes" to gain insights from clients, Moore also pioneered multi-partner, "suitcase" firms with his former students: Centerbrook Architects (Connecticut), Moore Ruble Yudell (Los Angeles) and Moore/Andersson (Austin, Texas). The constant changes resulted, in part, from Moore's extensive worldwide travel and his moves to California and then to Austin, Texas.

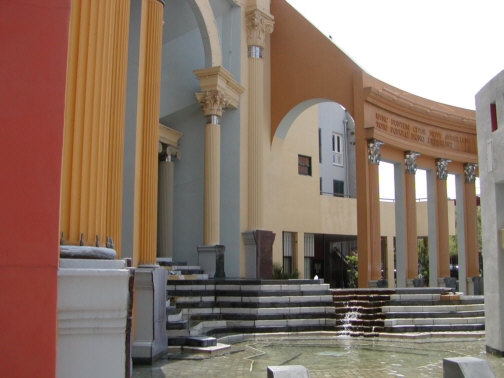
Piazza d'Italia, New Orleans

While at Yale Moore wrote a useful residential design book: The Place of Houses. Clients and designers loved its easy going style and beautiful drawings, but especially its commitment to "placemaking." With Donlyn Lyndon, Moore also founded the journal Places in Berkeley to expound ideas about the genius loci. He continued to write essays and books for the remainder of his career, including the influential "You Have To Pay for the Public Life," in Perspecta, one of the first predictors of suburban sprawl and the rise of the theme park in America. In 1975, Moore moved to the University of California, Los Angeles where he continued teaching. Finally, in 1985, he became the O'Neil Ford Centennial Professor of Architecture at the University of Texas at Austin. He died at home of a heart attack on December 16, 1993.

One of his last books, Body, Memory and Architecture, not only introduced new psychological and anthropological ideas into design theory, it also anticipated today's revolution in neuroscience, and the theory of "embodied cognition."

== Buildings and legacy ==
Moore preferred bold, colorful design elements, including striking color combinations, supergraphics, stylistic eclecticism, and the use of non-traditional materials such as plastic, (aluminized) PET film, platinum tiles, and neon signs. His work often provokes arousal, challenges norms, and can lean toward kitsch. His mid-1960s New Haven residence, published in Playboy, featured several plywood towers, each of which cut through one or more stories and featured large, graphical cutouts. His house in Orinda, California was also unconventional; in lieu of interior walls, two interior aediculae focus the space, one over a sitting area and the other over a bathtub set into the ground. He made no bones about his love for roadside vernacular buildings in places like San Miguel Allende, the Sunset Strip, and Main Street in Disneyland.

His early work with MLTW was noted for the invention of a west coast regional vernacular in residential architecture that featured steeply pitched roofs, shingled exteriors, and bold areas of glass, including skylights. Moore and his partners always cited the influence of their predecessors in California, particularly Bay Area pioneers such as Bernard Maybeck, William Wurster, and Joseph Esherick. A whole school of west coast designers followed their lead in designing shed-like, wooden residences for their newly affluent clients.

Moore was also sensitive to the needs of clients, building an innovative house for a blind man and his wife, and designing several churches. His urban design schemes were tailored to context and history, and his books are full of sophisticated scholarship on such things as Renaissance gardens, English Georgian houses, and Italian piazzas. His travels were always documented by color slides, sketches, and souvenirs, which he displayed prominently in his residences. Moore's Piazza d'Italia (1978), an urban public plaza in New Orleans, made prolific use of his exuberant design vocabulary and is frequently cited as the archetypal postmodern project. His university work includes the Hood Museum of Art at Dartmouth, the Williams College Museum of Art in Williamstown, Massachusetts, the Haas School of Business at the University of California, Berkeley, and the Faculty Club at the University of California, Santa Barbara. Kresge College, at the University of California, Santa Cruz, was one of the most innovative residence communities in America at the time of its construction. The main campus of National Dong Hwa University is his latest university work, finished in 1992.

Such design features (historical detail, ornament, fictional treatments, ironic significations) made Moore one of the chief proponents of postmodern architecture, along with Robert Venturi, Michael Graves, Stanley Tigerman, and Charles Jencks.

The Charles W. Moore Foundation was established in 1997 in Austin, Texas to preserve Moore's last home and studio. Its non-profit programs include residencies, conferences, lectures, and publication of PLACENOTES, a travel guide.

== Work ==
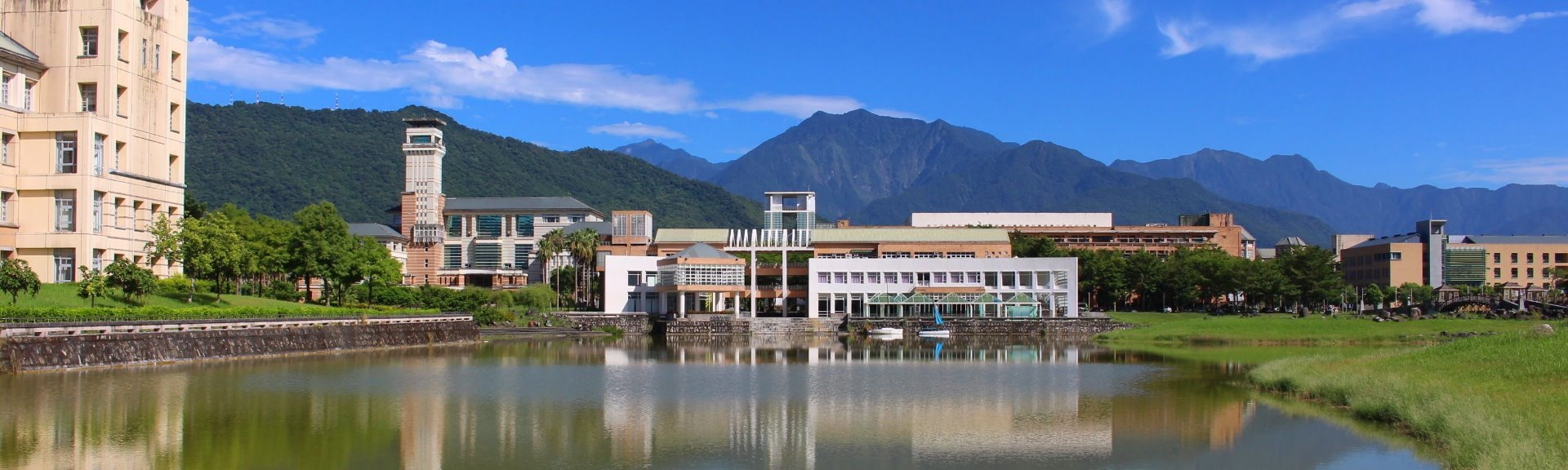
The Main Campus of National Dong Hwa University (1992)

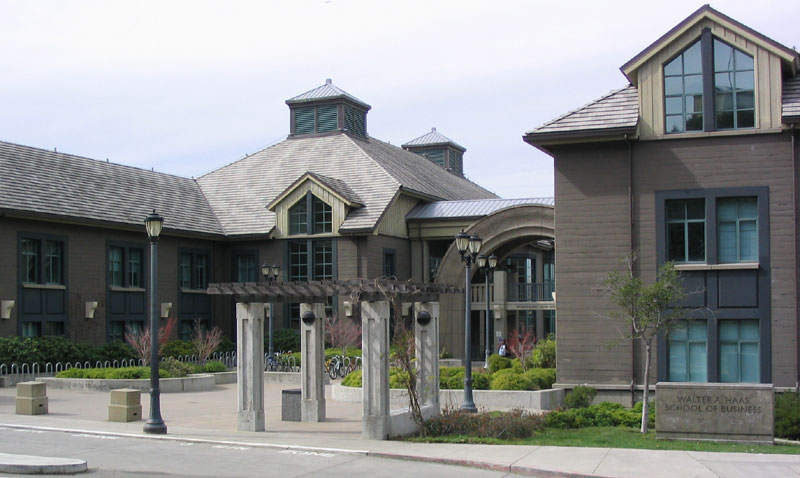
The Haas School of Business at UC Berkeley. Moore died before the project was completed in 1995.

- The influential Sea Ranch (1963) planned community in Sonoma County, California (with landscape architect Lawrence Halprin)
- Mutual Savings Bank Building, San Francisco, California (1964)
- The Seaside Professional Building (1959–60), in Seaside, California, was his first commercial building (1959–60), occupied by Monterey County Weekly since 1991.
- The Faculty Club at University of California, Santa Barbara, (1968) with William Turnbull
- Kresge College (1971) at University of California, Santa Cruz
- Leland Burns House, Pacific Palisades, (1973) (House noted for having a pipe organ in the living room)
- The postmodern archetype Piazza d'Italia (1978), an urban public plaza in New Orleans, Louisiana
- David Rodes House, Brentwood, California (1980) (featured in Life Magazine, December 1980)
- The Presence of the Past, architectural facade in Venice Biennale exhibition (1980)
- University Extension at the University of California, Irvine
- Oceanside Public Library and Oceanside Civic Center in Oceanside, California (1989)
- Cedar Rapids Museum of Art (1989) in Cedar Rapids, Iowa
- Pleasant Hill City Hall (1991) in Pleasant Hill, California
- The Beverly Hills Civic Center (1992) in Beverly Hills, California
- National Dong Hwa University, Hualien, Taiwan (1992)
- Gethsemane Episcopal Cathedral, Fargo, North Dakota (1992)
- The California Center for the Arts, Escondido in Escondido, California (1993)
- The Haas School of Business (1995) at the University of California, Berkeley
- Lurie Tower at the University of Michigan (1995)
- The Preview Center (became a Bank of America branch) in Celebration, Florida (1996)
- The Williams College Museum of Art addition in Williamstown, Massachusetts
- The Krishnamurti Center, Ojai, California
- His last work, the Washington State History Museum in Tacoma, Washington

== Bibliography ==
- Architekten, Charles Moore. Edition: 1. Auflage. Stuttgart

IRB Verlag, 1986.

- Allen, Gerald. Charles Moore. New York: Whitney Library of Design, 1980.
- Allen, Gerald and Charles W. Moore. Dimensions: shape, space and scale in architecture. New York: Architectural Record Books, 1976.
- Bloomer, Kent C. and Charles W. Moore; with a contribution by Robert Yudell. Body, memory, and architecture. New Haven: Yale University Press, 1920
- Johnson, Eugene J. Charles Moore: Buildings and Projects, 1949-1986. New York: Rizzoli, 1986.
- Keim, Kevin P and Charles W. Moore. An Architectural Life: Memoirs and Memories of Charles W. Moore. Boston, Little, Brown and Co., 1996.
- Littlejohn, David. Architect: The Life and Work of Charles W. Moore. New York: Holt, Rinehart and Winston, 1984.
- Lyndon, Donlyn. Chambers for a memory palace. Donlyn Lyndon and Charles W. Moore; with illustrations by the authors. Cambridge, Mass.: MIT Press, 1994.
- Moore, Charles W. Water and architecture. Princeton University, thesis, 1958.
- Moore, Charles W. The city observed, Los Angeles: a guide to its architecture and landscapes by Charles Moore, Peter Becker, Regula Campbell; photography by Regula Campbell. New York : Random House, 1984.
- Moore, Charles W. The poetics of gardens / Charles W. Moore, William J. Mitchell, William Turnbull Jr. Cambridge, Mass.: MIT Press, 1988.
- Moore, Charles W. The Yale Mathematics Building competition: architecture for a time of questioning. New Haven: Yale University Press, 1974.
- Moore, Charles W. and Sally Woodbridge. The cabin, the temple, the trailer; drawings by Diana Woodbridge [United States]: [publisher not identified], 1985.
- Moore, Charles W., Gerald Allen and Donlyn Lyndon. With axonometric drawings by William Turnbull. The place of houses. New York, Holt, Rinehart and Winston, 1974.
- Moore, Charles W. You have to pay for the public life : selected essays of Charles W. Moore edited by Kevin Keim. Cambridge, Mass.: MIT Press, 2001.
- Nakamura, Toshio (ed.). The Work of Charles W. Moore. Tokyo: A + U Publishing, 1978.
