= Donlyn Lyndon =

American architect (1936–2026)

- Born: January 7, 1936; Detroit, Michigan, U.S.
- Died: April 5, 2026 (aged 90); Sea Ranch, California, U.S.
- Occupation: Architect
- Spouse: Alice Wingwall (m. 1963; died 2026)
- Children: 3
- Parent(s): Maynard Lyndon, Dorothea Lyndon

Donlyn Lyndon (January 7, 1936 – April 5, 2026) was an American third bay tradition architect and the Eva Li professor of architecture and urban design at the University of California, Berkeley. Lyndon was a co-designer of Sea Ranch, California.

== Early and personal life ==
He was born in Detroit, Michigan, the son of Maynard Lyndon and Dorothea (née Zentgrebe) Lyndon. His parents divorced early on in his life, with his father moving to Southern California and Dorothy staying in Detroit with Lyndon.

He later met Alice Wingwall, born as Alice Atkinson, during his early years as an instructor in the College of Environmental Design at UC Berkeley. On December 28, 1963, the two were wedded in San Francisco’s Pacific Heights at the Swedenborgian Church. As his career progressed, they moved from Berkeley to Oregon and Massachusetts until finally returning to Berkeley. They settled in the Elmwood neighborhood, where they had two daughters and a son: Laura, Audrey, and Andrew.

In 2022, the couple moved permanently to Sea Ranch. Lyndon later died in Sea Ranch on April 5, 2026, at the age of 90.

== Education and career ==
M.F.A. Architecture, Princeton University A.B. Architecture, Princeton University

While at Princeton University, Lyndon “won a Fullbright scholarship to photograph ancient temples in Japan and India for the architectural library”.

During his time at Princeton, Lyndon met Charles Moore, who was the teaching assistant for his thesis studio under Louis Kahn, whom he later founded the MLTW firm with William Turnbull Jr. and Richard Whitaker. Following his graduation, he came to UC Berkeley with Moore.

At UC Berkeley, Lyndon taught from 1960 to 1964 as faculty for the Department of Architecture as the College of Environmental Design (CED) was beginning to form. He left to the University of Oregon to head the architecture department there. In 1967, Lyndon joined Massachusetts Institute of Technology (MIT) as a professor and later as head for their Department of Architecture as well. By 1979, he returned to CED, where he served in several long-term roles such as the Department of Architecture’s chair, faculty advisor, “a Chancellor’s Professor, and the first Eva Li Professor of Architecture and Urban Design, now Emeritus,” until 2004 when he retired.

From 1978, he worked with Marvin Buchanan and founded their firm Lyndon/Buchanan Architects in Berkeley, California until 2006.

== Notable works ==
Donlyn Lyndon was a founding member of a Berkeley architecture firm named Moore, Lyndon, Turnbull and Whitaker (MLTW). Lyndon was part of The Sea Ranch’s original design team, a planned community on the Sonoma Coast. The goal of the project was to blend the buildings into the land, something that Lyndon later referred to as a “limited partnership” between the buildings and the land. In The Sea Ranch (2004), co-written with photographer Jim Alinder, Lyndon wrote that he and the other architects working on the project were working with the “conviction that the buildings can and should become a part of the encompassing landscape; not by pretending to disappear from view, but by developing forms that are sympathetic to the forces that have shaped that environment.” Condominium 1, designed by MLTW in 1963 to 64 and completed in 1965, was the clearest expression of this approach. Its vertical redwood board cladding was left to weather, allowing it to blend into the natural landscape. Its slanted shed roofs protected the structure from the persistent winds of the west coast. When designing Condominium 1, Lyndon took inspiration from the architecture of the area citing a local barn, and a Bay area tradition of having exposed wood construction as having an impact on the project. These features became a model for later buildings at The Sea Ranch. Winning multiple awards on the year it opened, Condominium 1 is also the host of many awards such as the AIA 25 Year Award, and has been added to the National Register of Historic Places. Although best known for Condominium 1, Lyndon remained active in the Sea Ranch community until his death in 2026. He designed three houses on Sea Gate Row, one of them his own. He also served on the Sea Ranch Design Committee and chaired the Commons Landscape Committee.

== Bibliography ==
- Lyndon, Donlyn and Charles W. Moore. Chambers for A Memory Palace. Cambridge: MIT Press (1996). ISBN 0262621053
- Lyndon, Donlyn. The City Observed: Boston, a guide to the Architecture of the Hub. 1982. ISBN 0394748948
- Lyndon, Donlyn, Curtis W. Fentress, Robert Campbell, John Morris Dixon, Charles Jencks and Coleman Coker. Civic Builders. 2002. ISBN 0471498769
- Lyndon, Donlyn, Giancarlo De Carlo, Peter Smithson, Attilio Petruccioli and Francesco Smassa. The Eastern Lagoon Front. Venice: City of Venice (2001).
- Lyndon, Donlyn, Charles Moore, and Gerald Allen. The Place of Houses. Berkeley: University of California Press (2000). ISBN 0520223578
- Lyndon, Donlyn, Jim Alinder, Donald Cantry and Lawrence Halprin. The Sea Ranch: Fifty Years of Architecture, Landscape, Place, and Community on the Northern California Coast. Princeton: Princeton Architectural Press (2013). ISBN 1616891777
