= Bob Chinn =

Bob Chinn may refer to:

- Bob Chinn (film director) (born 1943), American adult film director
- Bob Chinn (restaurateur) (1923–2022), American owner of Bob Chinn's Crab House

== See also ==
- Bobby Chinn (born 1964), American international chef and television presenter
- Bobby Chinn (restaurant), restaurant in Hanoi, Vietnam
