= Nellie King Solomon =

American contemporary painter (born 1971)

- Born: 1971 (age 53–54); San Francisco, California, US
- Education: The Cooper Union; University of California, Santa Cruz; California College of the Arts
- Movement: Light and Space; Finish Fetish; Color Field
- Parent: Barbara Stauffacher Solomon
- Website: nelliekingsolomon.art

Nellie King Solomon (born 1971) is an American contemporary painter known for her large-scale abstract gestural paintings on Mylar. Her art explores themes of space, environment, control and its loss, materiality, and movement.

Solomon creates her abstract works by pouring and pushing paint, inks, and other materials, some potentially toxic, such as asphalt and soda ash, over translucent Mylar using custom tools.

Solomon's art practice incorporates elements of several different art movements, including the Light and Space movement, the Finish Fetish movement, and color field painting.

== Early life and education ==
Nellie King Solomon was born in 1971 in the North Beach neighborhood of San Francisco, California to architect Daniel Solomon and artist and designer Barbara Stauffacher Solomon, creator of Supergraphics. In an interview with The Project for Women, Solomon stated, "I come from a family of designers, authors, tv writers, hat makers, pianists and shrinks. In short, generations of Californian creative professionals who made their livings off their wits and taste."

Solomon reportedly struggled in French school and was later diagnosed with dyslexia. In her youth, Solomon trained in ballet for years but stopped due to foot issues.

Solomon attended the Urban School in San Francisco's Haight-Ashbury neighborhood. While in school, Solomon initially wanted to become an architect like her father and worked on an architectural restoration project in Venice, Italy. During her high school years, Solomon also worked as an artist assistant to David Ireland.

Solomon was accepted into Cooper Union’s School of Architecture in New York. After leaving Cooper Union, Solomon spent a gap year studying and traveling. She studied and worked in development and agriculture in Santa Cruz. She lived in New York, Paris, and Barcelona before returning to California to study art.

Upon her return to California, Solomon completed a BA in Art from the University of California, Santa Cruz. She also received her Master in Fine Arts at the California College of the Arts. Solomon has worked as a professor of art at Stanford University and California College of the Arts.

== Work and career ==
In 2001, shortly after graduating, Solomon had her first solo show.

Critics have noted her work encompasses both the micro and macro, sometimes in complete abstraction and at other times incorporating narrative visuals. In a review, David M. Roth wrote, "It’s impossible to say whether you’re seeing a magnified view of a molecular reaction or a vision of the Earth's crust from outer space," relating her work to the photographs of Edward Burtynsky and David Maisel.

Critics have situated Solomon's work within the canon of abstract painting. Roth notes elements of "the free-form splatter of Jackson Pollock, the staining of Helen Frankenthaler, the gravity-based dripping of Pat Steir, the hybrid smearing techniques invented by Ed Moses and the gritty surfaces of early Sam Francis." Kenneth Baker also places her work alongside the paintings of Sam Francis, Morris Louis and Helen Frankenthaler, adding that Solomon's narrow strip series "recall the marks left by melting ice in Andy Goldsworthy's icicle drawings."

Solomon has said, "Because I grew up in architecture... that sort of high modernism [is something] I both play off of and rebel against." She has also stated, "My work is like reaching into a dark velvet bag and pulling out everything you’re not supposed to talk about."

In 2019, Solomon moved from San Francisco to Los Angeles.

In 2024, Solomon held a survey show in San Francisco of works created between 1999 and 2024. Critic David M. Roth writes that the show combined elements of influence including race car driving (taught to her by her father), her early experimentation with materials, the works of her mother, Barbara Stauffacher Solomon, and responses to moving to and living in Los Angeles.

=== Art process ===
Solomon paints on Mylar, a material for architectural drawing, relating to her architectural training. She has stated her architectural background informs her "truth to materials" approach, using custom-made glass and dowel tools to stamp or spread pigments across her Mylar surfaces.

Solomon attributes the physical process of painting large-scale works to her surfing practice and ballet training, stating, "My growing up as a ballet dancer very much affects the way I hop around spaces and crawl over my table and push and pull the paint. I’m very physical with it."

Her work incorporates elements of the Light and Space movement, the Finish Fetish movement, and color field painting.

=== Works in conversation with Barbara Stauffacher Solomon ===
Nellie King Solomon collaborates with her mother, Barbara Stauffacher Solomon. The two have had numerous exhibitions together and share influences, yet maintain distinct approaches to art making.

Both were trained in architecture, although neither pursued licensure. They both create rules and grids and then challenge them. They both utilize Cartesian coordinates but for different purposes.

Although both artists share influences, Nellie King Solomon often diverges from her mother's hard-edged Swiss graphic design and modernism.

In a review by Pacific Sun Newspaper for their show SUPER-SILLY-US at the Marin Museum of Contemporary Art, executive director Amy Owen explains, "Nellie's work is abstract and irreverent, and has a kind of relationship to movement and the body ... Bobbie’s work is really informed by her meticulous training in Swiss graphic design with set rules behind it. That said, they were both trained as architects, and it’s interesting to see how each of them has taken that interest and translated it in very different ways through visual art."

==== Notable two-person museum exhibitions with Barbara Stauffacher Solomon ====
- In 2019–2020, their first two-person museum exhibition was held at the Scottsdale Museum of Contemporary Art, Arizona (SMOCA). The work of mother and daughter was shown in proximity for the first time. Both artists explored the physicality of the space and the potential of performance in constructing art.
- In March 2023, Solomon and Stauffacher Solomon had a second two-person exhibition held at the Marin Museum of Contemporary Art titled 'SUPER-SILLY-US' as part of MarinMOCA's annual Bay Area Legends exhibition series. During the exhibition, Solomon referenced her mother's Supergraphics by designing her version for a 1969 Ford Econoline used as part installation, and part bar for the exhibition.

== Exhibitions ==
Solomon has had exhibitions at:

- Brian Gross Fine Art, San Francisco, CA
- Ochi Projects LA, Los Angeles, CA
- Ochi Gallery, Sun Valley, ID
- Melissa Morgan Fine Arts, Palm Desert, CA
- N’Namdi Contemporary in Chicago, Detroit, and Miami
- Scottsdale Museum of Contemporary Art, Arizona (SMOCA)
- Marin Museum of Contemporary Art, Novato, CA

Group exhibitions have featured her work at:

- The Berkeley Art Museum and Pacific Film Archive, Berkeley, CA
- Crocker Art Museum, Sacramento, CA
- Bolinas Museum, Bolinas, CA, among others.

== Awards ==
Solomon has been nominated for the SECA Art Award multiple times.
