= Jacquelynn Baas =

American independent curator

Jacquelynn Baas is an independent curator, cultural historian, writer, and Director Emeritus of the University of California Berkeley Art Museum and Pacific Film Archive. She has published on topics ranging from the history of the print media to Mexican muralism to Fluxus to Asian philosophies and practices as resources for European and American artists.

== Early life and education ==
Jacquelynn Baas was born in Grand Rapids, Michigan, where she attended Grand Rapids Christian High School. As an undergraduate at Michigan State University she studied with Elizabeth Gilmore Holt, receiving her B.A. with a major in Art History in 1971. In 1973 Baas was awarded an M.A. with Certificate in Museum Practice from the University of Michigan; the following year she served as curatorial intern at the Grand Rapids Art Museum. In 1982 Baas was awarded a Ph.D. in Art History from the University of Michigan, earned while working as Registrar and then Assistant to the Director at the University of Michigan Museum of Art. Her dissertation topic, Auguste Lepère and the Artistic Revival of the Woodcut in France, 1875-1895, was the subject of a 1984 exhibition and catalogue co-authored with Richard S. Field.

== Museum affiliations ==
In 1982 Baas moved to Hanover, New Hampshire to serve as Chief Curator of the new Hood Museum of Art, Dartmouth College, then being designed by Charles W. Moore with Centerbrook Architects. In 1984 she was named Interim Director of the museum and the next year was appointed Director and presided over the opening of the new Hood Museum of Art. In 1988 Baas was named Director of the then-University Art Museum in Berkeley, California, securing an endowment gift to rename it the Berkeley Art Museum Pacific Film Archive a few years later. Named Director Emeritus in 1999, Baas returned to BAMPFA as Interim Director in 2007–08. In 2008-09 she served as Interim Director for the Mills College Art Museum. Museum directors who have worked under Baas include BAMPFA Director Lawrence Rinder, Philadelphia Museum of Art Director Timothy Rub, Princeton University Art Museum Director James Steward, and Aspen Art Museum Director Heidi Zuckerman.

== Exhibitions ==
Jacquelynn Baas has organized over thirty exhibitions, including the 1990 exhibition, The Independent Group: Postwar Britain and the Aesthetics of Plenty (ICA London; LAMOCA; BAMPFA; Hood Museum, Dartmouth; IVAM Valencia); No Boundary: Duchamp, Cage, and Mostly Fluxus at the 2006 Gwangju Biennale; and Fluxus and the Essential Questions of Life. The exhibition traveled from Dartmouth to the New York University Gray Art Gallery and the University of Michigan Museum of Art in 2011–2012. It was voted “Best Show in a University Gallery” by the American Chapter of the International Association of Art Critics. Berkeley Eye: Perspectives on the Collection was the first collection exhibition in the new building of the Berkeley Art Museum Pacific Film Archive (designed by Diller Scofidio + Renfro). In 2018, Baas curated BAMPFA's Art Wall: Land(e)scape 2018 by Barbara Stauffacher Solomon, the originator of Supergraphics in the 1960s.

== Scholarship and writing ==
In 2000 Baas co-founded with Mary Jane Jacob the arts consortium, Awake: Art, Buddhism, and the Dimensions of Consciousness, which over the course of its five-year existence generated some fifty exhibitions, educational programs, artist residencies, and two books: Buddha Mind in Contemporary Art (California 2004) and Smile of the Buddha: Eastern Philosophy and Western Art from Monet to Today (California 2005). Baas is co-editor of Learning Mind: Experience into Art (2010), and Chicago Makes Modern: How Creative Minds Changed Society (2012). She was editor and co-author of Fluxus and the Essential Questions of Life (2011), and has published a number of essays, including “The Epic of American Civilization” in Jose Clemente Orozco in the United States (Norton 2003), “Unframing Experience” in Learning Mind (cited above), “Before Zen: The Nothing of American Dada” in East-West Interchanges in American Art (Smithsonian Institution Scholarly Press, 2012), and “Agnes Martin: Readings for Writings” in Agnes Martin (2015). Her book Marcel Duchamp and the Art of Life was published by MIT Press in Fall 2019.
