= Bobby Chinn =

Chef, restaurateur, musician and TV host based in Hanoi, Vietnam

- Born: New Zealand
- Education: Richmond College (B.A.)
- Occupations: Chef; TV host; restaurateur; author
- Relatives: Saad el-Shazly (maternal grandfather)

Bobby Chinn is a New Zealand chef, television presenter, restaurateur and cookbook author. He is the host of Discovery TLC's World Cafe, and as a judge on MBC's Top Chef Middle East. He opened two restaurants in Vietnam – Restaurant Bobby Chinn in Hanoi (2001) and Bobby Chinn Saigon in Ho Chi Minh (2011), then relocated to London in 2014 and opened the House of Ho Vietnamese restaurant.

== Early life and education ==
Bobby Chinn was born in New Zealand to a Chinese-American father and an Egyptian mother. His grandfather was Egyptian military commander Saad El Shazly.

Chinn was educated at St. George's College in Cairo and Millfield in England before graduating from the Urban School of San Francisco. Chinn then graduated from Richmond College in London in 1986, where he earned a BA in finance and economics. In 2020 he was awarded an honorary Doctorate in Liberal Arts from Richmond College.

After graduating, Chinn worked as a research analyst in Boca Raton, Florida, then a hedge fund in San Francisco, before moving to New York City where he worked on the floor of the New York Stock Exchange.

== Career ==
Chinn's culinary career began at the Elka Restaurant in the Miyako Hotel in San Francisco, working under notable chefs Elka Gilmore and Traci Des Jardins. His big break came from Hubert Keller of Fleur de Lys, where he worked the pantry for a year. He was part of the opening team at the Coconut Grove on Van Ness Avenue, where he became the saucier, but succumbed to a back injury. He work-staged in France, then returned to San Francisco for back surgery.

In 1995, Chinn moved to Ho Chi Minh City and worked at La Camargue restaurant. Within six months, he had opened his own restaurant, Saigon Joe's, and moved to Hanoi to open another restaurant, Miro. In 1997, he opened the Red Onion, overlooking the infamous "Hanoi Hilton". The success of the restaurant gave him the opportunity to open his eponymous restaurant in 2001, Restaurant Bobby Chinn.

In 2014, Chinn moved to London and launched a modern Vietnamese concept at the House of Ho, which occupies the former site of the 2i's Coffee Bar, Soho.

=== Television ===
Chinn's television career was launched with his first solo TV show, World Café Asia, on TLC. For the second season, World Café Middle East, Chinn won "Best Entertainment Presenter" at the Asia Television Awards in 2007.

Chinn is a permanent judge on MBC's Top Chef Middle East.

=== Cookbook ===
Chin's cookbook, Wild Wild East: Recipes & Stories from Vietnam was released in 2007. It is both a guide to Vietnamese food and a diary of Chinn's adventures in Vietnam. In the foreword, Anthony Bourdain claims that "what Bobby doesn’t know about Southeast Asian food is not worth knowing".

=== Ambassador roles ===
- In 2012, he was appointed WWF Ambassador for Sustainable Seafood. As WWF's Sustainable Seafood Ambassador for the Coral Triangle, he helped WWF raise awareness on the importance of responsible seafood consumption, particularly in the Coral Triangle region, to help alleviate pressures on coastal and marine environments and dwindling fish populations.
- In 2014, he was appointed Tourism Ambassador for Vietnam in Europe.
- In 2021, he was appointed Goodwill Ambassador for the Naomi Tami Memorial Fund.
