= Urban School of San Francisco =

Coordinates: 37°46′15″N 122°26′46″W

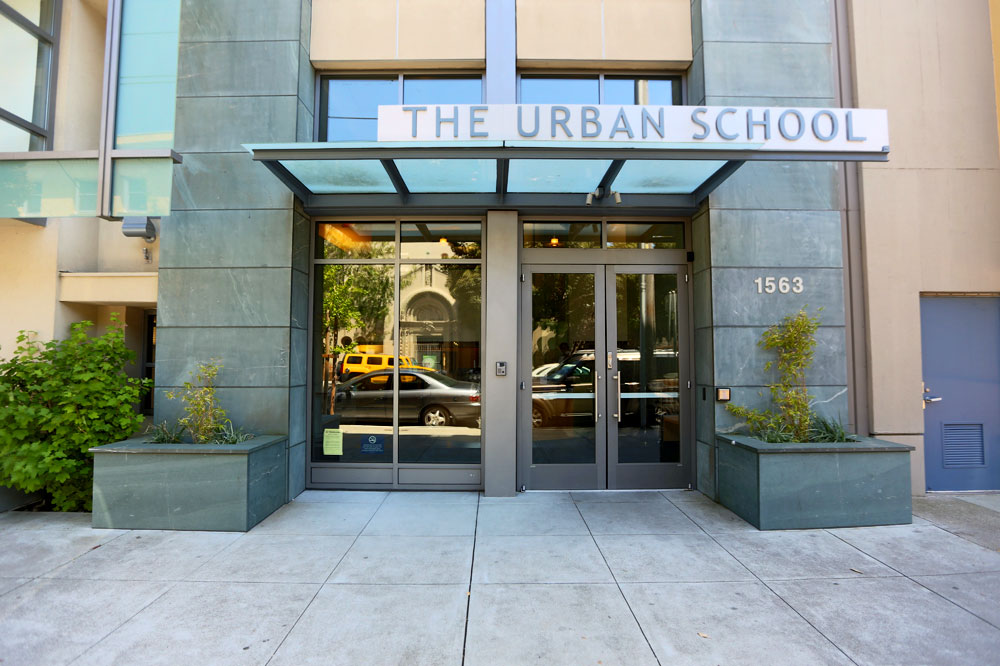
- South Campus: 1563 Page Street, San Francisco; North Campus: 1639 Oak Street, San Francisco

Information
- Type: Independent
- Established: 1966
- Head of school: Quinton P. Walker
- Faculty: 76
- Grades: 9 – 12
- Enrollment: ~420
- Campuses: Oak Street Campus, Page Street Campus
- Colors: Blue, Silver and White
- Athletics conference: Bay Counties League West
- Mascot: Blues
- Nickname: Urban
- Newspaper: The Urban Legend
- Website: urbanschool.org

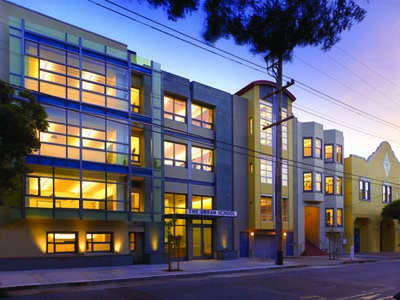
Urban School's Page Street Campus

Urban School of San Francisco is an independent high school located in the Haight-Ashbury district in San Francisco, California, United States.

== History ==
Urban was founded in 1966 by a group of Marin Country Day School parents. Urban has grown from 22 students into a student body of over 400.

== Leadership ==
After 32 years, Mark Salkind, a 1970 Urban graduate, retired as Head of School in June 2019. Dan B. Miller was appointed Head of School in July 2019. As of July 2025, Dr. Quinton P. Walker, previously the Assistant Head of School and Head of Upper School at the University School of Nashville, became the Head of School.

== Student life ==
Assistant Head of Student Life, Charlotte Worsley oversees Urban's over 40 student clubs, including 14 for-student by-student affinity spaces. Additionally, Urban has active student government, outdoor and class trips program, and a student newspaper, yearbook, and online literary and arts journal. Performing arts opportunities include fall and winter theater productions, circus class performances, and the annual One Acts Festival, as well as comprehensive jazz band, choral, and ensemble programs.

== Athletics ==
A member of the Bay Area Conference and Bay Counties League-West (BCL-West), Urban hosts title-winning interscholastic teams in baseball, basketball, cross-country, fencing, golf, lacrosse, soccer, softball, tennis and volleyball. Athletic practices and games are held in the Mark Salkind Center Gym and other venues throughout the city and in Golden Gate Park. Nearly 75 percent of all Urban students participate on 27 boys, girls and co-ed athletic teams in the department.

== Student newspaper ==
Urban's award-winning student newspaper, called "The Urban Legend," is a member of the National Scholastic Press Association.

== Notable alumni ==
Writing

- Frances Dinkelspiel, journalist, author and founder of news website Berkeleyside
- Hannah Dreier, Pulitzer Prize winning investigative reporter
- Molly Fisk, poet
- Phoebe Gloeckner, cartoonist, illustrator, painter, novelist
- Rebecca Walker, author, activist, producer, daughter of Alice Walker
- Maggie Nelson, author, poet
- David Sandner, author, editor
- Jacob Weisman, author, editor

Athletics

- Matt Deakin, Olympic and world champion rower
- Jené Morris, WNBA Guard
- Onome Ojo, former American football wide receiver in the NFL

Entertainment

- Alison Elliott, actress
- Beth de Araújo, film director, screenwriter
- Gypsy Snider, director, choreographer, former acrobat
- James Tom, comedian
- Zelda Williams, actress, director, producer, writer, daughter of actor Robin Williams

Artists and Musicians

- Gwendolyn DuBois Shaw, art historian, curator, and professor
- Ivy Getty, American heiress, model, and musician
- Gabby La La, vocalist and multi-instrumentalist
- Nellie King Solomon, contemporary painter
- Hannah Hooper, member of rock band Grouplove
- April Harper Grey a.k.a. Underscores, singer-songwriter and producer

Food Services

- Bobby Chinn, chef, restaurateur

Politics

- Maggy Krell, lawyer and politician currently serving in the California State Assembly

== See also ==
- San Francisco high schools
