= Traci Des Jardins =

American chef and restaurateur

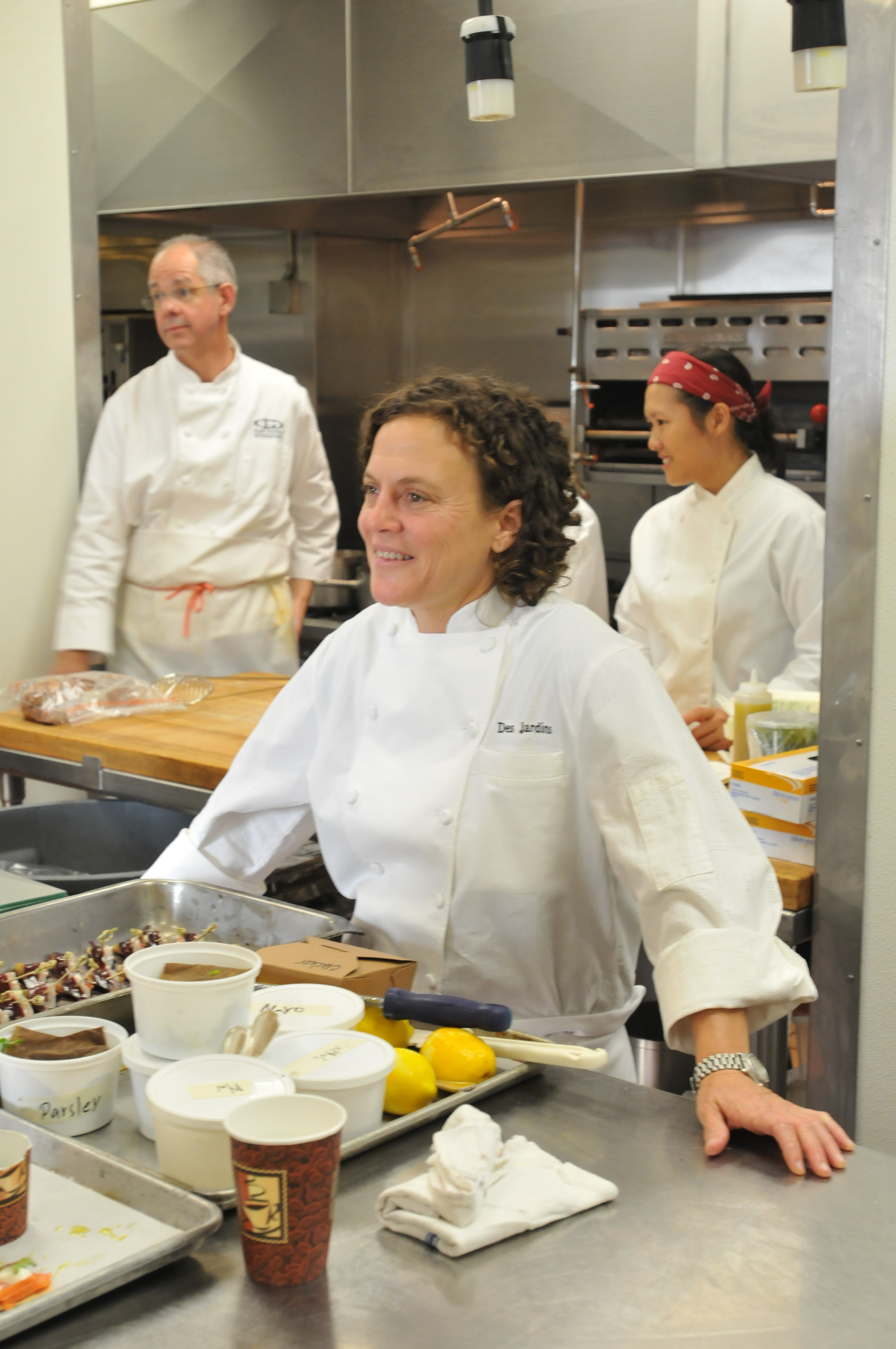
- Traci Des Jardins with Gary Danko in the background
- Born: November 15, 1965 (age 60); Firebaugh, California, U.S.
- Culinary career
- Previous restaurants
- Public House, San Francisco (2010–2024) * School Night, San Francisco (2018–2019) * Mijita, San Francisco (2004–2019) * Jardinière, San Francisco (1997– 2019) * Commissary, San Francisco (2014–2021) * Arguello, San Francisco (2014–2021) * Transit Cafe (2015–2019) * El Alto, Los Altos (2022–2022)
- Television shows
- Iron Chef America (2005); The Next Iron Chef (2007); Masters (season 3) (2011); "Guy's Grocery Games"
- Awards
- Rising Star Chef of the Year – James Beard Foundation Award 1995; Best Chef: Pacific – James Beard Foundation Award 2007
- Website: www.tracidesjardins.com

Traci Des Jardins is an American chef and restaurateur who previously owned Jardinière, a French influenced California fine-dining restaurant in the Hayes Valley neighborhood of San Francisco, California.

== Biography ==
Des Jardins was raised on a farm in Firebaugh, California, near Fresno. Her father is of French Acadian descent, and her mother's family is from the Mexican state of Sonora. Her maternal grandparents, Angela and Miguel Salazar, lived in a small house nearby, and Des Jardins has many strong childhood memories of her grandmother preparing flour tortillas. The Des Jardins' dinner table featured produce from the garden and game from the land in dishes which reflected her family's Mexican and Louisianan-French Acadian heritage.

Des Jardins apprenticed at several three-star French restaurants, including La Maison Troisgros, and was executive chef at Joachim Splichal's Patina in Los Angeles. Later, she worked at notable San Francisco restaurants Aqua, Elka, and Rubicon before opening Jardinière in 1997.

== Philosophy ==
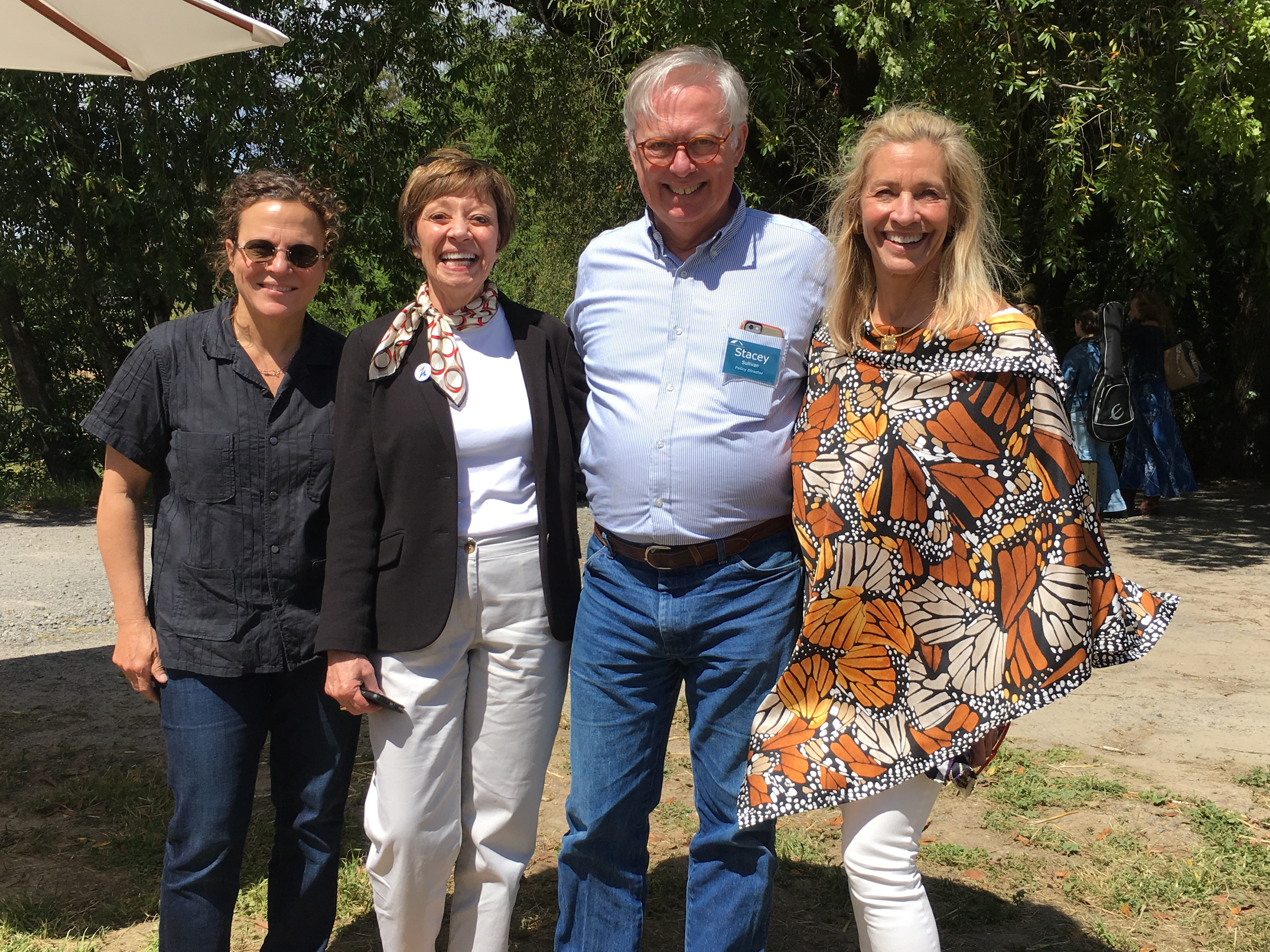
Des Jardins (left) with Karen Ross, J. Stacey Sullivan, and Joy Sterling, CEO of Iron Horse Vineyards in 2017

Des Jardins uses locally sourced, organic, seasonal ingredients whenever possible, and prefers sourcing from smaller, sustainable farming and ranching operations.

== Awards ==
In 2007, Des Jardins won the James Beard Foundation Award for best chef in the Pacific region. In 1995, she was named the James Beard Foundation's "Rising Star Chef of the Year". She has won Food & Wine magazine's "Best New Chef" title, and San Francisco magazine's "Chef of the Year" award. Jardinière was named Esquire magazine's "Best New Restaurant", and was also nominated as a "Best New Restaurant" by the James Beard Foundation.

== Television appearances ==
Traci Des Jardins competed on season 3 of Top Chef: Masters, which debuted April 6, 2011; she was a runner-up. She also appeared on an episode of Iron Chef America in 2005, in which she defeated Mario Batali. Later, she competed in The Next Iron Chef but was eliminated in the first episode.

Traci Des Jardins was also a judge on season 18 of Hell's Kitchen during a challenge in episode 4.

Traci Des Jardins has also appeared as a judge on Guy's Grocery Games – $12 Meal Showdown.

== Restaurants ==
=== Closed ===
- Jardinière (September 1997 – April 2019), San Francisco
- Public House (2010–2024), Oracle Park, San Francisco
- School Night (2018–2020), Dogpatch, San Francisco
- Mijita Cocina Mexicana (2004 – December 29, 2019), Ferry Building, San Francisco
- Mijita (2010–2015), Oracle Park, San Francisco
- Commissary (May 2014–2021), Presidio, San Francisco
- Arguello (2014–2021), Presidio, San Francisco
- Transit Café (April 2015 – November 2019), Presidio, San Francisco, closed for the construction of the Presidio Tunnel Tops project.
- El Alto (2022), State Street Market, Los Altos, California (Vacated in 2023)

·"'Yarrow'" (November 2025- Present), Sugar Bowl Resort, Norden, California
