= Tony Esnault =

French chef

- Born: Tony Esnault
- Education: François Rabelais culinary school
- Occupation: Chef
- Spouse: Yassmin Sarmadi

Tony Esnault is a French chef and restaurateur at Knife Pleat, a Michelin-starred French restaurant in Costa Mesa, California.

== Early years ==
Born in Saumur, France, Esnault was inspired by his grandmother's cooking which developed his love for cooking and fine ingredients. Esnault studied at François Rabelais culinary school in Lyon, France before going to work for Carré des Feuillants in Paris. Then he went to work for one-Michelin star rated Montparnasse 25, and L’Auberge de l’Île in Alsace. In 1996, he went to work at Louis XV in Monte Carlo where he worked with chef Alain Ducasse.

Esnault moved to San Francisco and was sous chef at the Ritz Carlton in San Francisco until 2002.

By 2004, Esnault was working as executive chef at the Ritz Carlton in Boston where he was named “Best Hotel Chef of America” by Food & Wine Magazine.

In 2005, Esnault moved to New York City to again work with Ducasse and became executive chef at Alain Ducasse at the Essex House where they had a Michelin rating of 3 stars. In 2007, he opened Adour at the St. Regis. His work with Ducasse earned the restaurants a combined five Michelin stars, three stars from The New York Times, and he was also named StarChef's “Rising Star.”

== Patina ==
In 2009, Esnault had relocated to Los Angeles and was working at Patina located in the Walt Disney Concert Hall. During his tenure at Patina, the restaurant received high praise including a Michelin star as well as a four-star review from the Los Angeles Times in 2010.

== Church & State ==
In 2012, Esnault joined Church & State, a French bistro founded by Yassmin Sarmadi in 2008.

== Spring ==
In February 2016, Esnault and his now wife, Yassmin Sarmadi, opened Spring, a French restaurant located in Downtown Los Angeles.

== Knife Pleat ==
In 2019, Esnault and Sarmadi, opened Knife Pleat at South Coast Plaza in Costa Mesa, California. In 2021, the restaurant was awarded one Michelin star.
