= Onome Ojo =

Nigerian American football player (born 1977)

No. 86, 15
- Position: Wide receiver

Personal information
- Born: June 3, 1977 (age 49); San Jose, California, U.S.
- Listed height: 6 ft 4 in (1.93 m)
- Listed weight: 205 lb (93 kg)

Career information
- High school: The Urban School (San Francisco, California)
- College: UC Davis
- NFL draft: 2001: 5th round, 153rd overall pick

Career history
- New Orleans Saints (2001); Rhein Fire (2002); Tampa Bay Buccaneers (2002–2003)*; San Diego Chargers (2003)*
- * Offseason or practice squad member only

Awards and highlights
- Super Bowl champion (XXXVII)

Onome Johnson Ojo (born June 3, 1977) is a Nigerian former professional American football wide receiver in the National Football League (NFL). He also played in NFL Europe. Ojo played college football at UC Davis.

== Early life and education ==
Onome Ojo was born on June 3, 1977, in San Jose, California, to Nigerian parents. His name means "gift from God" in Nigerian. He attended The Urban School of San Francisco before going to college at UC Davis. He played tennis, basketball, and soccer in high school. He didn't play football until after two years of college, when Ojo told coach Bob Biggs that he was interested in playing football. “When Onome first came in the office I thought he was a basketball player and was lost,” the coach said, “Then he said he was interested in playing football. I thought he was a JC kid, so I asked him where he played. He said he had never played.” During practice, Biggs said that Ojo was "a pretty impressive athlete" but was far from being a player. “He didn’t know a Go route from an Out route. He was the rawest football player I have ever seen.” Biggs said “But you could see there was something special. Plus, Onome is a very bright young man with a tremendous work ethic. He has developed his skills now to where he can catch the ball, run the routes. What he lacks is instincts, the things a lot of kids learn because they have been playing so long." He appeared in five games during the season, but failed to catch as pass. The next season, he caught 18 passes for 366 yards and two touchdowns, including one of 86 yards. He caught 33 passes in his senior year, gaining 865 yards and 11 touchdowns.

== Professional career ==
In a pre-draft workout in front of National Football League (NFL) teams, only one team showed up, the New Orleans Saints. They would be the team to draft him, selecting him with the 153rd pick of the 2001 NFL draft. He was signed on July 17. He spent time on the practice squad and inactive list for the Saints in 2001, and did not make any appearances. The following season he was sent to the Rhein Fire of NFL Europe. He played in eight games with them, catching 11 passes for 111 yards and one touchdown. He was released by the Saints in 2002 at roster cuts. After being released he was signed by the Tampa Bay Buccaneers to the practice squad. He was later placed on injured reserve. Ojo won a Super Bowl ring after the Buccaneers defeated the Oakland Raiders in Super Bowl XXXVII. He was released the next season. He was then signed by the San Diego Chargers, but released shortly afterwards.

== Later life ==
After his sports career he became a police officer in Richmond, California.
