= Patina (restaurant) =

Defunct restaurant in Los Angeles, California, U.S.

- Interactive map of Patina

Restaurant information
- Established: 1989
- Closed: 2020
- Head chef: Joachim Splichal
- Location: 141 South Grand Avenue, Los Angeles, California, 90012, United States
- Coordinates: 34°3′17.7″N 118°14′59.1″W

Patina was a restaurant in Los Angeles, California. The restaurant had received a Michelin star.

Chef Joachim Splichal first opened the restaurant in 1989 on Melrose Avenue, where Providence is located.

In 2003, Patina moved to the first floor of the Walt Disney Concert Hall, and subsequently received a Michelin star in 2007. Over the years, Patina received praise for its French-style cuisine under then-chef Tony Esnault, particularly from Los Angeles Times restaurant critic S. Irene Virbila, who awarded it four stars in 2010.

In 2016, former LA Weekly critic Besha Rodell gave it just two stars out of five. After that review, Splichal hired longtime Patina Group chef Andreas Roller in 2017 as executive chef. Patina closed during the COVID-19 pandemic and never reopened.

== See also ==
- List of defunct restaurants of the United States
- List of Michelin-starred restaurants in California
