= Barbara Stauffacher Solomon =

American landscape architect (1928–2024)

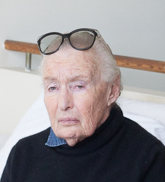
- Stauffacher Solomon in 2016
- Born: Barbara Ethel Levé; December 5, 1928; San Francisco, California, U.S.
- Died: May 7, 2024 (aged 95); San Francisco, California, U.S.
- Education: San Francisco Art Institute; Basel Art Institute; University of California, Berkeley
- Occupations: Graphic designer, Landscape architect
- Spouses: Frank Stauffacher (m. 1948; died 1955) Daniel Solomon (m. 1969, divorced)
- Children: 2, including Nellie King Solomon

Barbara Ethel Stauffacher Solomon (née Levé; December 5, 1928 – May 7, 2024) was an American landscape architect, graphic designer, and artist. She was best known for her large-scale interior supergraphics and the exterior signs at Sea Ranch, a private estate with a Utopian vision in Sonoma County, California.

== Early life and education ==
Barbara "Bobbie" Ethel Levé was born on December 5, 1928 in San Francisco, California to Fred Levé and Lilian Reinhertz Levé. She was a third-generation San Franciscan. Her father, Fred was a lawyer who represented anarchists. Her parents separated when she was 4 years old. As a young woman, Barbara Levé studied dance and worked as a dancer, as well as, studying painting and sculpture at San Francisco Art Institute.

At age 20, she married the filmmaker Frank Stauffacher in 1948. The designer and printmaker Jack Stauffacher became her brother-in-law through this marriage. Frank and Barbara Stauffacher had a daughter named Chloe.

In 1956, after her husband unexpectedly died from a brain tumor, Barbara Stauffacher moved to Basel, Switzerland to study graphic design at the Basel Art Institute, where she was a student of Armin Hofmann until 1959. She had made the decision to study graphic design because she knew she could make a living in that field. She later studied architecture at the University of California, Berkeley graduating in 1981. She wrote her graduation thesis on Green Architecture and the Agrarian Garden.

In 1969, she married Daniel Solomon, an architect and professor. Their daughter, Nellie King Solomon, also became an artist and has shown her work at exhibitions with Stauffacher Solomon.

== Career ==
Stauffacher Solomon returned to San Francisco in 1962 and set up her graphic design studio. During that period of her career, she designed the monthly program guides for the San Francisco Museum of Modern Art.

Cover of the Sea Ranch brochure designed by Barbara Stauffacher Solomon that includes her design of the logo for the development

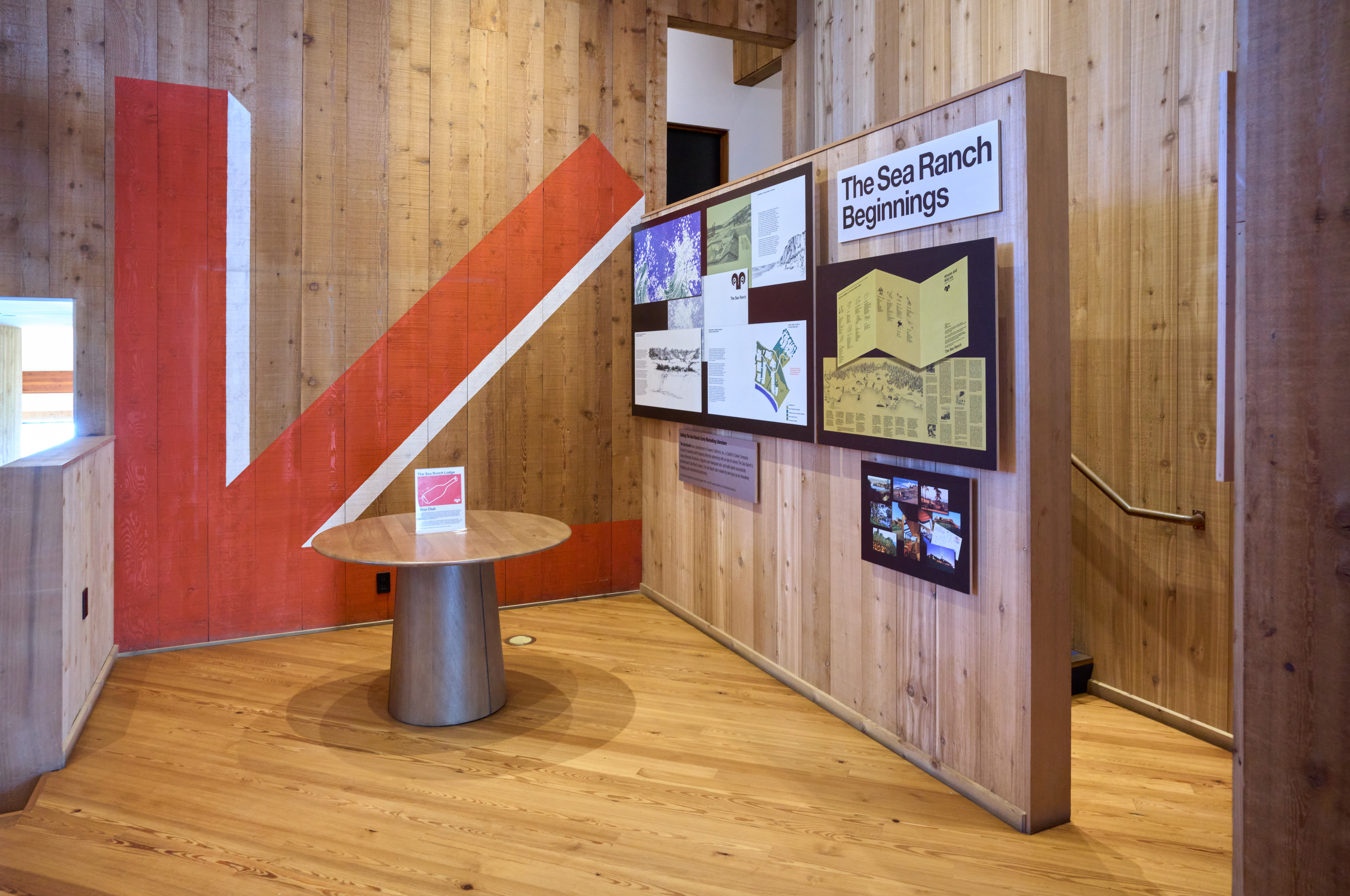
Visitor information area at Sea Ranch Lodge

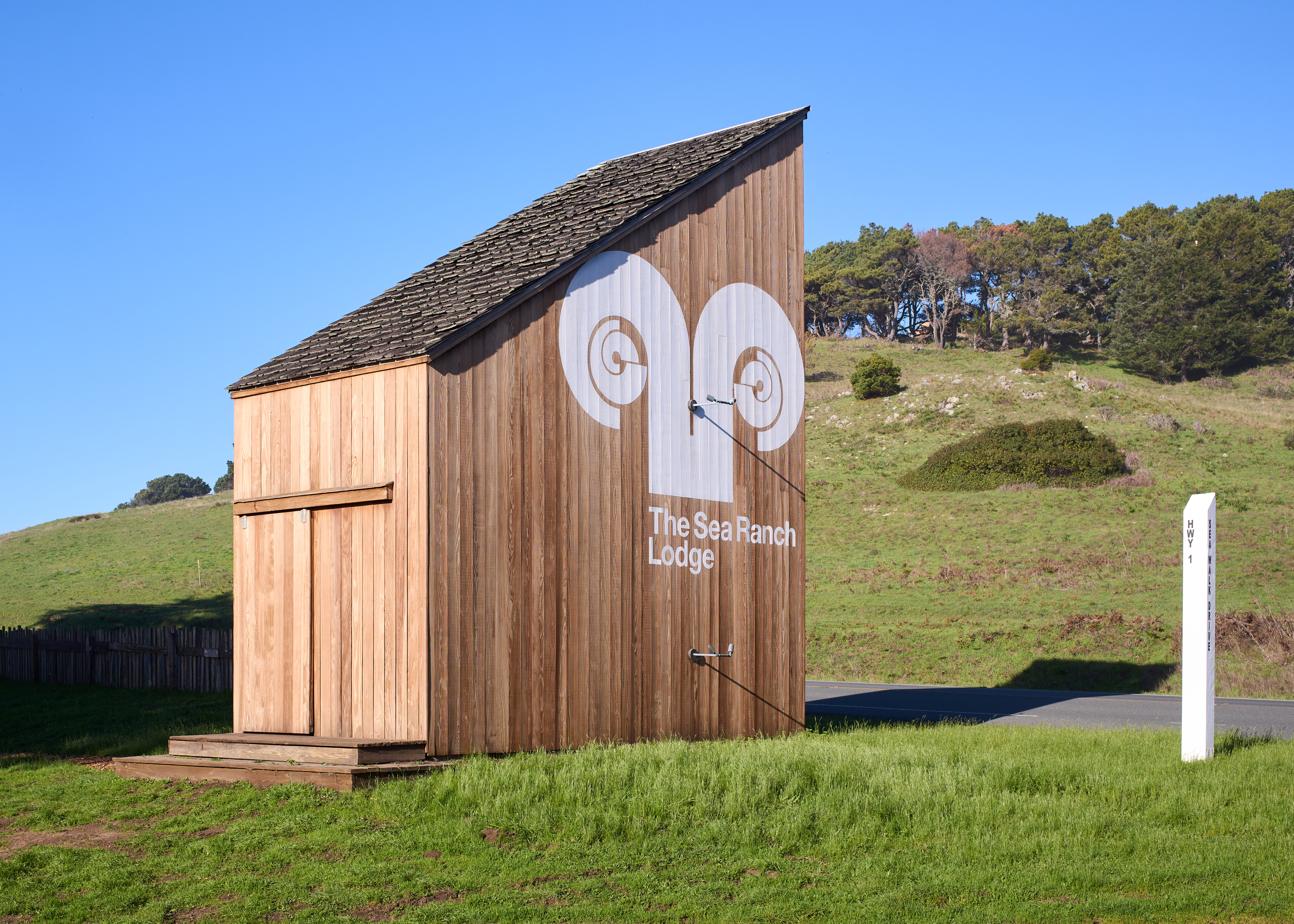
Sea Ranch Lodge entry sign

Stauffacher Solomon met landscape architect Lawrence Halprin in 1968 and he employed her at Sea Ranch, a novel condominium development along ten miles of the California coast in Sonoma County. Initially, she designed the architectural scale paintings for the building interiors. Her work at Sea Ranch grew from her vocabulary of signs to creating motion and an awareness of space throughout the project. Working within tight budgetary constraints, Stauffacher Solomon used large-scale painted graphics, now known as supergraphics, to create a low-cost signage system for the development. She created the logo for the Sea Ranch that drew from Swiss design and California impressionism to interpret the rams and crashing waves associated with the massive property. Halprin went on to recommend her to other architects in the San Francisco area who gave her a free rein in the creation of designs that exhibited her talent. She went on to receive two American Institute of Architects (AIA) awards for her work at Sea Ranch.

Stauffacher Solomon was an instructor at both Harvard University and Yale University during her career. While at Yale, an architect she had met during her work at Sea Ranch, Charles Moore, invited her to lead a studio project on supergraphics in 1968. The studio was a week-long project creating two-dimensional graphics that reinforced the architecture of the Yale University Art and Architecture elevators. Her studio project was wildly successful and heralded by Ada Louise Huxtable as a protest against "the establishment".

In the short period of its existence as a magazine, Stauffacher Solomon was art director of Scanlan's Monthly from 1970 until 1971.

In 1995, she designed a large outdoor art installation, Promenade Ribbon, for San Francisco. In 2002, Stauffacher Solomon was a member of the San Francisco Art Commission. In 2015, Stauffacher Solomon worked as a landscape architect and continued to create large scale graphic interventions outdoors.

A large-scale outdoor art installation by Stauffacher Solomon titled Welcome was exhibited in St. Moritz, Switzerland between 2022–2023.

Stauffacher Solomon is the author of the autobiographic book Why? Why not?. In 2016, Stauffacher Solomon was featured in the eighth book from Hall of Femmes featuring women in art direction and design.

== Death ==
Stauffacher Solomon died in San Francisco on May 7, 2024, at the age of 95.

== Exhibitions ==
Drawings and supergraphics by Stauffacher Solomon have been included in a number of museum exhibitions, including at The Graham Foundation, Palm Springs Art Museum, Marin MOCA, Scottsdale Museum of Contemporary Art, Walker Art Center, and Whitney Museum of American Art. In 2018, she created the supergraphic installation entitled Land(e)scape 2018 at the Berkeley Art Museum.

In 2019, she was the subject of a solo exhibition at the San Francisco Museum of Modern Art (SFMOMA).

From March to May 2021, another solo show of the work of Barbara Stauffacher Solomon, entitled Green Rectangle of Paradise (GROP), was held at Gallery Van Bartha in Basel. The show was curated by Matylda Krzykowski and showcased more than forty drawings and paintings by the artist, dating from 1980s to 2021. Krzykowski had introduced Stauffacher Solomon to the gallery.

A posthumous solo exhibition of her work is planned to open at Yerba Buena Center for the Arts in early 2027.

== Books ==
- Green Architecture: Notes on the Common Ground (Design quarterly 120), 1982.
- Green Architecture and the Agrarian Garden, 1988. ISBN 0847809072
- Good Mourning California (1 ed.). New York, New York: Rizzoli International Publishers. 1992. ISBN 978-0847815425.
- Why? Why Not?, 2013. ISBN 9780988554627
- Utopia Myopia, 2013. ISBN 9780988554610
- Making the Invisible Visible, 2018.
