= Knife Pleat =

- Interactive map of Knife Pleat

Restaurant information
- Established: 2019; 7 years ago
- Owners: Tony Esnault; Yassmin Sarmadi
- Head chef: Tony Esnault
- Food type: French cuisine
- Location: 3333 S. Bristol Street (located in the penthouse of South Coast Plaza), Costa Mesa, Orange County, California, 92626, United States
- Coordinates: 33°41′30″N 117°53′22″W
- Seating capacity: ~80
- Website: www.knifepleat.com

Knife Pleat is a French restaurant run by chef Tony Esnault and his wife and restaurateur Yassmin Sarmadi in Costa Mesa, California.

Esnault and Sarmadi are best known for creating Los Angeles restaurants Spring and Church & State

Knife Pleat is located in the penthouse of South Coast Plaza and seats approximately 80 people in two dining areas.

In 2021, the restaurant was awarded one Michelin star. It lost its star in 2026.

Knife Pleat offers a Saturday afternoon tea service.

== See also ==
- List of French restaurants
- List of Michelin-starred restaurants in California
