= Bobby Chinn (restaurant) =

Restaurant in Hanoi, Vietnam

Coordinates: 21.0661°N 105.8265°E

Bobby Chinn is a restaurant in Hanoi, Vietnam, situated near the perimeter of the Old Quarter, overlooking Hoàn Kiếm Lake. It is run by American chef Bobby Chinn. It serves a mixture of Californian, French, and Vietnamese cuisine, as well as a variety of international tapas-style dishes.

== Description ==
Chinn had previously run several restaurants in Vietnam following his training in France, and his work in California. He opened his self-titled restaurant in 2000 near the Hoàn Kiếm Lake, but following increases in rent, it was moved to the Tây Hồ district of Hanoi. The interior of the restaurant features artwork from Chinn's private collection, and is divided into two dining rooms and a lounge. A further branch of the restaurant is in Ho Chi Minh City.

=== Menu ===
Reflective of the city's "increasingly cosmopolitan tastes", the restaurant serves Californian, French, and Vietnamese cuisine. This includes Chinn's variations on traditional Vietnamese cuisine, using the influences from his training in France. These include spring rolls filled with filet mignon, as well as crab cakes with a tamarind glaze on chive flowers. There is also a variety of internationally influenced tapas-style dishes, such as a Moroccan-style braised squid. One of the most well-known dishes is green-tea smoked duck, served with wasabi mashed potato.

== Reception ==
In 2010, the Vietnam Investment Review ranked Restaurant Bobby Chinn as the fifth best restaurant in Hanoi. In 2014, it was ranked as the 60th best restaurant worldwide by US website The Daily Meal.
