= Gwendolyn DuBois Shaw =

American art historian (born 1968)

- Born: September 26, 1968 (age 58)
- Movement: Modernism
- Website: Gwendolyn DuBois Shaw

Gwendolyn DuBois Shaw (born September 26, 1968) is an art historian, curator, and professor of American art at the University of Pennsylvania. She has curated major exhibitions and published several books on African American art. In 2019, she became director of history, research and scholarship and senior historian at the National Portrait Gallery in Washington, D.C.

== Career ==
Shaw received her BA from the University of California, Santa Barbara and her PhD in American art at Stanford University. She was a fellow at both Romare Bearden Graduate Museum, which supported her work at the Saint Louis Art Museum and the Radcliffe Institute at Harvard University.

Shaw became an assistant professor of History of Art and Architecture and of African and African American Studies at Harvard University, teaching there for five years. Shaw is currently an associate professor at the University of Pennsylvania. Her research focuses on issues of race, gender, sexuality, and class in American art, particularly as they relate to conflict. In 2019, she was appointed director of history, research and scholarship and senior historian at the National Portrait Gallery in Washington, D.C.

== Writing ==
Shaw has published three books on African American art: Seeing the Unspeakable: The Art of Kara Walker (2004), Portraits of a People: Picturing African Americans in the Nineteenth Century (2006), and most recently, Represent: 200 Years of African American Art in the Philadelphia Museum of Art (2014). She was previously the visual arts editor of Transition Magazine.

== Curation ==
Shaw curated the exhibition Portraits of a People: Picturing African Americans in the Nineteenth Century (2006) at the Addison Gallery of American Art in Andover, Massachusetts. She curated Samba Sessao: Afro-Brazilian Art and Film for the Arthur Ross Gallery at the University of Pennsylvania in 2012. She was a consulting curator of the exhibition Represent: 200 Years of African American Art (2015) at the Philadelphia Museum of Art. She has co-created a number of exhibitions with her students, including Trouble in Paradise: The Art of Polynesian Warfare at the University of Pennsylvania Museum of Archaeology and Anthropology in 2006. As a teacher of the Spiegel-Wilks Seminar in Contemporary Art in 2016, she worked with students to curate the show Do/Tell at the Institute of Contemporary Art, Philadelphia. In 2020, as a senior historian at the National Portrait Gallery, she organized Every Eye is Upon Me, an exhibit which explores the lives of the first ladies of the United States.

Shaw is active as a speaker and organizer of lectures and events at different institutions. In 2016, Shaw organized a symposium at the National Portrait Gallery on "Racial Masquerade in American Art and Culture".

== Awards ==
In 2015, Shaw received the Dean's Award for Innovation in Teaching from the School of Arts & Sciences at the University of Pennsylvania, for "exceptional creativity and innovation in instruction".
