= Joachim Splichal =

German chef

Joachim Splichal is a celebrity chef based in Los Angeles, California. In 1991, he was declared "Best California Chef" by the James Beard Foundation. Four years later in 1995, he was inducted into their "Who's Who of Food & Beverage in America". Splichal is best known for his fine dining restaurant Patina located in the Walt Disney Concert Hall (formerly on Melrose Avenue), his chain of Pinot restaurants, and the Patina Restaurant Group.

== Early life ==
Joachim Splichal was born and raised in Spaichingen, Germany. At age 18, he began in the hotel industry, working at leading hotels in Canada, Morocco, Israel, Sweden, Norway, and Switzerland. In his early twenties, he moved to France to start his culinary training, working as a saucier at La Bonne Auberge, a Michelin-starred restaurant in Antibes in southeastern France. At age 23, Splichal was hired as a sous chef by Jacques Maximin to work at the Chantecler restaurant in the Hotel Negresco in Nice. Maximin became Splichal's mentor and during this period he began to win many culinary awards, including the "Youngest and Most Creative Chef" title from the Cercle Epicurean Society.

== Culinary experience in the U.S. ==
Splichal moved to the United States in 1981 to serve as Executive Chef at the Regency Club in Los Angeles. In the years that followed, he worked at the Seventh Street Bistro and began Max Au Triangle. Splichal opened Patina in 1989 in Hollywood with his wife Christine, an international business expert. Patina relocated to the Walt Disney Concert Hall in 2003, and received a Michelin star in 2007. The restaurant was closed permanently in 2020. From 1994 until its closing, the restaurant was the recipient of the Wine Spectator Grand Award.
