= Marin Museum of Contemporary Art =

Contemporary art museum in California, U.S.

Coordinates: 38°3′28″N 122°31′6″W

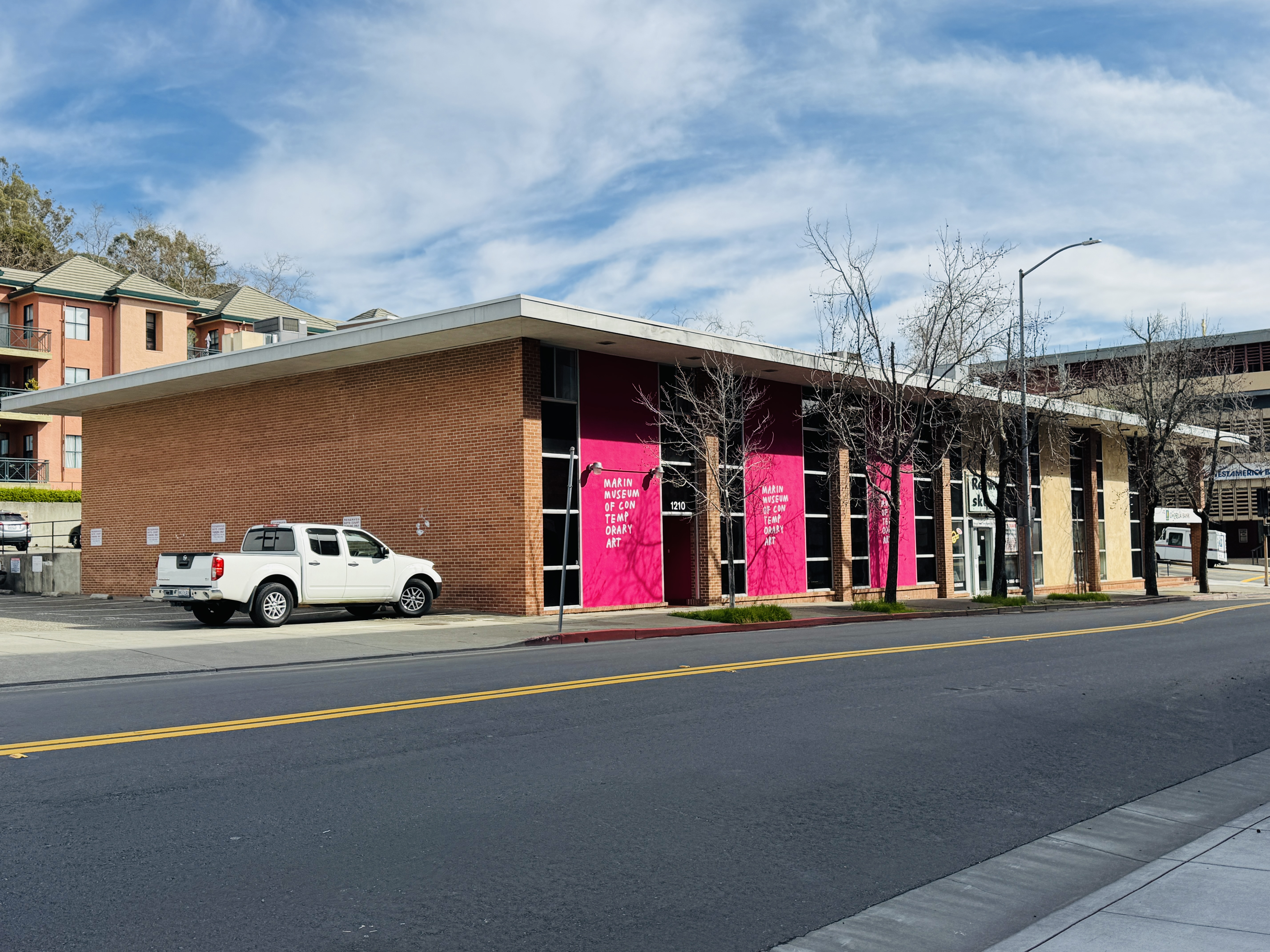
The Marin Museum of Contemporary Art in San Rafael, Calif. in February 2025.

The Marin Museum of Contemporary Art (MarinMOCA) was founded in 2007 and is located in San Rafael, California, United States. The museum includes several galleries, over fifty artist studios, a classroom wing for studio art classes, and a museum store.

== About ==
The MarinMOCA presents over ten contemporary art exhibitions each year including paintings, prints, photography, multi-media works, ceramics and sculpture. The exhibitions feature a broad selection of local, national and international artists.

MarinMOCA is a membership organization with more than 150 member artists whose work is displayed semi-annually in the galleries. In partnership with the City of Novato, the museum offers an artist-in-residence program which includes public programming, such as workshops and classes. MarinMOCA provides annual art enrichment programs for public schools and offers more than 200 studio art classes for adults.

== History ==
The MarinMOCA was founded in 2007. Predecessors to MarinMOCA included the founding of the Indian Valley Artist group from College of Marin in 1983, and a studio space at Hamilton Air Force Base in 1993 for this group, followed by a gallery in 2005.

MarinMOCA is known for its annual Altered Book Exhibition and Fundraiser which displays 150 book art creations which are auctioned to the public. Since 1998, the organization has presented the Legends of the Bay Area exhibition each spring which honors a celebrated San Francisco Bay Area artist.

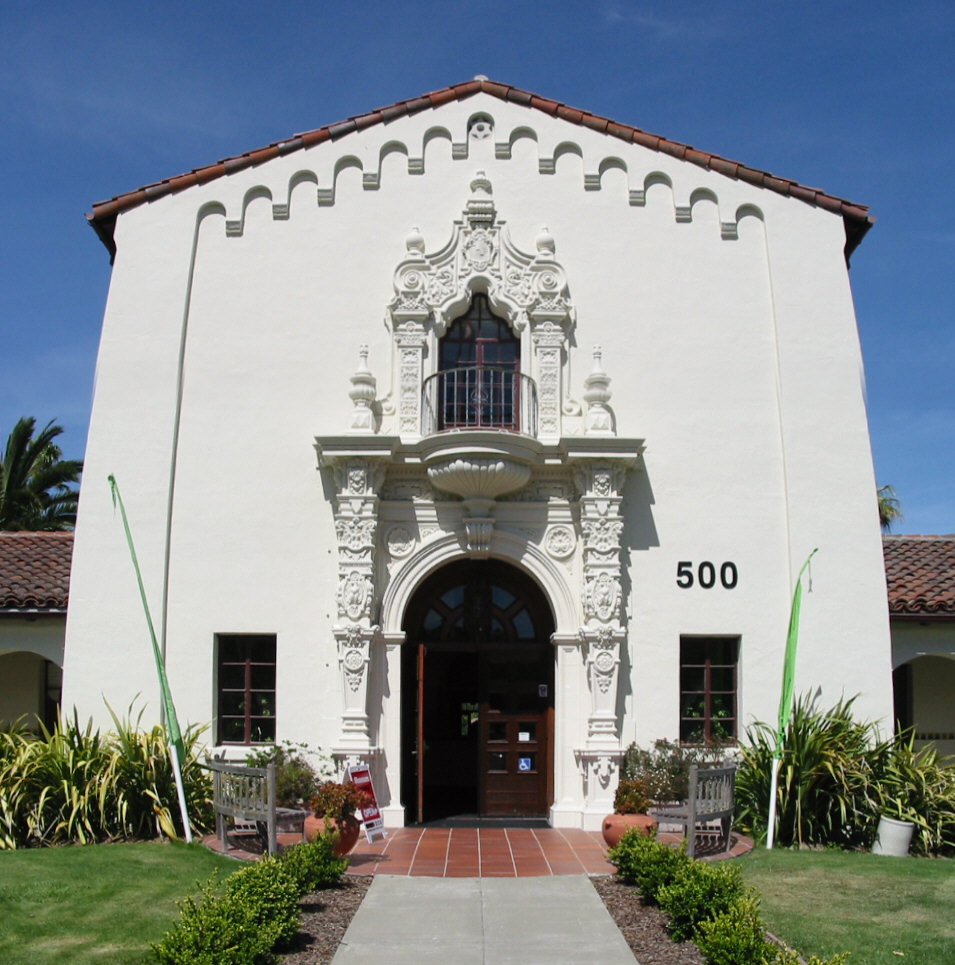
Exterior view of the Headquarters Building 500 where the museum was once located.

The 1,700 square feet (160 m^{2}) museum was housed within Marin County's Novato Art Center in Building 500, once the Headquarters of the decommissioned Hamilton Air Force Base. The architectural style, resembling a California mission, was in keeping with the airfield's Spanish eclectic style with features such as reinforced concrete, stucco exteriors, hollow tile, and Mission tile roofs. The front facade is fashioned of California Churrigueresque concrete castings. The interior includes concrete beams painted to resemble wood.

The museum is currently located in downtown San Rafael.
