= Supergraphics =

Decorative graphics in a building or interior space

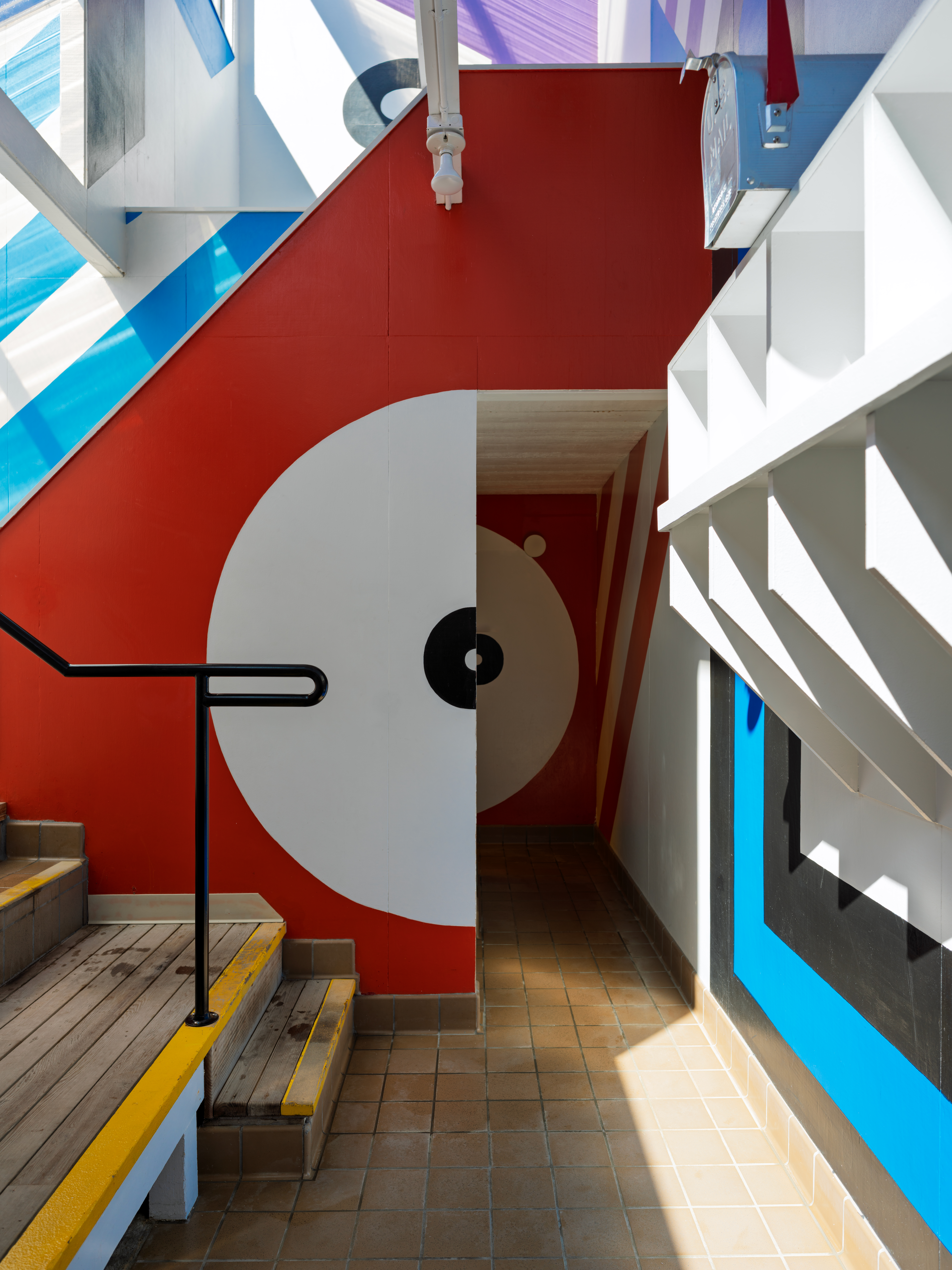
Locker room at Moonraker Athletic Center at Sea Ranch, California, designed by architect Charles Moore. Painted graphics on the walls of the space, by Barbara Stauffacher Solomon, are an example of supergraphics.

Supergraphics are large-scale painted or applied decorative graphics used over interior or exterior walls, floors, or ceilings in order to alter visual perception of a building or interior space. Supergraphics typically wrap around multiple architectural planes or surfaces, and change appearance of spaces by affecting perception of their size or depth.

Supergraphics are one of the tools of environmental graphic design that can allow to incorporate wayfinding or branding in public spaces like transit hubs, office buildings, hospitals, or schools. Supergraphics have also been used as a tool of urban renewal. Unlike murals, supergraphics are defined by their oversized scale and typically incorporate typography, multi-colored abstract graphic shapes, patterns, or illustrations.

== History ==
Supergraphics originated in mid-1960s and surged in popularity during the 1970s. Early practitioners of supergraphics included graphic designers Barbara Stauffacher Solomon, Morag Myerscough, Lance Wyman, and Deborah Sussman. Sea Ranch, a 1965 project by Barbara Stauffacher Solomon, introduced supergraphics to a wide American audience. After a decline in popularity in the decades that followed, supergraphics experienced a resurgence in 2000s.

The term supergraphics was first used by teacher and critic C. Ray Smith in 1967 to describe experimental work developed by the postmodern architectural movement of Supermannerists. Smith's definition of supergraphics excluded depiction of alphanumerics or figurative illustrations. Over time, the term had been expanded to include any large-scale architectural graphics that alter the viewer's perception of architectural environment. Modern interpretation of supergraphics also includes graphics that are projected digitally or displayed on screens.
