= Elka Gilmore =

American chef and restaurateur (1960–2019)

- Born: March 17, 1960; San Antonio, Texas, U.S.
- Died: July 6, 2019 (aged 59); San Francisco, California, U.S.
- Occupations: Chef, restaurateur
- Known for: Innovative dishes blending Asian and Western influences
- Culinary career
- Previous restaurants: * Camelion's, Santa Monica, * Elka, San Francisco, * Liberté, San Francisco, * Oodles, San Francisco

Elka Gilmore (March 17, 1960 – July 6, 2019) was an American chef and restaurateur. Her San Francisco restaurant, Elka, earned national acclaim. In 1994, she was nominated for the James Beard Foundation Award for Best California Chef.

== Early life ==
Elka Ruth Gilmore was born on March 17, 1960, in San Antonio, Texas. Her first restaurant job, as a dishwasher, was at Café Camille in Austin, when she was around 12 years old. She left home at age 16 to live with her grandmother in Madison, Wisconsin. As a teenager, she worked as a prep cook at L’Étoile in Madison; when the chef quit, Gilmore was promoted to chef.

At 18, she travelled to Boston, New York, and Provence (where she apprenticed at a restaurant in Cotignac), before settling in Los Angeles in 1982. There, she worked at restaurants Tumbleweed, Checkers, and Palette. She was the co-owner of Camelion's, which served French-inspired cuisine.

== Career ==
In 1991, at the age of 31, she opened her restaurant Elka in the Miyako Hotel in San Francisco's Japantown, serving a blend of Asian and French cuisine. The restaurant was met with national acclaim. The New York Times Magazine described the restaurant's dishes as "light and memorable" with "deep and husky flavors"; it called Gilmore "the enfant terrible of the modern California kitchen" and "an iconoclastic cook." In 1994, she was nominated for the James Beard Foundation's Award for Best California Chef.

In 1995, she opened Liberté, a French-American restaurant, in San Francisco. It closed after a few months. She was later hired by the Omni Berkshire Place Hotel in New York to open and run Kokachin, a seafood restaurant.

In 1998, she returned to San Francisco and opened Oodles, an Asian fusion restaurant; it closed shortly thereafter. Reviewing Oodles, Mark Bittman of The New York Times wrote that "[d]espite the angular, not-especially-attractive interior, the restaurant is comfortable and inviting, and the brazen nature of the food gives a meal here a true sense of excitement."

Gilmore was recognized as a champion of women chefs. She was also credited for her mentorship of fellow lesbian cooks. In 1993, she co-founded the organization Women Chefs & Restaurateurs, along with fellow San Francisco chefs Barbara Tropp and Joyce Goldstein.

She died on July 6, 2019, in San Francisco, of cardiac arrest due to a series of ongoing medical issues.
