= Priester =

Priester (German for "priest") may refer to:

== People ==
- Alice Michaelis (née Alice Priester; 1875–1943), German painter, teacher
- Aquiles Priester (born 1971), Brazilian metal drummer
- Eva Priester (1910–1982), Austrian journalist and socialist activist
- Julian Priester (born 1935), American jazz trombone player and composer
- Karl-Heinz Priester (1913–1961), German far right political activist
- Lee Priester (1903–1988), American track and field athlete, and Olympian
- Mitchell Burgzorg (born 1987), Dutch footballer who uses Priester as his stage name for his rap music career
- Quinn Priester (born 2000), American baseball player

== Other ==
- Priester Building

== See also ==
- Priest
- Priesterweg railway station
- Priesterbäker See, lake in Müritz National Park, Mecklenburg-Vorpommern, Germany
