= Waikiki Natatorium War Memorial =

- War Memorial Natatorium
- U.S. National Register of Historic Places
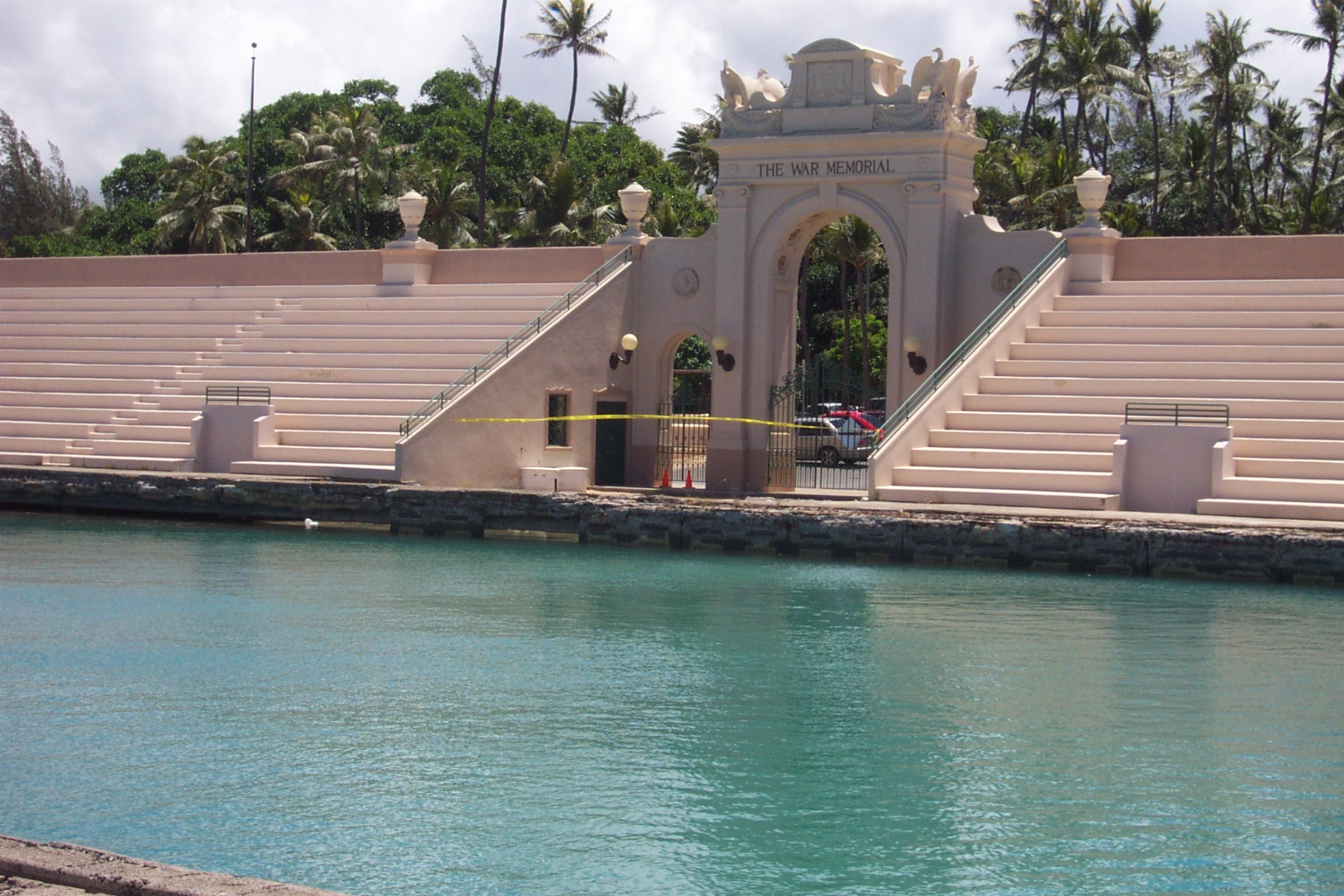
- The inside of the Natatorium, looking at the bleachers

- Location within Honolulu Location within Oahu Location within Hawaii
- Location: Kalakaua Avenue, Honolulu, Hawaii
- Coordinates: 21°15′52″N 157°49′19″W
- Area: 5.3 acres (2.1 ha)
- Built: 1927
- Architect: Lewis P. Hobart
- Architectural style: Beaux Arts
- NRHP reference No.: 80001283
- Added to NRHP: August 11, 1980

The Waikiki Natatorium War Memorial is a war memorial in Honolulu, Hawaii, USA, built in the form of an ocean water public swimming pool. The Natatorium was built as a living memorial dedicated to "the men and women who served during the great war" (now known as World War I).

== Creation of the memorial ==
In March 1918, the Daughters and Sons of Hawaiian Warriors first proposed a memorial to the more than 10,000 men from the then Territory of Hawaii who volunteered to serve in the great war. The Honolulu Ad Club agreed with the idea and on November 20, 1918, appointed an investigative committee led by Colonel Howard Hathaway, Ned Loomis, and W.D. Westervelt to bring together representatives from all civic organizations to collaborate on the concept of a memorial beginning with a conference which was held on December 6, 1918. At this meeting, Colonel Hathway was appointed Chairman and Fred W. Beckley was appointed Secretary of the general committee on a war memorial.

At the second meeting, a subcommittee was formed to investigate and prepare a report on the design and cost estimates of a war memorial. This subcommittee included:

- Princess Kalanianaole
- Mrs. Walter Macfarlane
- Mrs. A. A. Young
- Mrs. Wilhelmine Kekelaokalaninui Widemann Dowsett
- C.R. Hemenway
- Senator John H. Wise
- J.D. McInerny

Upon the report of the subcommittee, a plan to acquire the former William G. Irwin Estate (between the shoreline and Kapiolani Park in Waikiki) for a public park for the memorial gained unanimous support. To pursue the idea, John Guild, Mrs. Walter Macfarlane, Mrs. John Baird, Mrs. A. G. M. Robertson, and Alexander Rume Ford took the lead in pursuing the property.

A bill passed the territorial legislature with "practical unanimity". The governor signed it on April 29, 1919, providing for the acquisition of the Irwin property through the sale of territorial bonds and provided that the property should be named "Memorial Park".

Memorial Park was formally dedicated on the first anniversary of the signing of the armistice with the dedication organized by the recently formed organization the American Legion.

In 1920, with the memorial's site now acquired, a committee to study and recommend designs for the memorial itself was organized. The Honolulu Historical Commission, Territory of Hawaii, lists the members of the memorial committee as:

- J. K. Butler
- L. S. Cain
- A. L. C. Atkinson
- A. T. Longley
- H. P. O'Sullivan
- Norman Watkins
- Lawrence M. Judd
- J. R. Galt
- L. B. Reeves
- Alexander May
- R. L. Richards
- G. H. Angus
- Sherwood Lowrey
- R. N. Burnham for the Rotary Club
- Milo Vanek for the Ad Club
- Gordon Usborne for the Hawaiian Academy of Art and Design.

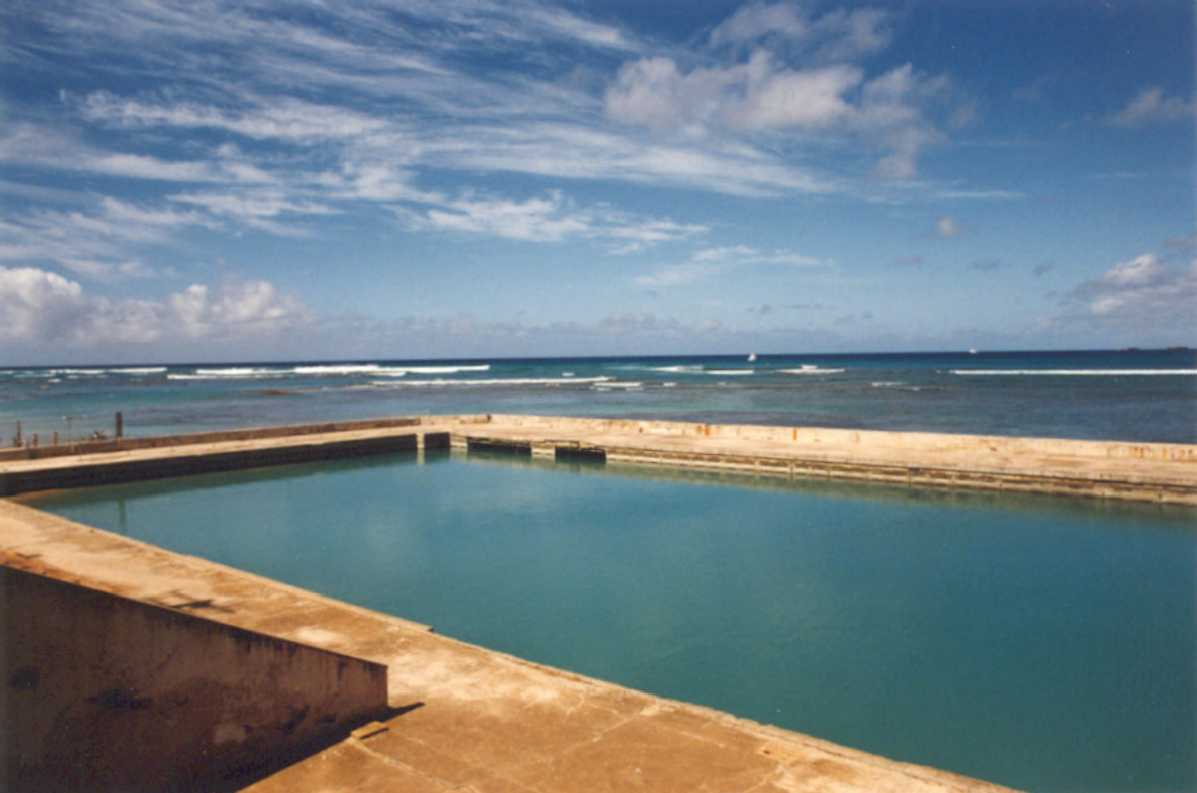
Saltwater swimming pool in the interior of the Natatorium

After much deliberation, the committee reported its final recommendation for the war memorial. According to the Historical Commission of the Territory of Hawaii, "the scheme evolved called for a memorial natatorium with a pavilion and attractive landscaping of Memorial Park, the swimming pool itself to be of Olympic proportions".

On the opening day of the 1921 Territorial Legislature, Senator Lawrence Judd introduced a bill for the construction of a war memorial at Memorial Park, to be funded by issuing territorial bonds. The bill specified that the memorial be dedicated to "the men and women of Hawaii who served during the great war", an expansion of the initial concept to honor the men of Hawaii who died in service during World War I.

The bill passed both houses of the legislature and was signed by the governor on March 15, 1921, becoming Act 15. It set three requirements for the design of the memorial:

1. It is to be in Memorial Park, Waikiki
2. It "shall contain a swimming course of at least 100 meters"; and
3. All other design elements were to be determined by a design contest with features chosen by a Territorial War Commission appointed by the governor.

== Territorial War Memorial Commission ==
Act 15 provided for the formation of a Territorial War Memorial Commission to determine the features of the memorial beyond the requirements set out by law: the swimming course of 100 meters and the location. Governor Charles J. McCarthy appointed the members of the commission: A. Lester Marks, Chairman
John R. Galt, Secretary
A. L. C. Atkinson, later replaced by J. K. Butler

Louis Christian Mullgardt, a Fellow of the American Institute of Architects (AIA), was appointed as an advisory architect to prepare a general scheme for the park and to plan and execute a competition following the rules set forth by the AIA.

The jury to determine the winning design was composed of:
The Governor of the Territory of Hawaii
The Mayor of Honolulu
Architect Bernard R. Maybeck of San Francisco
Architect Ellis F. Lawrence of Portland
Architect Walter R. B. Willcox of Seattle

The jury selected the design by San Francisco architect Lewis P. Hobart as the first prize, writing:

It reveals a fine, discriminating taste and ability in architectural design, and in such landscape treatment as reflects the highly individual color and flavor of Hawaii and Honolulu; it forecasts a memorial which will sustain an appropriate interest into the distant future, and perpetuate the noble thought and purpose which animated the original conception of the project.

== Current state ==
Located in Honolulu, at the shore west of Kapiolani Park and completed in 1927, the natatorium was built in the Hawaiian Beaux-Arts architectural style. The entrance to the memorial includes an arch featuring four stone eagles typical of this style.

Inside the memorial is a 100-meter by 40-meter saltwater swimming pool. In the opening ceremonies on August 24, 1927, the local Olympic gold medal holder Duke Kahanamoku made the first swim (it was his birthday). In the following swim meet, world record holder Johnny Weissmuller won the 100-, 400- and 800-meter events, and Buster Crabbe (also local) won the 1500 meters.

After the attack on Pearl Harbor in 1941, the natatorium was taken over by the US Army and used for training during World War II. It was then refurbished and turned over to the City and County of Honolulu on July 1, 1949. Its condition deteriorated, and it officially closed in 1963, but continued to be used.

It was added to the National Register of Historic Places listings in Oahu on August 11, 1980, as site 80001283.

There have been several proposals to demolish the structure, while others argue for its preservation and repair. For generations, the natatorium was a popular recreational gathering center for residents and tourists. It closed to the public in 1979 due to safety concerns, and the city council has at various times supported its renovation and its demolition.

=== 2018–2019 renovation and reopening draft study ===
In 2018–2019, the City and County of Honolulu began a study of reopening the memorial. The draft study is available online and allows the city to proceed with research on alternatives that will allow the memorial to be brought into usable condition and resolve hazards that prevent it from being a proud representation and tribute to veterans.

The EIS study notes the "significant and adverse" socio-cultural impact if no action is taken to improve the dilapidated structure. The mayor estimates the preferred renovation option will cost around $25.6 million.

== Kaimana Beach ==
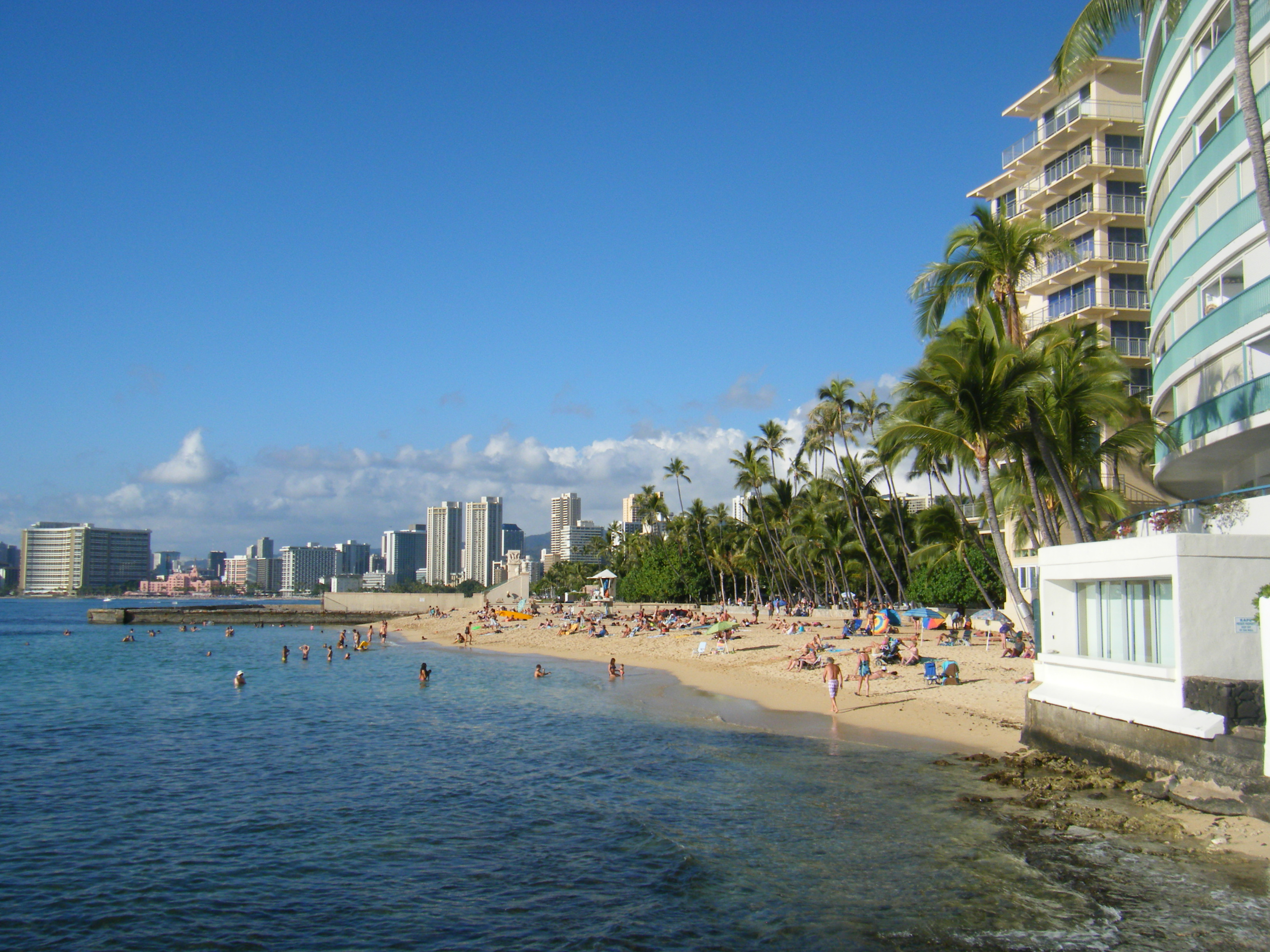
Kaimana Beach with the Natatorium and Waikiki in the background

Adjacent to the natatorium is Kaimana Beach, a popular destination for residents of Kaimuki, Manoa, Diamond Head, and other surrounding communities. Kaimana is a sandy beach lined with palms with a lifeguard tower, showers, and public parking.

Kaimana Beach was originally a rocky beach with a narrow strip of sand. It is also known as Sans Souci (French for "without worries") Beach for the hotel once run by George Lycurgus in 1893, named in turn after the Sanssouci Palace in Potsdam.

After the natatorium was built, Kaimana accumulated a vastly wider sandy beach. "Kaimana" is not an ancient Hawaiian name for the area, but rather the Hawaiian pronunciation of the English name for the nearby Diamond Head. The former Sans Souci site is now the New Otani Kaimana Beach Hotel.

Kaimana Beach was the endpoint of the first submarine communications cable between California and Hawaii. Duke Kahanamoku's uncle David Piikoi was said to have dragged the underwater cable through Kapua Channel and onto Kaimana's shore in 1902. The first telegraphic message over this new cable was sent on January 1, 1903, from Henry Ernest Cooper to President Theodore Roosevelt in Washington, DC.

== Popular Culture ==
The Waikiki Natatorium War Memorial was featured in the third episode (Thank Heaven for Little Girls and Big Ones, Too) of the television show Magnum, P.I. that aired on December 25, 1980. In the episode Magnum, played by Tom Selleck, is seen parking outside the site, walking around inside the natatorium, and hiding a rare and valuable painting at the top of the seating section.

== Gallery ==
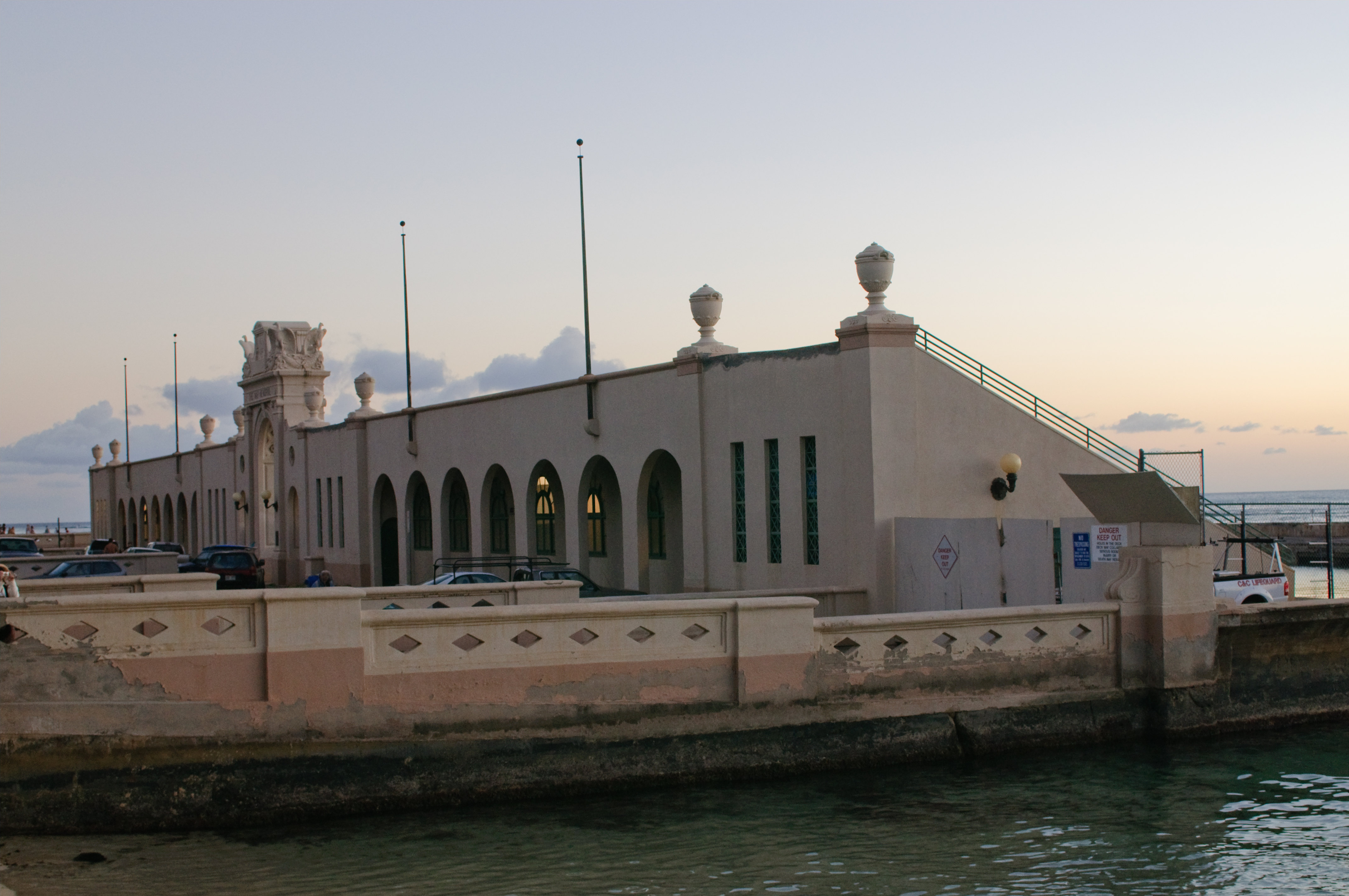
Waikiki Natatorium in 2010

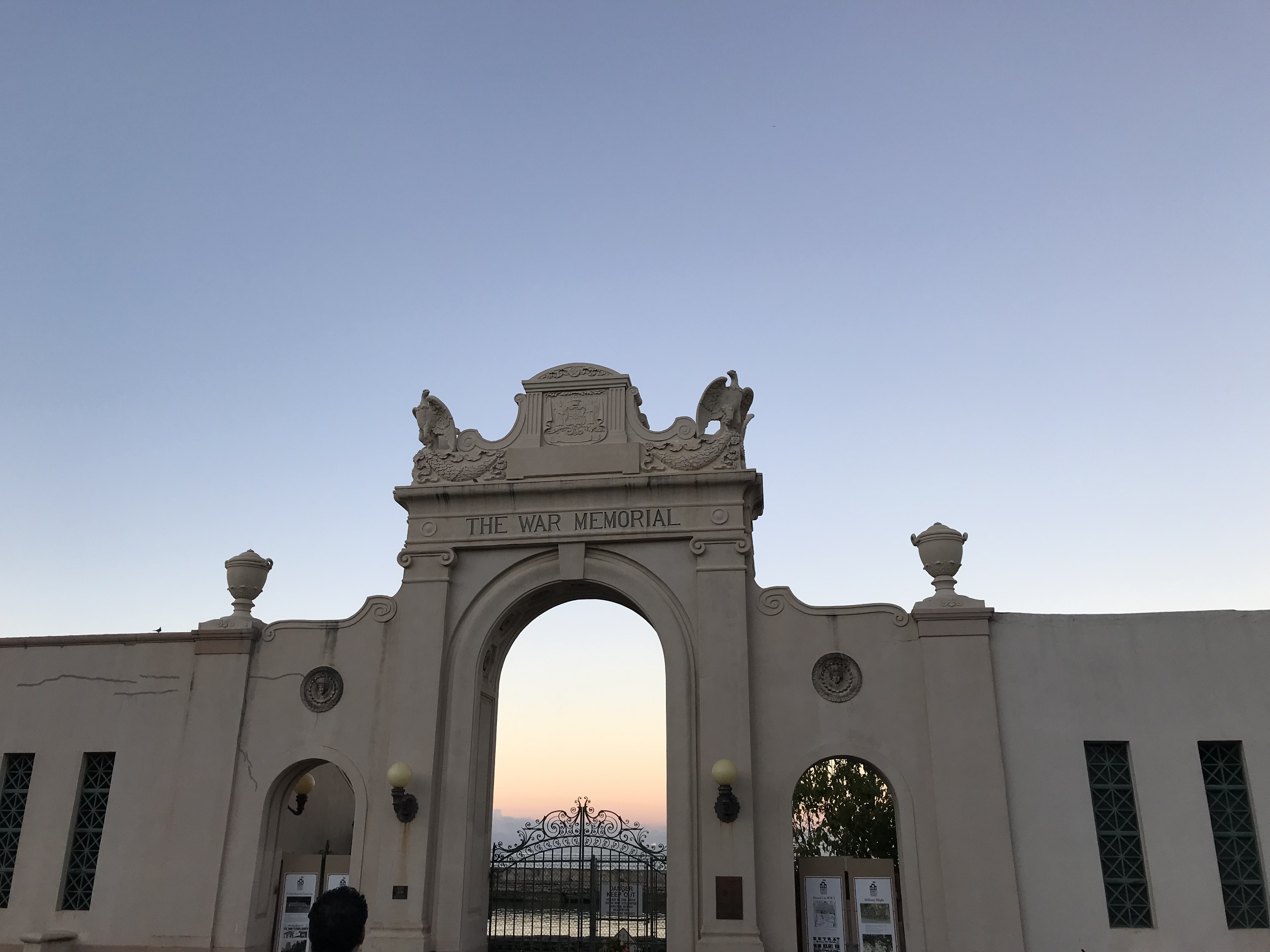
Sunrise at the Waikiki Natatorium in 2021
