= Roger Lee (architect) =

American architect (1920–1981)

- Born: Roger Lun Yuen Lee; February 19, 1920; San Francisco, California, U.S.
- Died: June 23, 1981 (aged 61); Honolulu, Hawaii, U.S.
- Education: University of California, Berkeley (BA)
- Occupation: Architect
- Known for: Modernist architecture in California and Hawaii
- Movement: Second Bay Tradition; Modernist architecture
- Spouse: Rena Leong
- Children: 3
- Awards: Award of Merit, American Institute of Architects (AIA), 1955 "America's Best Small Houses", 1949 First Honor award in the AIA "Homes for Better Living Program", 1956

Roger Lun Yuen Lee, FAIA (February 19, 1920 – June 23, 1981) was an American modernist architect of Chinese descent, who designed more than 100 houses and other projects in Northern California, Nevada, and Hawaii. Most of his work was done during the 1950s and 1960s, and mainly in the San Francisco Bay Area. He has been referred to as an architect who "designed high style for the middle class", and is today considered one of "the forgotten mid-century modernist" architects. Lee was also one of the few Chinese American architects in the nation when he first received his license in 1947.He was regarded as one of the most brainy architect of his times because of his unconventional modernist way of designs.

Lee's residential designs were noted for their grace and clarity, often designed in a modern style with extensive use of walls of glass and redwood panels. In 1957 the London Architectural Review recognized him as one of forty U.S. architects who have "made personal contributions to American Architecture". Along with residences, he designed apartments, housing projects, recreational facilities, and churches. In 1964 he moved his practice to Hawaii.

He grew up with the ideals of European modernism, writes architecture author Dave Weinstein, "that architecture should be functional, unadorned and elegant and make a difference in the lives of everyday people".

== Early life and education ==
Roger Lun Yuen Lee was born on February 19, 1920, in San Francisco, California. His mother was May Choy Chan born Napa, and his father was Yum Lee, born in China.

He received his bachelor's degree in 1941, in arts and architecture from the University of California, Berkeley, with top design honors. As a student, he was a member of the Delta Sigma Chi, the Honorary Architecture Fraternity.

== Career ==
During 1941 and 1945, while the U.S. was engaged in World War II, he worked on designing U.S. Post Offices, and served as an assistant engineer with the U.S. Army Corps of Engineers office in Honolulu, working on various defense projects. Following the war he practiced for a year with a number of firms in the Los Angeles area, and returned to the San Francisco Bay Area in 1947 where he was associated as a draftsman for architect Fred Langhorst (Frederick Lothian Langhorst).

Lee was noted for the "grace and clarity" of his residential designs which made him one of the foremost proponents of the Bay Region Style after World War II. He received a number of awards and honors including "America's Best Small Houses, 1949" for his own Berkeley residence; an Award of Merit in the American Institute of Architects (AIA) Honor Awards Program, 1955 for the George Channing residence in Sausalito; and First Honor award in the AIA "Homes for Better Living Program, 1956" for the William Wilkinson House in Orinda. Irene Wilkinson stated that she loves her house because "it is unpretentious and harmonizes with nature."

In 1957, the London Architectural Review recognized him as one of forty U.S. architects who have "made personal contributions to American Architecture". During the course of his California practice he designed nearly 100 residences, and a small number of apartments, housing projects, recreational facilities, and churches. In 1955 he designed a series of "Universal Homes" in Kensington CA.

According to Weinstein, he helped introduce a "new way of living" using modernist designs. In 1949, Architectural Forum devoted three pages to a cluster of six El Cerrito homes designed by Lee with the headline "Modern design: Out West the customer is starting to demand it." Lee influenced other architects, including Case Study House (#26) architect Beverly (David) Thorne, and Paffard Keatinge-Clay, both of whom had interned under Lee.

In 1963, Lee became the president of the AIA East Bay chapter, and was also named a Fellow of the American Institute of Architects the same year.

== Design styles ==
Lee helped develop the "Second Bay Area Tradition" of mid-century modernism, incorporating open plans, glass walls, and attention to nature. His houses are considered easy to identify, generally having a flat roof, inconspicuous front door and glass walls. The homes are usually long and low, have no decoration other than "lovely rhythms created by structural elements, ceiling beams and decking, and a strong Asian influence", notes landscape architect Ted Osmundson. He used post-and-beam construction — exposed beams supported by widely and regularly spaced posts. The technique, which is common to modern homes, allows for larger spaces and larger expanses of glass than are possible with traditional wood-frame construction. It also provides a visual element: "Literally you can see the structure from anywhere in the house," notes a former client of Lee.

Weinstein notes that after the war, young architects were "energized" as popular home magazines published numerous articles about the new techniques being used in construction, such as plastics and aluminum, which could be used to manufacture affordable homes for the new middle class. "It was to be a new age with a new way of living, and modernism, with its clean lines, would make it work . . " As a result, Lee is considered one of "the Bay Area's great forgotten architects", notes Waverly Lowell, curator of UC Berkeley's Environmental Design Archives.

Lee's designs resembled the modern homes of Joseph Eichler, with post-and-beam construction, concrete slab foundations, radiant floor heating, and an "open" plan. Within a year after he opened his own firm in 1949 through the 1960s, Lee's homes were often written up in major architectural magazines. His name was often mentioned alongside other leading modern architects of the time, including Richard Neutra, and William Wurster, both of whom also worked in Northern California. Within a few years his designs were also described in popular home magazines including House and Garden, Sunset, and others.

Lee also designed a unique home style which became known as the "Moduflex" house, based on standardized parts to keep costs down. During the mid-1960s his homes could be built for as little as $25,000, or about $20 a square foot.

== Later years and personal life ==
In 1969, he moved his practice to Hawaii and continue to design modern homes. He won the Hawaii AIA Design Award for St. Stephens Catholic Church (1968) in Nuuanu.

Lee was a family man and was married to Rena Leong, having met his wife in Hawaii during World War II. They had two sons and a daughter. He enjoyed sports cars and summer vacations with his family to Yosemite or Oregon, and loved to fish when he had time.

Lee died at age 61 of cancer on June 23, 1981, in Honolulu.

== List of work ==
- Roger Lee House (1948), 2145 McGee Street, Berkeley, California
- Dr. E. E. Fong Medical Building (1951), University Avenue, Berkeley, California
- George Channing House (1952), Sausalito, California
- George Channing House (1954), Berkeley, California
- Elizabeth Perry House (1954), Berkeley, California
- William Wilkinson House (1956), Orinda, California
- Beverly Cleary House (1956),1091 Creston Road, Berkeley, California
- Dr. Albert Newton House (c. 1957), Yreka, California
- Berkeley Chinese Community Church (c. 1958), 2117 Acton Street, Berkeley, California
- 2305 Virginia Street (c. 1958), Berkeley, California
- Jean Gray Hargrove House (1958), 100 Parnassus Road, Berkeley, California
- Haste Park Apartments (1961), Berkeley, California
- Terrace West Apartments (1963–1964), 1725 Shattuck Avenue, Berkeley, California
- Terrace East Apartments (1963–1964), 1750 Walnut Street, Berkeley, California
- St. Stephens Catholic Church (1968), Pali Highway, Nuuanu, O'ahu, Hawaii
- 2357 Aina Lani Place (1972), Honolulu, Hawaii
- 1710 Nalulu Place (1972), Honolulu, Hawaii
- The Anga Roa (1973), 1545 Nehoa Street, Honolulu, Hawaii
- Dr. Walter Chang Residence (c. 1974), Round Top Drive, Honolulu, Hawaii

== Publications ==
=== Books ===
- Hennessey, William J., ed. (1949). America's Best Small Houses. New York City, NY: The Viking Press. A survey book of architects and design, included in this book are Roger Lee, Ernst A. Benkert, Berla & Abel, Harold J. Bissner, Jerome Robert Cerny, Fritz Craig, Gardner A. Daily, John N. Douglas, Gordon Drake, Philmer J. Ellerbroek, Boyd Georgi, Samuel Glaser, Raymond Viner Hall, Chalfant Head, Alber H. Hill, E. H. and M. K. Hunter, George F. and William Keck, Paul Kirk, Carl Koch, Herman H. Lackner, Joseph Marlow, F. J. McCarthy, Allen L. McGill, Mitchell & Ritchey, Claus R. Moberg, Philip Moore, Thomas J. Nolan and Sons, Gryffyf Partridge, George R. Paul, Ramey, Hines & Buchner, John R. Sproule, Hugh Stubbins Jr., Arthur C. Swab, Kenneth R. Swift, Paul Thiry, Royal Barry Wills, Wurster, Bernardi & Emmons, and Harold B. Zook.

=== Articles ===
- Lee, Roger (October 26, 1969). "Environmental Design: An Asset To The Client". Honolulu Star-Bulletin. p. 73.
- Lee, Roger (December 14, 1969). "A Major Influence: Environment in Design An Architect's Concern". Honolulu Star-Advertiser. p. 53.
