= Priester Building =

- The Priester Building
- U.S. National Register of Historic Places
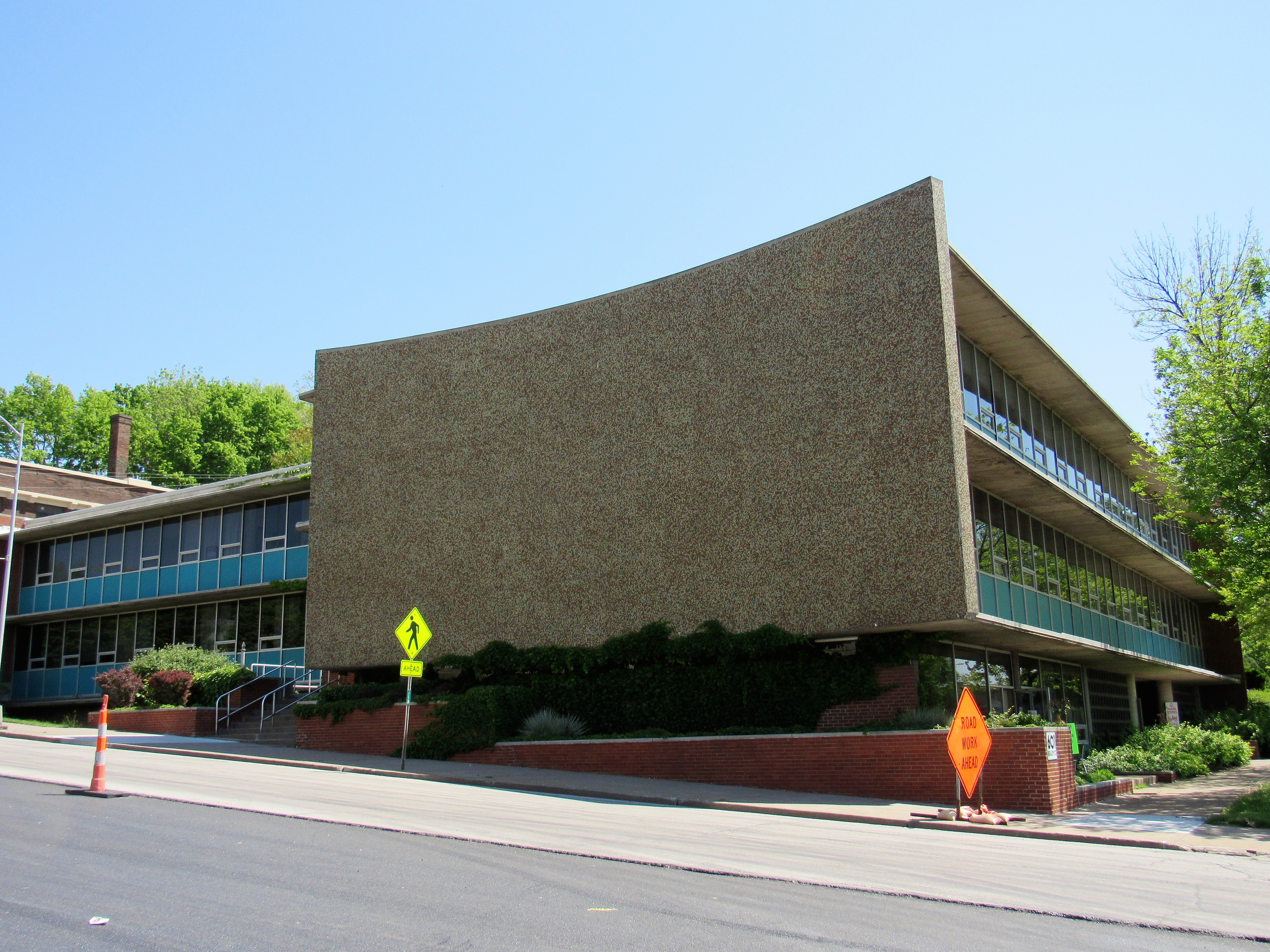
- The Priester Building in 2017

- Location within Iowa Location within the United States
- Location: 601 Brady St. Davenport, Iowa
- Coordinates: 41°31′33.4″N 90°34′25.6″W
- Area: less than one acre
- Built: 1958
- Built by: Priester Construction
- Architect: John ("Jack") W. Kruse; Parish and Richardson
- Architectural style: International Style
- NRHP reference No.: 100000493
- Added to NRHP: January 17, 2017

The Priester Building is a historic building located just north of Downtown Davenport, Iowa, United States. The low-rise office building was built for the headquarters of Priester Construction Company, and its real estate division, in 1958. The well-preserved structure is significant as an excellent example of the late International Style. It was designed by San Francisco architect John ("Jack") W. Kruse, formerly of Davenport, and the local architectural firm of Parish and Richardson. That firm has its roots in the architectural practice of prominent Davenport architect Frederick G. Clausen. It is believed that this was the first modernistic commercial design in Davenport, and it brought West Coast cutting-edge architecture to the Midwest. It is also noteworthy for its location in the side of a hill and the difficulties that presented for construction, and the first-ever use of a plastic shell for winter-time construction in the city. The T-shaped building rises three-stories to the height of 39.29 feet (11.98 m). It features perimeter landscaping, a curved mosaic wall on the west elevation to deflect traffic noise from Brady Street, views to the south and west that reflected weather and sun conditions on design and operating conditions, and it is fully air conditioned.

The building was listed on the National Register of Historic Places in 2017. A plan has been developed by Newbury Living of West Des Moines, Iowa to convert the building from office space into a 33-unit apartment building.
