= John Kruse (architect) =

American mid-century architect

- John Walter Kruse
- Born: March 11, 1918; Davenport, Iowa, US
- Died: November 8, 2000 (aged 82); California, US
- Occupation: Architect
- Spouses: Elizabeth Cattori (m. 1946) Miriam Sours (m. 1985)
- Children: 4
- Practice: Hill & Kruse Architects
- Website
- Military career
- Allegiance: United States of America
- Branch: United States Navy
- Service years: 1941-1945
- Rank: Lieutenant

John Kruse (1918-2000) was an American architect born in Davenport, Iowa. Kruse attended Cornell and MIT, and served in World War II in the U.S. Navy as a lieutenant. After returning from war, Kruse joined the office of renowned modernist architects John Elkin Dinwiddie and Erich Mendelsohn to start his career. He left the firm in 1948 with his colleague Henry Hill to join Hill's personal practice as the structural expert. Kruse made partner in 1965 to form Hill & Kruse Architects. This prolific partnership designed more than 500 residences and commercial buildings in the California, Hawaii, Connecticut, Illinois, Kentucky, Quebec, and El Salvador. Their design helped define Second Bay Tradition, which combined International Style with Northern California's regional vernacular and wood materials.

Kruse moved to Carmel after his retirement, living in one of the three houses, nicknamed "Three Sisters", designed by his partner Henry Hill on the same block, along with one of their former associates. His house on Lopez Avenue is a Mid-century modern residence constructed in 1961, featuring wood walls and a steeply pitched roof. The house was added to Carmel’s list of historic buildings in 2004. In 2024, the property obtained a Mills Act contract, which gives a reduction in property taxes in return for the ongoing preservation of the house.

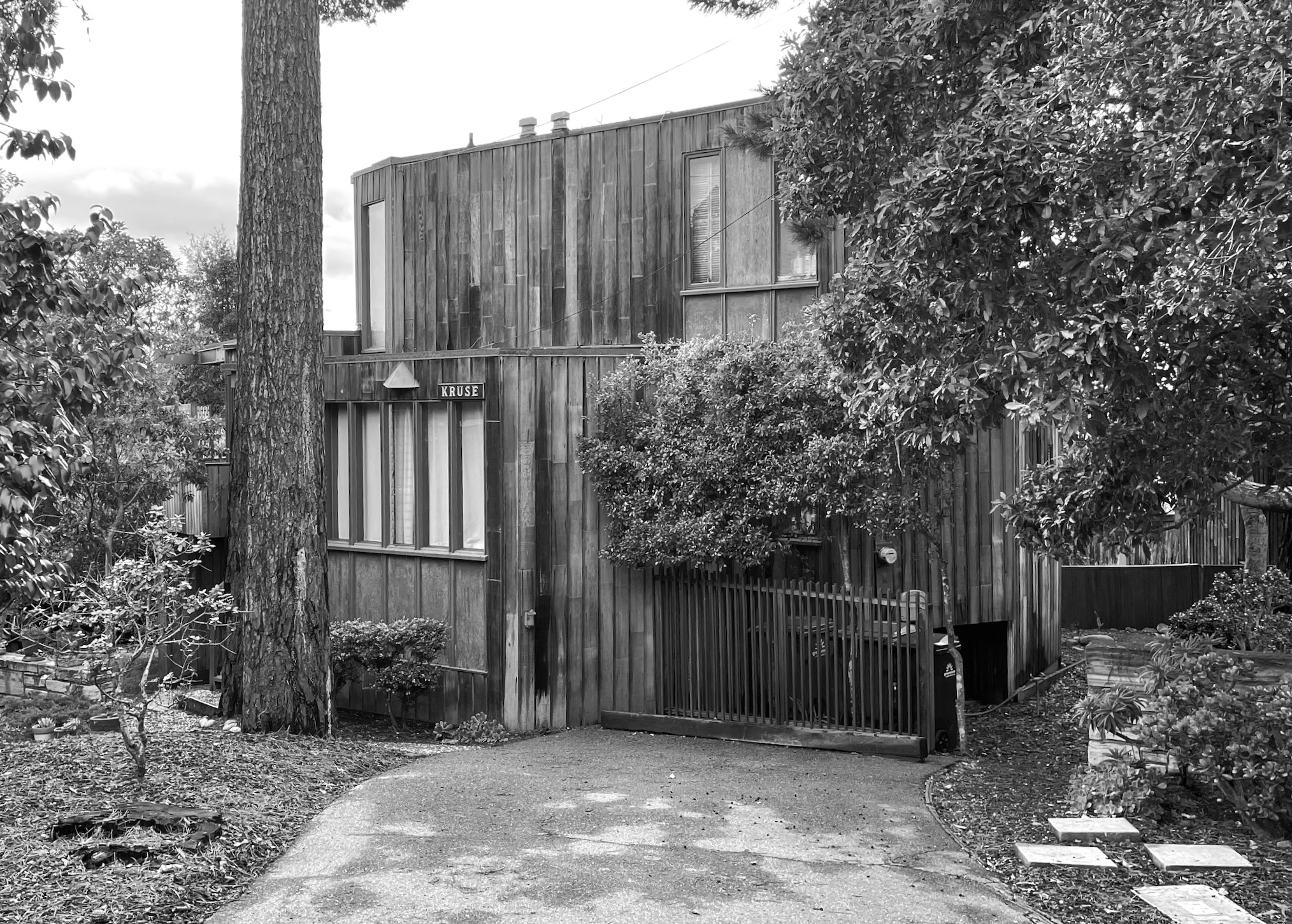
Kruse residence in Carmel California

Kruse's archive was donated by his family upon his death to the Environmental Design Archives at UC Berkeley.
