= First Bay Tradition =

Architectural style

First Bay Tradition (also known as First Bay Area Tradition or San Francisco Bay Region Tradition) was an architectural style from the period of the 1880s to early 1920s. Sometimes considered as a regional interpretation of the Eastern Shingle Style, it came as a reaction to the classicism of Beaux-Arts architecture. Its characteristics included a link to nature and use of locally sourced materials such as redwood. It also incorporated an emphasis on craftsmanship, volume, form, and asymmetry. The tradition was rooted in San Francisco and the greater Bay Area. The Environmental Design Archives at the University of California, Berkeley house a repository of drawings and specifications associated with this tradition.

Joseph Worcester – a minister, mystic, and amateur architect, is believed to have developed the First Bay Tradition in its early stages. The style was later popularized by the architects Bernard Maybeck and Willis Polk. Other architects associated with the tradition included A. Page Brown, Ernest Coxhead, John Galen Howard, Julia Morgan, Louis Christian Mullgardt, and A. C. Schweinfurth. Polk, Maybeck, and Schweinfurth had previously worked in Brown's office.

The tradition influenced later styles such as the Modernists of the follow-on Second Bay Tradition. Transitional architects associated with the bridge between these two traditions were Henry Higby Gutterson and John Hudson Thomas.

== See also ==
- Second Bay Tradition
- Third Bay Tradition
