= Lewis P. Hobart =

American architect

Lewis Parsons Hobart
- Born: January 14, 1873; St. Louis, Missouri, US
- Died: October 19, 1954 (aged 81); San Francisco, California, US
- Burial place: Cypress Lawn Memorial Park
- Education: University of California, Berkeley, Beaux-Arts de Paris, American Academy in Rome
- Occupation: Architect

Lewis Parsons Hobart (January 14, 1873 – October 19, 1954) was an American architect whose designs included San Francisco's Grace Cathedral and Macy's Union Square, several California Academy of Sciences buildings, and the 511 Federal Building in Portland, Oregon.

== Biography ==
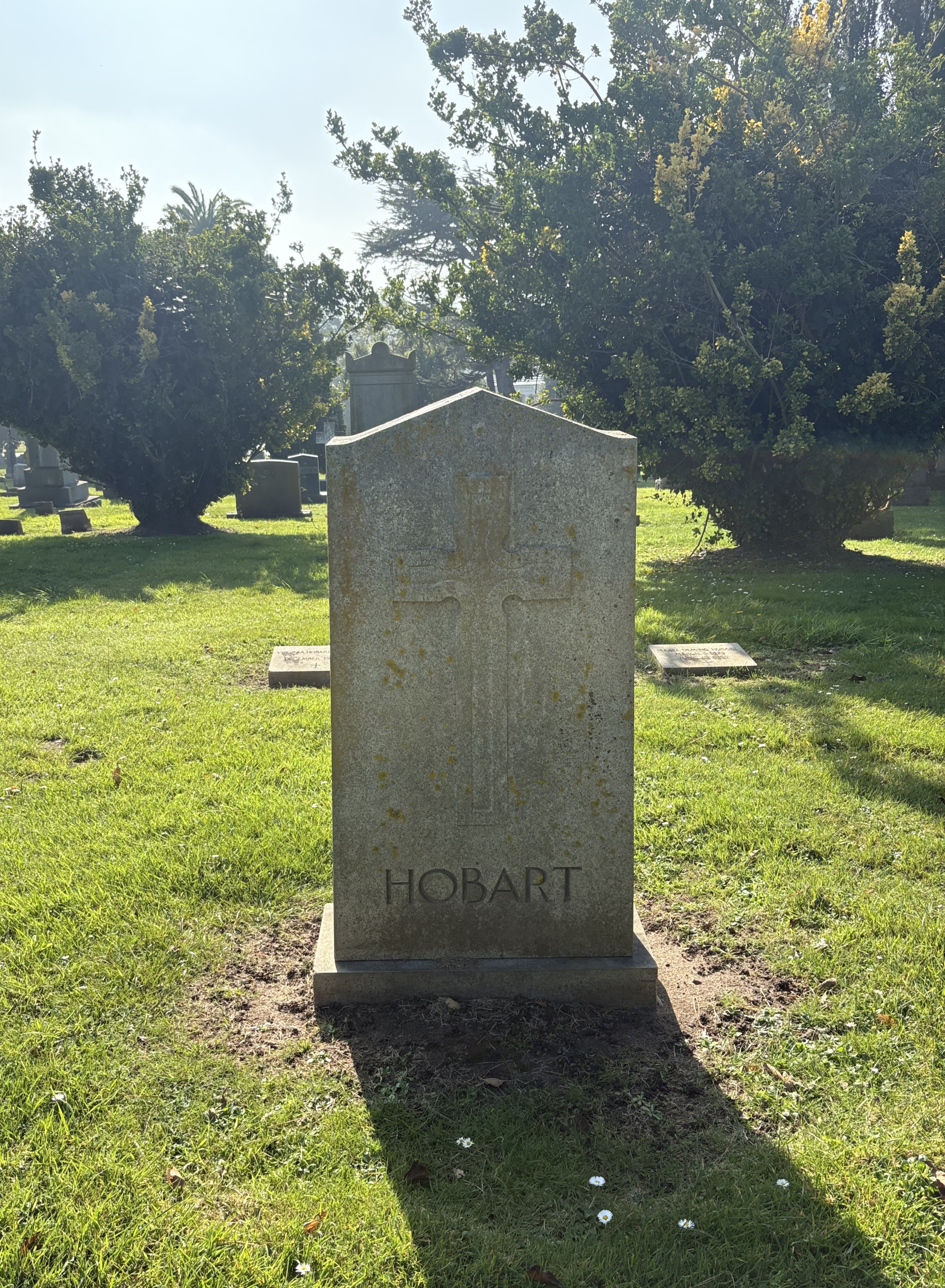
Hobart's grave at Cypress Lawn Memorial Park

Hobart was born in St. Louis, Missouri. He received bachelor's and master's degrees from the University of California, Berkeley, and studied at the American Academy in Rome and the École nationale supérieure des Beaux-Arts in Paris.

Hobart played a role in the rebuilding efforts of the San Francisco Bay Area following the 1906 San Francisco earthquake, designing several buildings. A number of his works are listed on the U.S. National Register of Historic Places.

The Lodge at Pebble Beach, dates to 1908 when Hobart of was hired by the Pacific Improvement Company (PIC) to design the Pebble Beach Lodge. The rustic Log cabin style inn was built of huge timbers cut from the nearby forests. Pebble Beach and the one-story lodge were announced in The San Francisco Call on May 28, 1909, with new roads that access the inn and surrounding 17-Mile Drive.

Hobart became the first President of the San Francisco Arts Commission in 1932 and was also appointed to the Board of Architects for the 1939 Golden Gate International Exposition.

He died at his home in San Francisco on October 19, 1954, and was buried at Cypress Lawn Memorial Park in Colma.

== Works ==
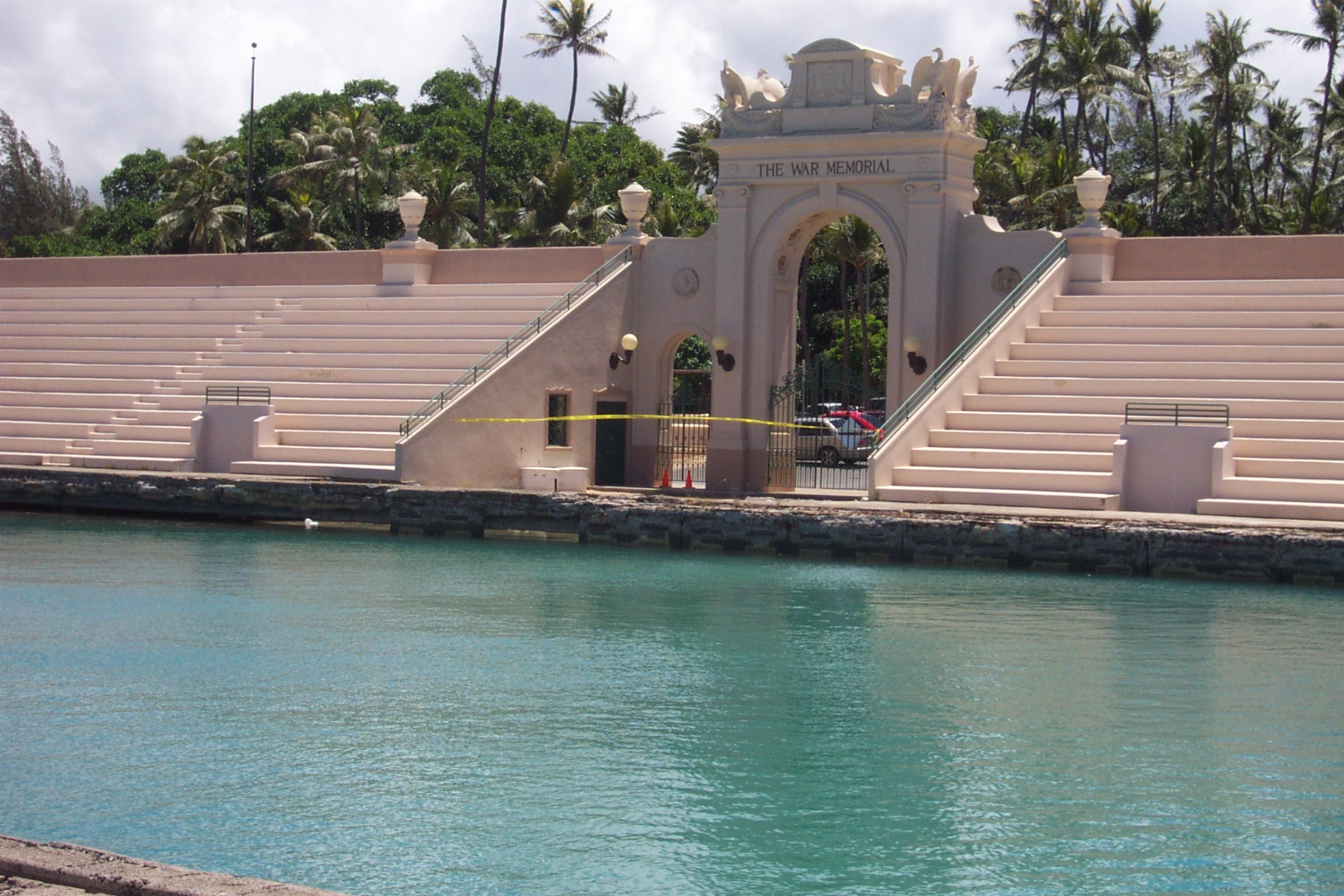
War Memorial Natatorium, Waikiki, Hawai'i

- Macy's Union Square, Stockton Street at O'Farrell, San Francisco, California; opened 1929 as O'Connor and Mofatt, expanded 1947
- Newhall Estate, 1761 Manor Drive, Hillsborough, California (Hobart, Lewis Parsons); NRHP-listed
- One or more works in Russian Hill-Paris Block Architectural District, roughly 1017-1067 Green Street, San Francisco, California (Hobart, L.P.); NRHP-listed
- U.S. Post Office (Portland, Oregon), 511 NW Broadway, Portland, Oregon (Hobart, Lewis P.); NRHP-listed
- War Memorial Natatorium, Kalakaua Avenue, Honolulu, Hawai'i (Hobart, Lewis P.); NRHP-listed
