= 511 Federal Building =

Historic building in Portland, Oregon, U.S.

- U.S. Post Office (Portland, Oregon)
- U.S. National Register of Historic Places
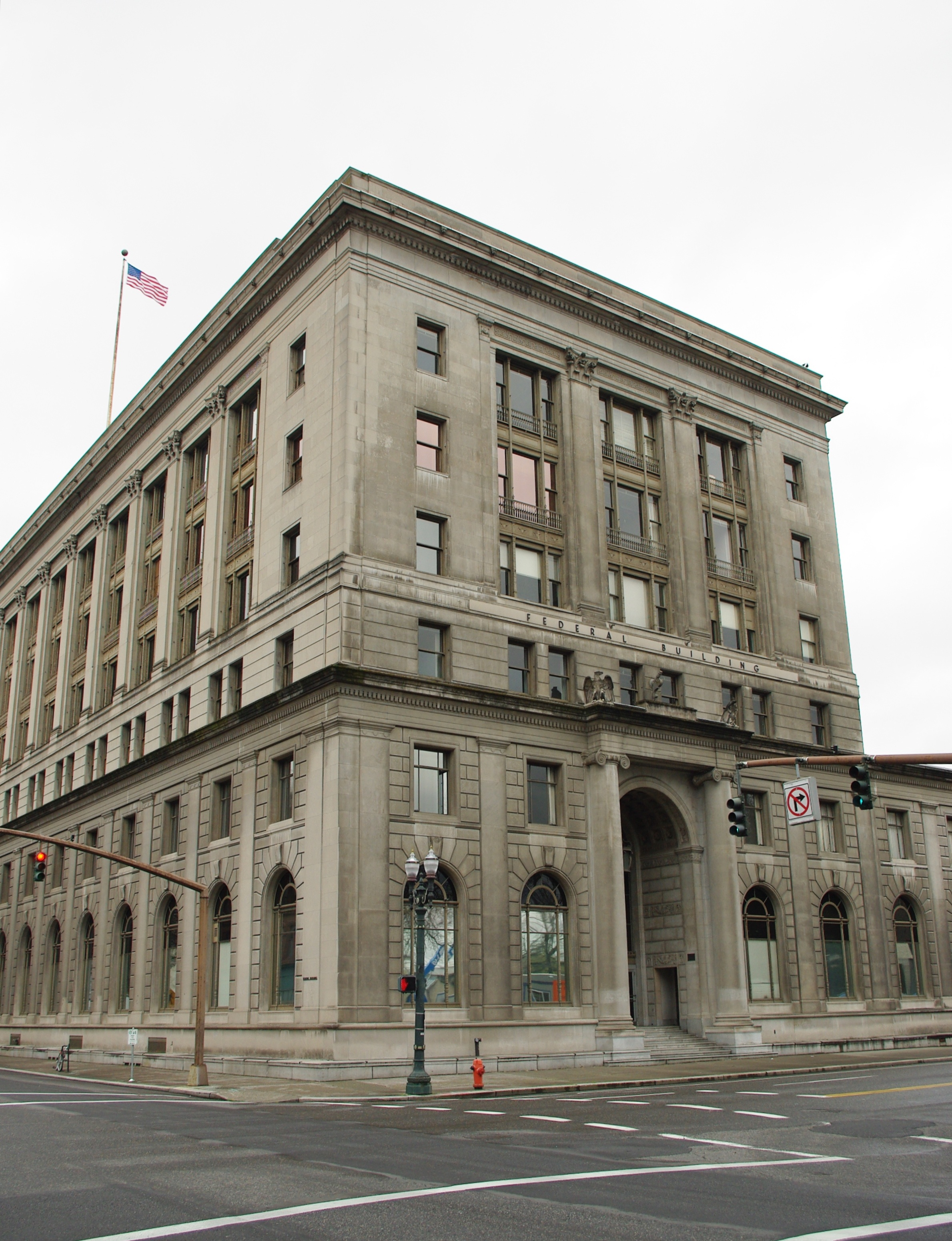
- Seen from the southeast in 2011

- Location within Portland, Oregon Location within Oregon Location within the United States
- Location: 511 NW Broadway; Portland, Oregon
- Coordinates: 45°31′37″N 122°40′41″W
- Built: 1916–1918
- Architect: Lewis P. Hobart
- Architectural style: Classical Revival
- NRHP reference No.: 79002143
- Added to NRHP: April 18, 1979

The 511 Federal Building is a former federal post office that is currently known as the Arlene and Harold Schnitzer Center for Art and Design of the Pacific Northwest College of Art (PNCA) in Portland, Oregon, United States. PNCA moved into the building in February 2015, after a $32 million remodeling project.

Previous occupants of the building included the Department of Homeland Security offices for U.S. Citizenship and Immigration Services and U.S. Immigration and Customs Enforcement, as well as the Department of Agriculture.

The building was constructed in 1916–1918 and opened in 1919 after being commissioned by the Secretary of the Treasury, one of the last post offices built under the 1893 Tarsney Act, and cost $1 million. It was designed by architect Lewis P. Hobart. It is located between Portland's Old Town Chinatown and the Pearl District. It was added to the National Register of Historic Places in 1979, as the U.S. Post Office. The building is six stories tall and has a footprint of approximately 20,000 square feet (1,900 m^{2}). It has a basement and sub-basement, complete with walled off shanghai tunnels.

== Gallery ==
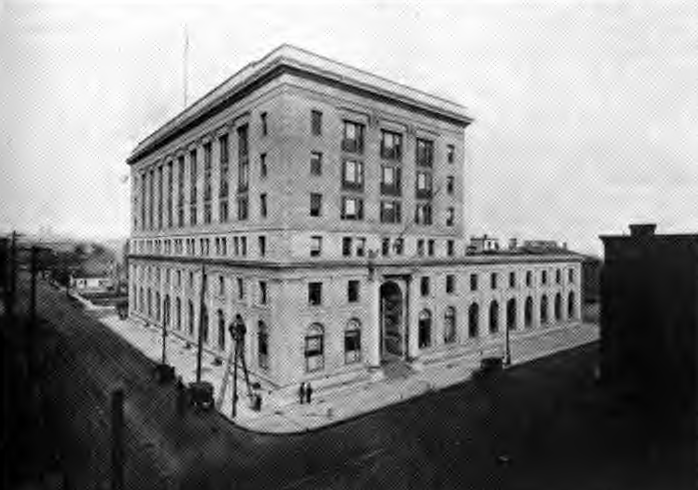
Circa 1920 picture of the building, viewed from the southeast

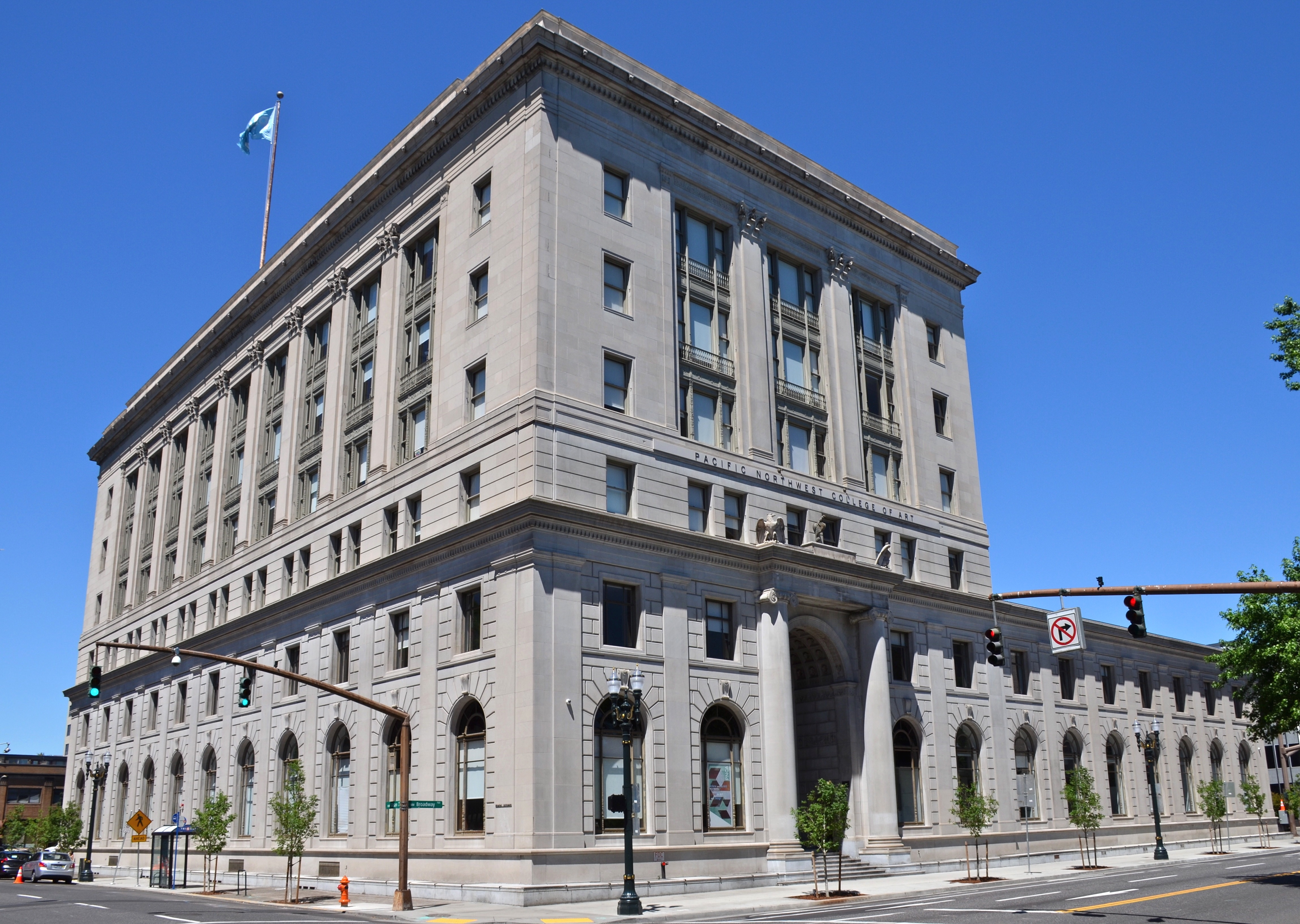
2015 picture, shortly after completion of renovation work

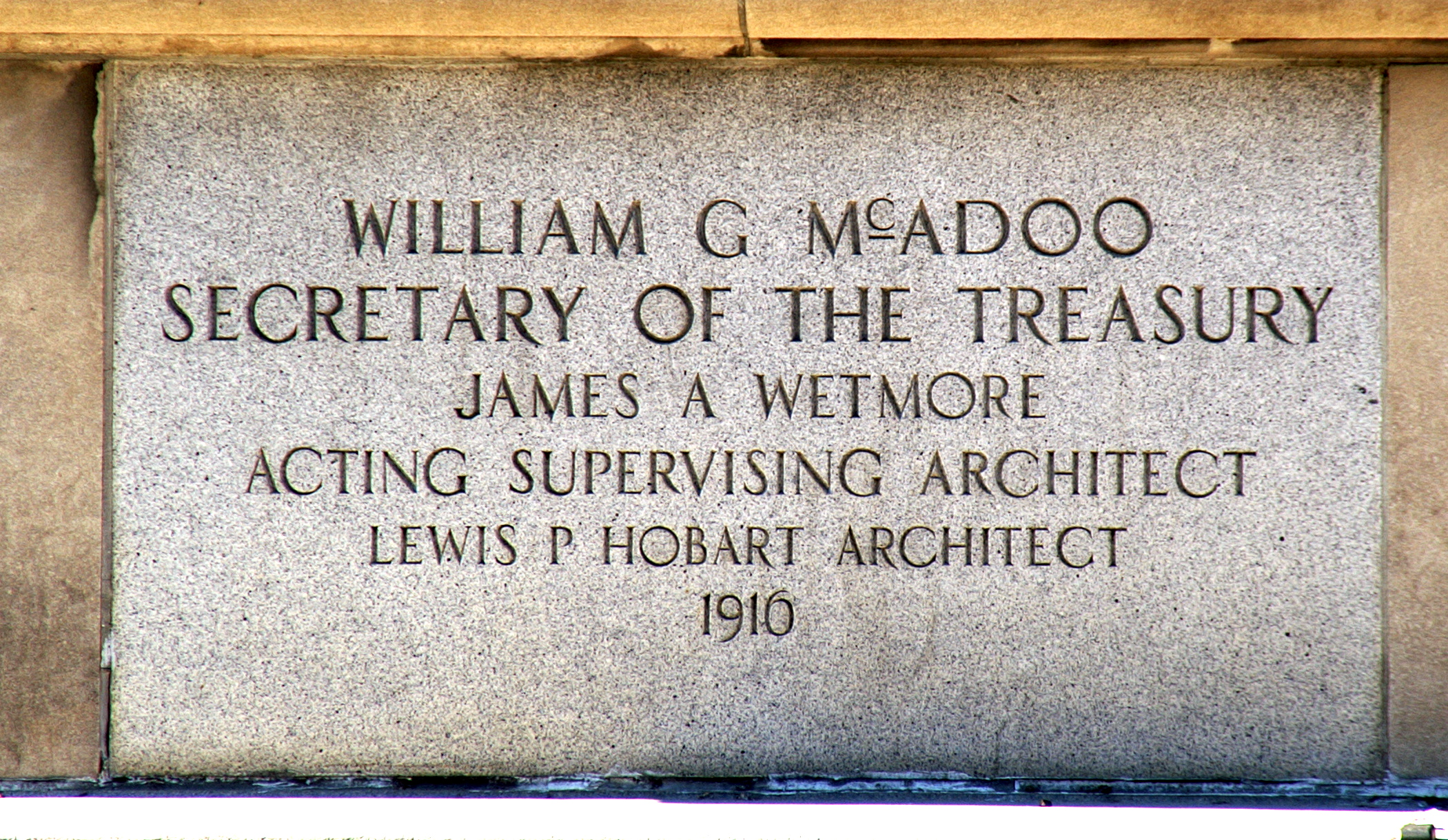
511 Building Cornerstone

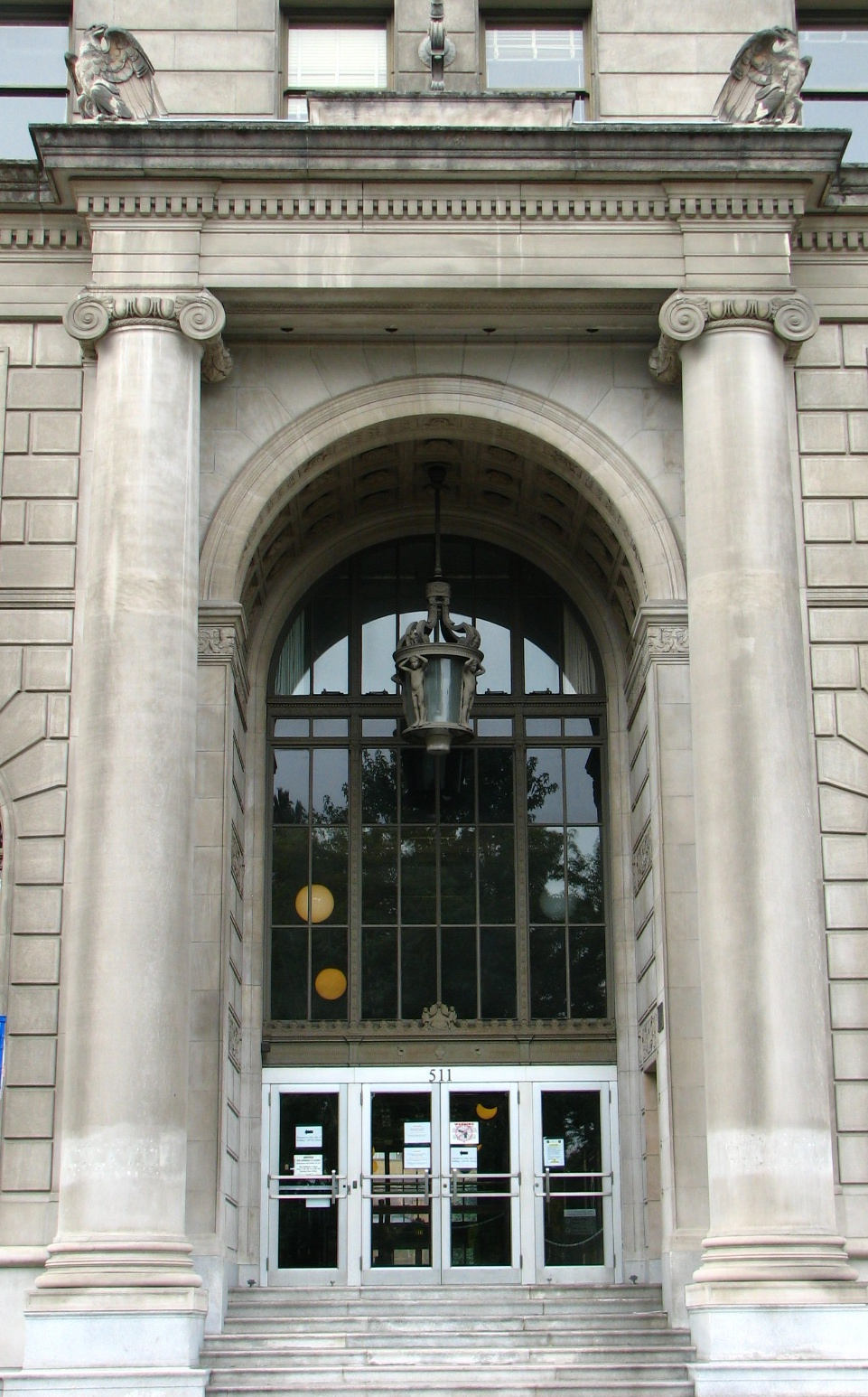
East entrance in 2008

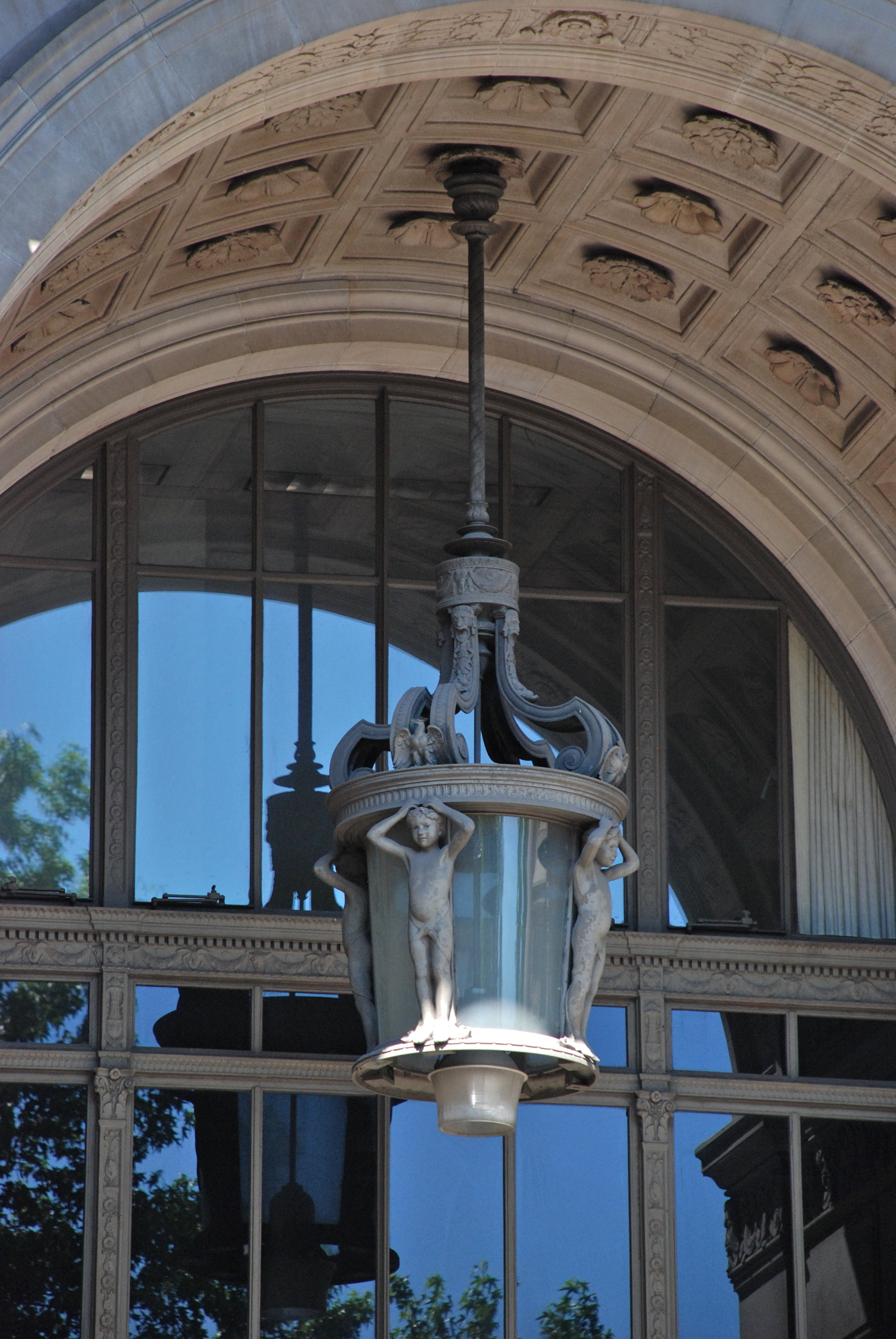
Cast bronze lamp over entrance
