= Macy's Union Square =

Department store building in San Francisco

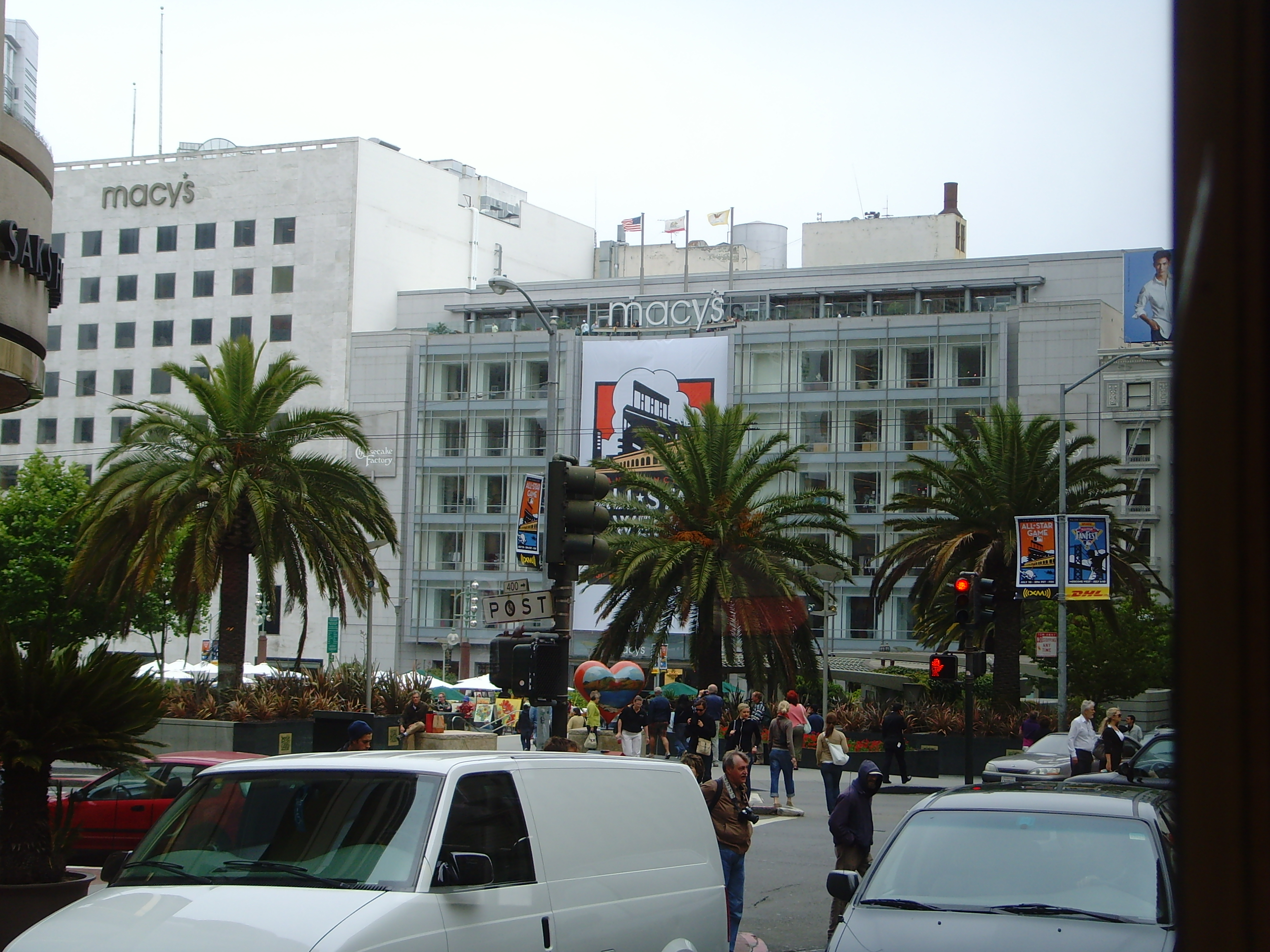
- Exterior of Macy's Union Square (2007)

General information
- Status: Open
- Type: Department store
- Architectural style: Neo-Gothic
- Location: 170 O'Farrell Street, San Francisco, California, United States
- Coordinates: 37.78702°N 122.40738°W
- Current tenants: Macy's
- Year built: 1928–1929
- Opened: October 16, 1947; 79 years ago (Macy's)
- Renovated: 1948–1949; 1955; 1967; 1976; 1998
- Owner: Macy's

Technical details
- Floor area: 700,000 square feet (65,000 m^{2}) of selling space

Design and construction
- Architect: Lewis P. Hobart

Website
- Store information

O'Connor Moffatt & Comapny Department Store Final Logo

Macy's Union Square is a department store building bounded by O'Farrell, Powell, Geary, and Stockton Streets in San Francisco, California, United States. The present-day building consists of several buildings that were built separately and later connected, the earliest of which was designed by Lewis P. Hobart for the O'Connor, Moffat, Kean Co. store in 1929. It has been the regional flagship store of the Macy's department store chain since 1949. In November of 2025, Macy's announced they are partnering with developer TMG Partners for the future development of its 600,000-square-foot store property, abandoning previously announced plans to leave the site in 2027.

== History ==
=== O'Connor, Moffat & Co. ===
Macy's San Francisco roots date back to 1866 and the founding of O'Connor, Moffat, Kean Co. at Second & Market Streets, eventually moving into several buildings on south Post Street, between Grant Avenue and Kearny Street, where it rebuilt after the 1906 San Francisco earthquake and reopened in March 1909.

In 1928, the company, by then known as O'Connor, Moffat & Co., commissioned Lewis P. Hobart to design a new eight-story store building at 101 Stockton Street at the northwest corner of O'Farrell Street, with a projected cost of $3,400,000 ($63 million in 2025).

The new 244,000 sq ft (22,700 m^{2}) O'Connor, Moffatt & Co. store opened to the public on March 4, 1929, clad in cream-colored terra-cotta that incorporated Neo-Gothic details, especially at the top of its façades.

=== 1945: Macy's San Francisco ===
R.H. Macy & Company, New York, New York acquired O'Connor Moffat in 1945 for a reported $2,175,000 in stock. On October 16, 1947, the store was rebranded as Macy's.

When announcing the merger, Macy's also announced the purchase of the six-story Brickell Building with 55 ft (17 m) of frontage on Geary Street facing Union Square, and took possession on January 1, 1946. At the time it was home to the Santa Fe Railroad ticket office (235 Geary) and the Frank More shoe store (233 Geary). A corridor gave access to Macy's from Union Square.

Macy's followed up with a major expansion of the store, incorporating 170 O'Farrell Street to the west, in 1948, commissioning the original architect of the 1928 building, Louis Parson Hobart.

The new addition, costing a reported $6,500,000 (($87.1 million in 2025) opened in September 1949, matched the façades of the older store, except at the parapet, where the florid Gothic detail was not replicated. A polished-granite first floor united both new and old parts of the store. In the interior, the 1949 remodeling kept the original square fluted columns, but a drop ceiling and "modern" lighting obscured the elaborate gothic tracery of the older store's street-floor ceiling.

=== Union Square side ===
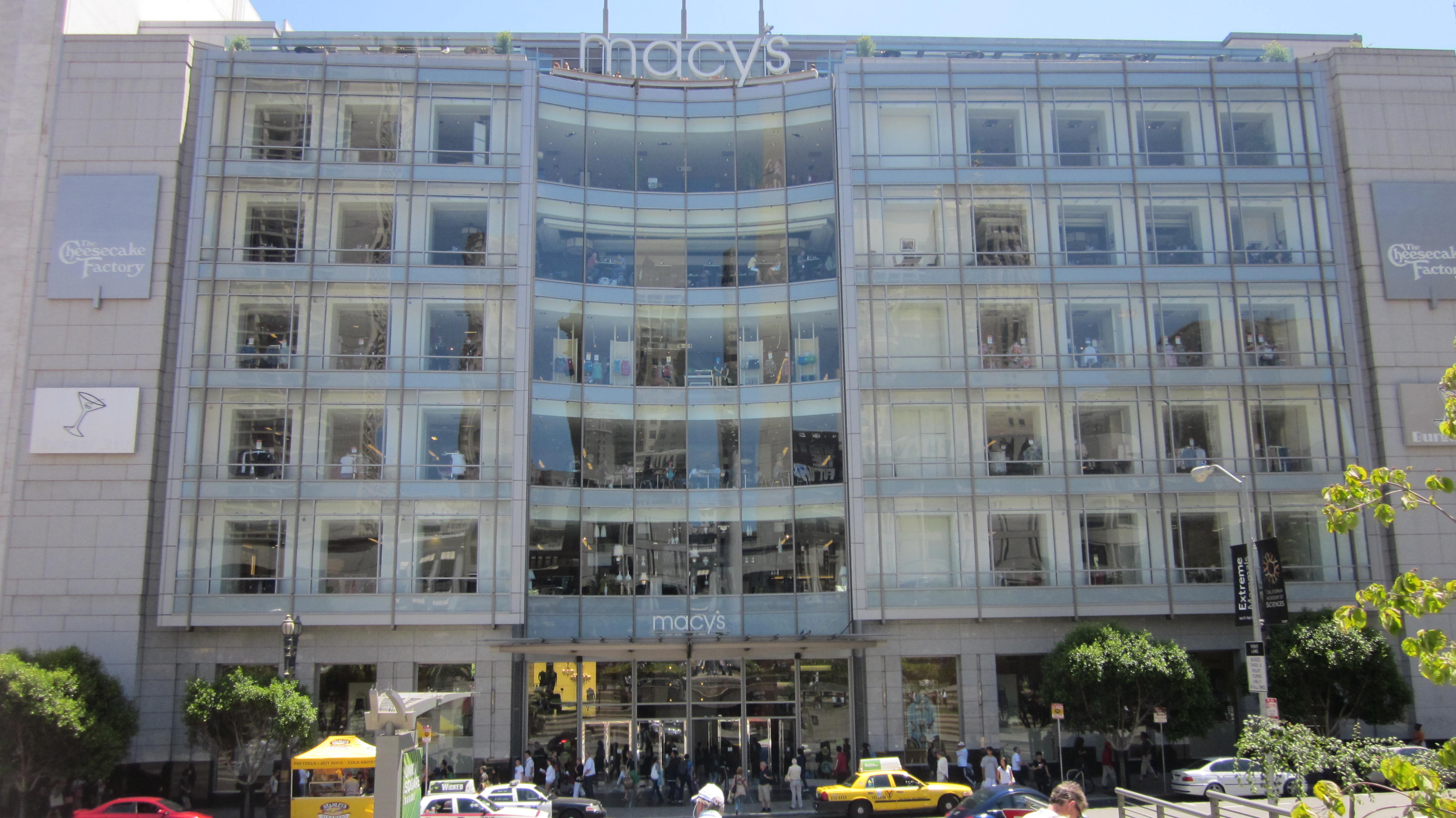
Union Square side, former Brickell/ Bally/ Dohrmann's sites

In 1955, the Brickell Building was refurbished, after which Macy's customers could enter the store through the Blum's Confectionery, a candy store that incorporated a café serving desserts and light meals.

Macy's acquired the 76,000-square-foot (7,100 m^{2}) Dohrmann's home furnishings store, demolished it in 1967 and constructed a building on the site that was added to the main store. The new front incorporated a clock tower worked into the façade design.

Eventually the front of the Brickell Building was also redone so that it matched the 1968 addition on the Dohrmann's site. The floor elevation of the 1968 addition did not align with the main (1929/1948) building, so escalators at the street floor of the Union Square buildings connected down to the main floor and up to the second floor of the older portion of the store.

in 1976, Macy's bought the 40,000 sq ft (3,700 m^{2}) building at 255 Geary, for decades, home to Frank Werner shoes, sold in 1952 to Bally of Switzerland.

=== Men's Store building ===
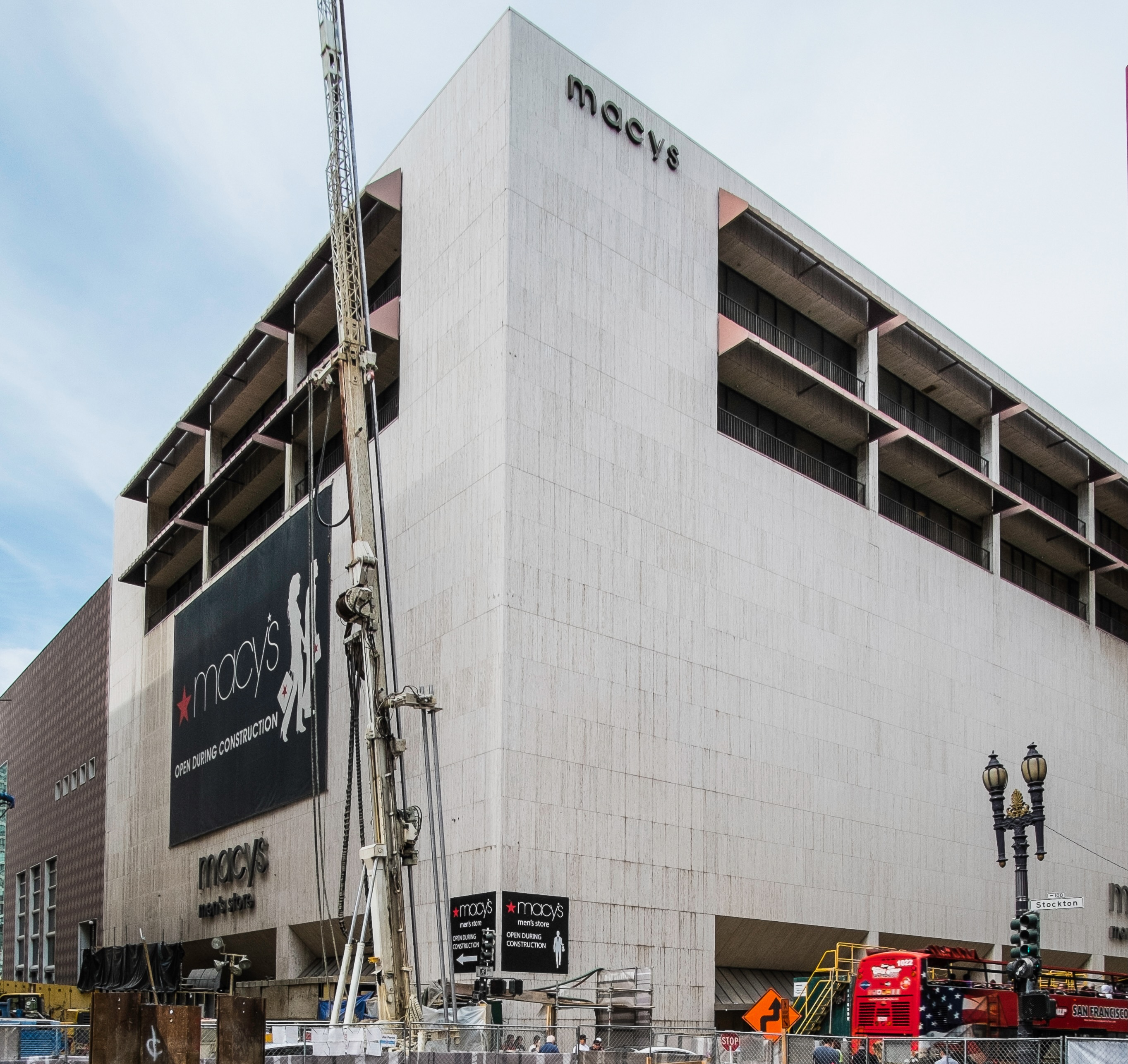
Men's Store (1984–2017)

In 1984, Macy's opened a separate 180,000 sq ft (17,000 m^{2}) separate Men's Store in a building across Stockton Street from its Main Store. The building at 100-120 Stockton Street was built in 1974 and previously a branch of the Hawaii-based Liberty House (department store), bringing the total area of the complex to 860,000 sq ft (80,000 m^{2}).

=== I. Magnin building ===
In 1995, Federated Department Stores, which owned both Macy's and I. Magnin specialty department stores, closed the I. Magnin chain. Macy's 1929/1948 building and its Union Square-facing buildings formed an "L" shape surrounding the I. Magnin Union Square store at the southwest corner of Stockton and Geary streets, built in 1946. In 1995, Federated decided to incorporate the 240,000 sq ft (22,000 m^{2}) building as part of Macy's Union Square, which meant that Macy's then occupied the entire block facing Stockton street from O'Farrell Street on the south to Geary Street and Union Square on the north.

The entire complex including the Men's Store thus reached its peak size of approximately 1,100,000 sq ft (100,000 m^{2}), one of the largest department store locations in the world at that time. This was at a time when most other downtown flagship stores in large U.S. cities other than New York and Chicago had already closed, such as May Co. in Los Angeles (1986), Bullock's and J.W. Robinson's in Los Angeles (1983), Rich's in Atlanta (1994), May Co. in Cleveland (1993), and Hudson's in Detroit (1983). Even Macy's Union Square's own local rival Emporium would close its flagship the next year, in 1996.

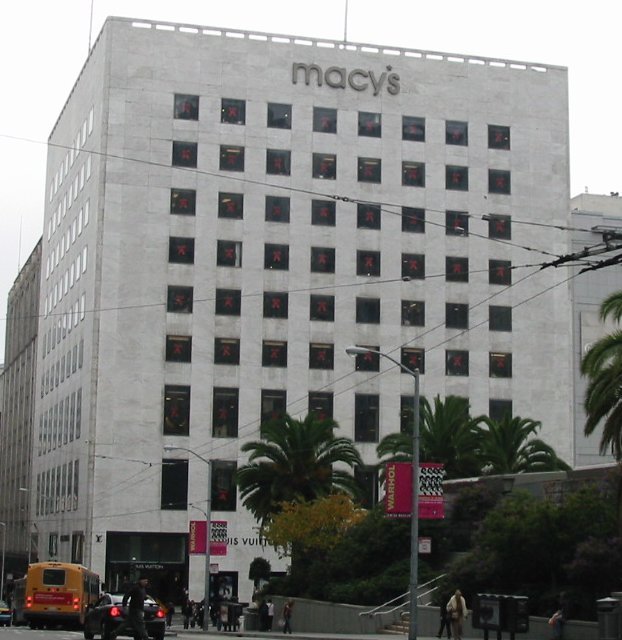
I. Magnin Building, part of Macy's Union Square 1995-2018

In the late 1990s Macy's began a multi-year project to rehabilitate the entire complex, remodeling of the 1929/1948 building and the Men's Store; expanding into the upper floors of the Magnin's building, and razing and replacing the two out-of-date buildings on Geary Street facing Union Square (on the Brickell and Dohrmann's sites), giving the store its current signature glass-fronted entry from the Square.

In 2018, Macy's proceeded to sell both of its most recent additions: the former I. Magnin building that had been incorporated into the main complex, and the separate Men's Store (former Liberty House) building. The complex, now reduced back to its pre-1984 size, still boasts about 700,000 sq ft (65,000 m^{2}) of retail space.

=== Closure Plans & Current Plans ===
On February 27, 2024, it was announced that Macy's would be closing this location as part of a plan to close 150 stores nationwide by the end of 2026. Macy's stated that the location would remain open until the property would be sold to a new owner. More than 400 employees will be impacted as part of the closure. In November of 2025, Macy's announced they are partnering with developer TMG Partners for the future development of its 600,000-square-foot store property, abandoning previously announced plans to leave the site in 2027.

== Table of buildings and additions ==
Opened/ Added	Sold	Building	Address	Area added sq ft	Total area sq ft	Total area sq m
1929	open	O'Connor, Moffat & Co. building (Macy's Main Building)	101 Stockton corner of O'Farrell	244,000	244,000	22,700
1948	open	Addition to main store, west along O'Farrell plus Brickell Building on Geary	160‑170 O'Farrell, 233-235 Geary	244,000 (approx.)	488,000 (approx.)	45,300 (approx.)
1967	open	Dohrmann's building (76,000 sq ft (76,000 sq ft)) razed; new building on its site added to Macy's main store.	281 Geary on Union Square		640,000	59,000
1976	open	Bought and expanded into former Frank Werner/Bally Building	255 Geary on Union Square	40,000	680,000	63,000
Sep 30, 1984	2018	Separate Men's Store in the old Liberty House store	100-120 Stockton	180,000	860,000	80,000
1995*	2018*	Expansion into former I. Magnin Building	135 Stockton corner of Geary on Union Square	240,000	1,100,000	100,000
1998	2024	Reconstruction of 1967/1976 bldgs. on Union Square (263,640 sq ft)	(235)-255-281 Geary on Union Square		ca. 1,100,000	ca. 100,000
Total current floor area of complex after closing of ex-Magnin and Men's buildings: 700,000 sq ft (65,000 m^{2})

*announced

== Gallery ==
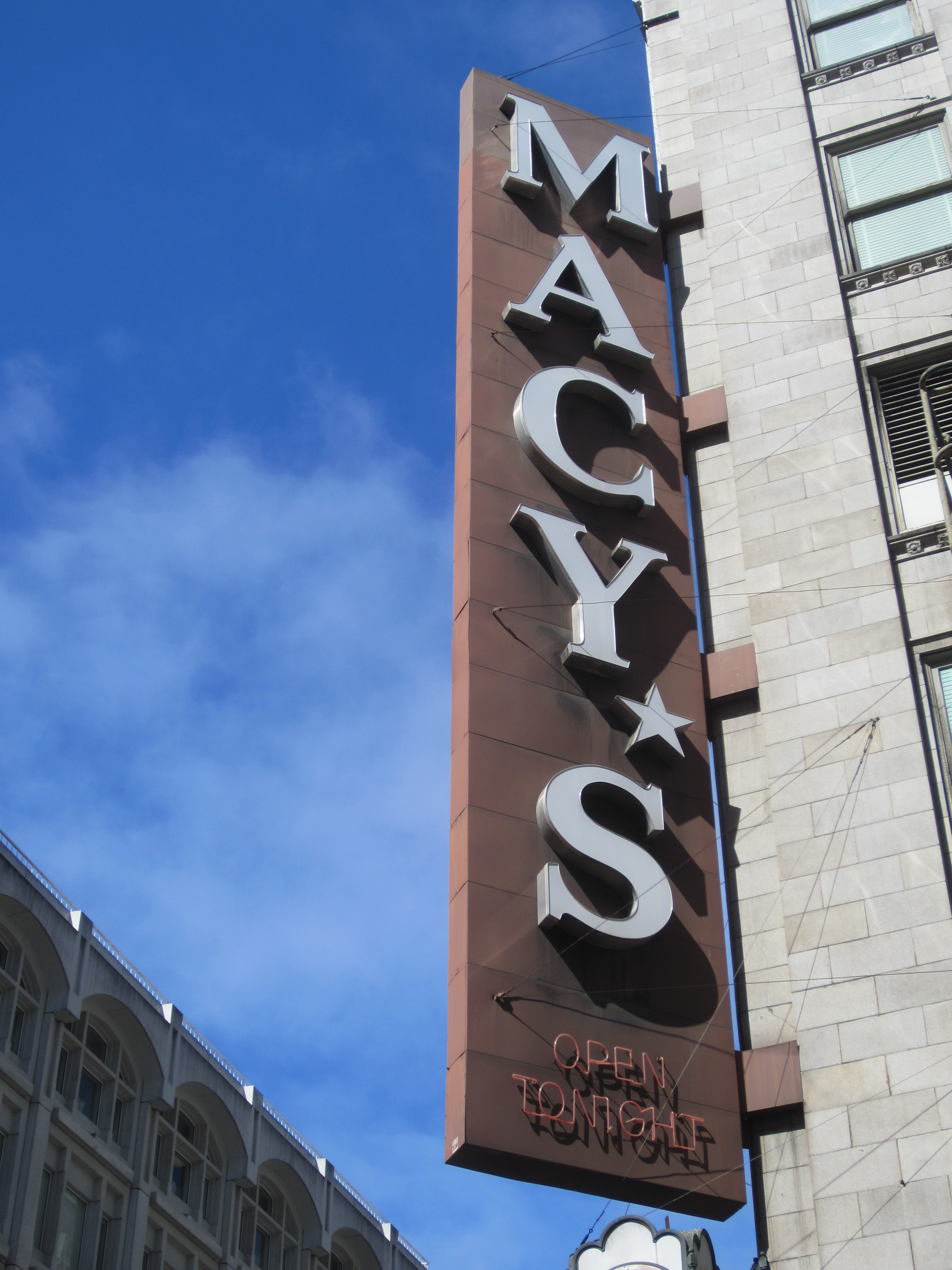
Signage on oldest part of the store, O'Farrell and Stockton

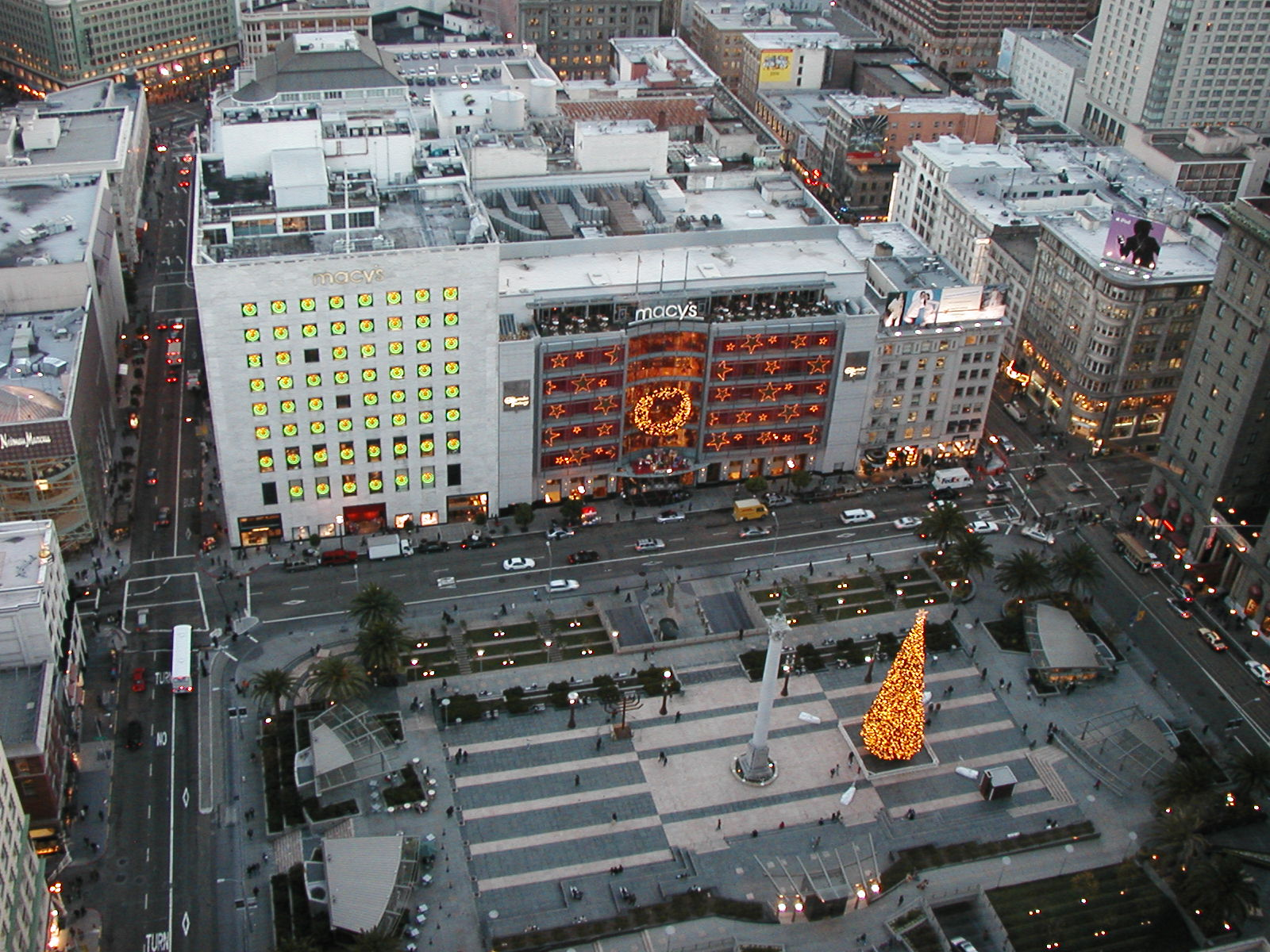
Aerial view of Union Square side at Yuletide

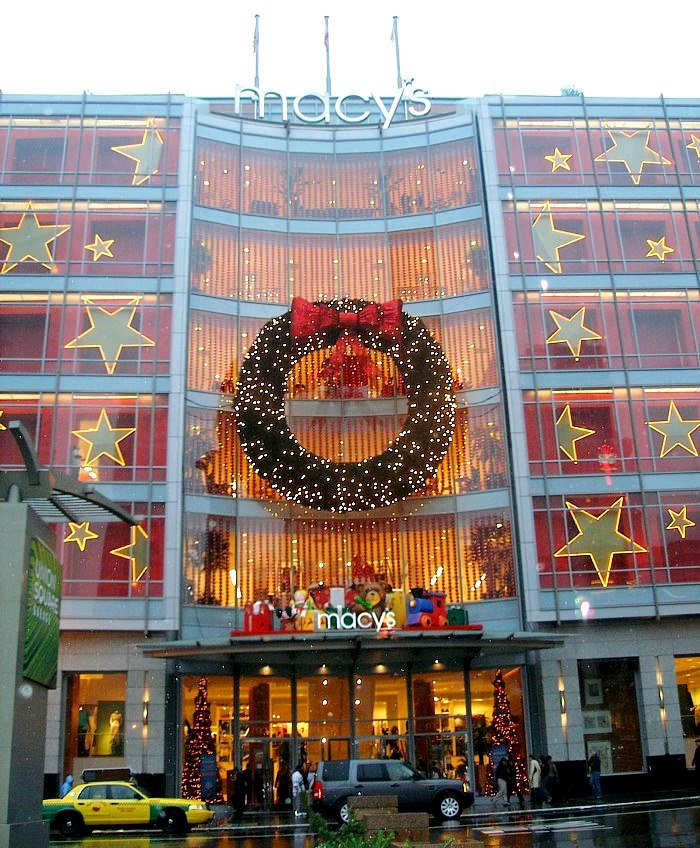
The entrance facing Union Square decorated for Yuletide by day…

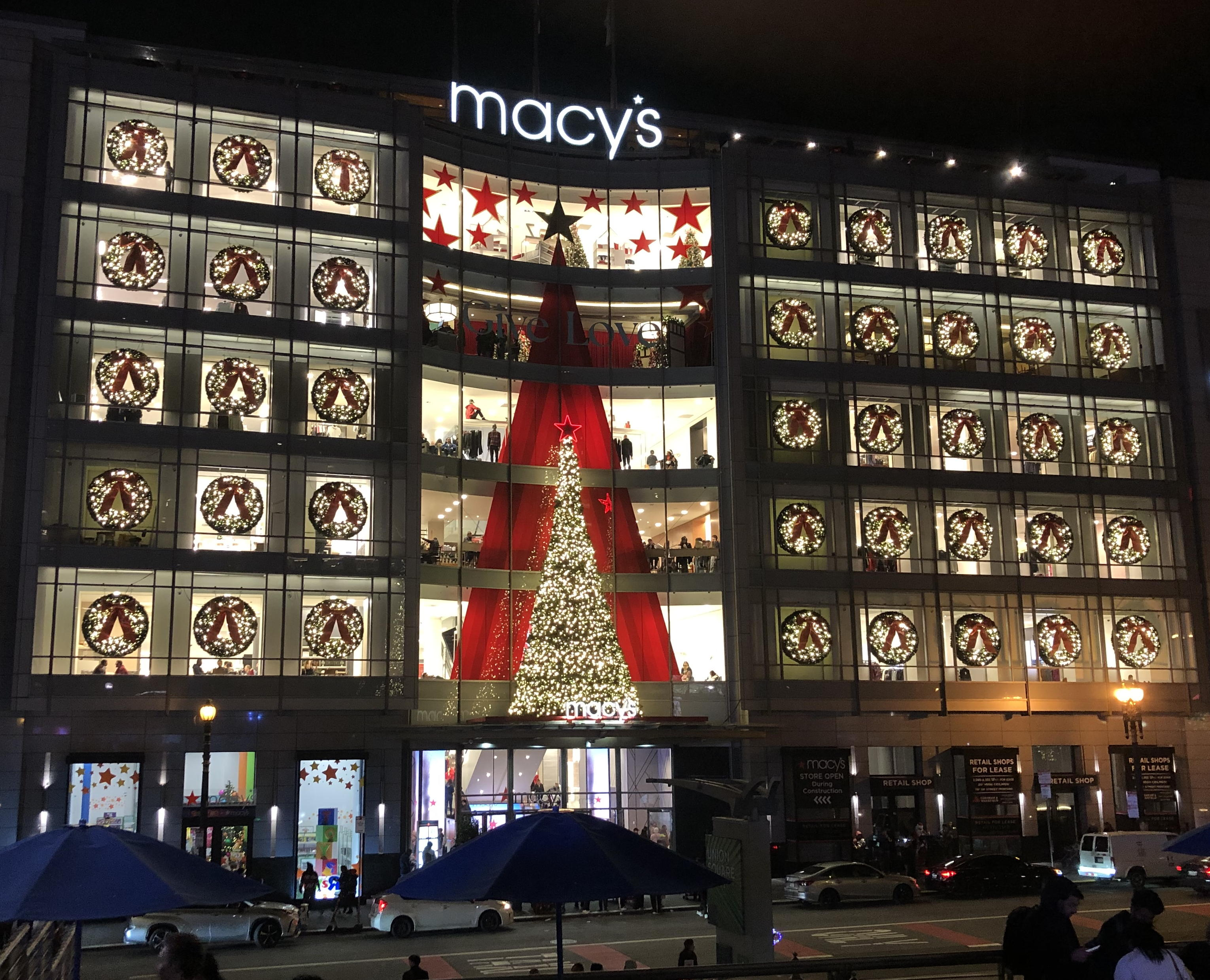
…and at night. (Photo by Steven Saylor)

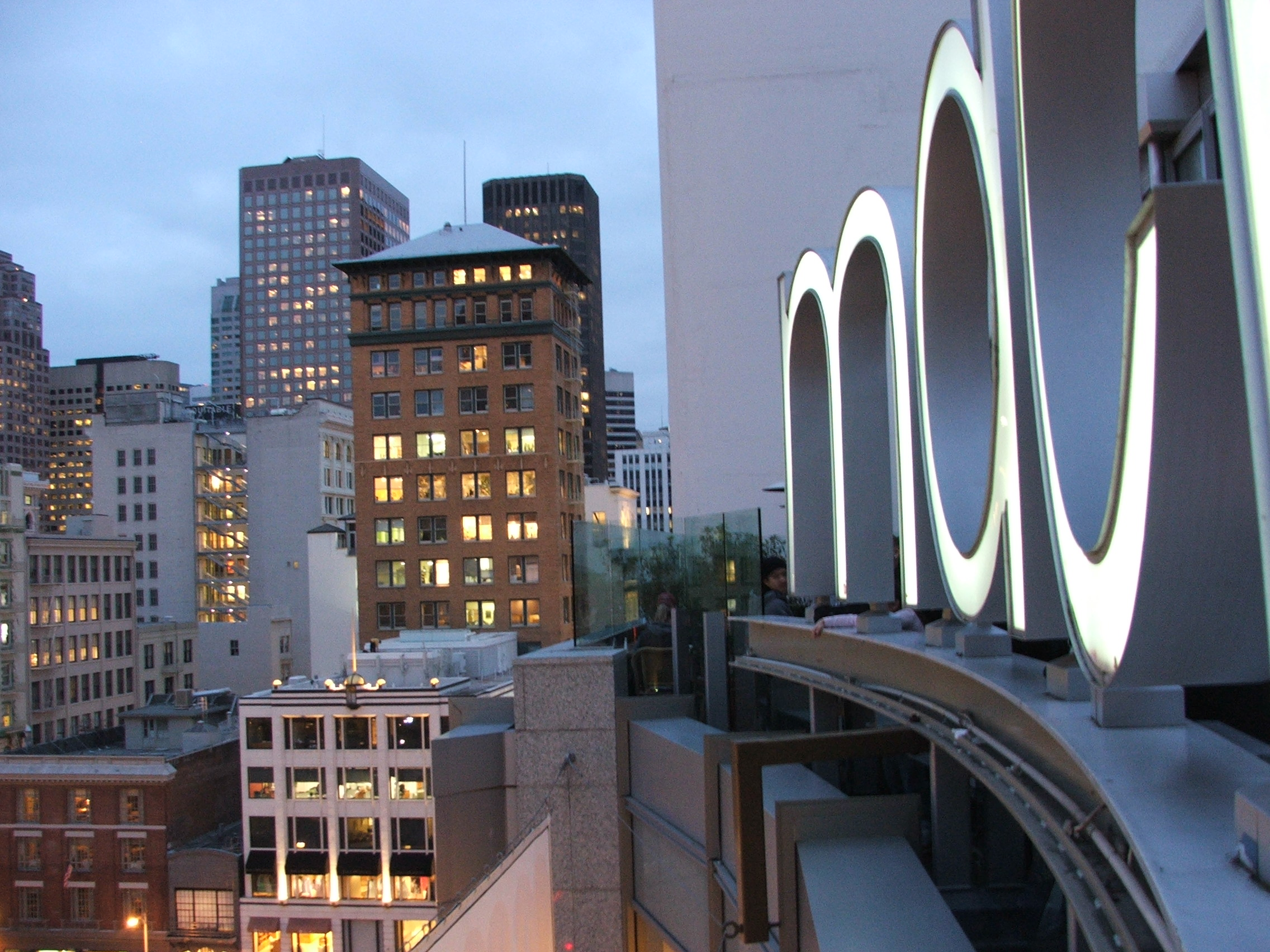
View of roof

== See also ==
- List of department stores converted to Macy's
