= Henry Hill (American architect) =

English-born American architect

Albert Henry Hill
- Born: July 9, 1913; England
- Died: December 5, 1984 (aged 71); Carmel-by-the-Sea, California, US
- Education: University of California, Berkeley
- Occupation: Architect

Albert Henry Hill (July 9, 1913 – December 5, 1984) was an American architect. Hill played a significant role in the development of the Second Bay Tradition architectural style.

== Early life ==
Hill was born in England to American parents. His mother was Anita Jeffress-Hill. His mother and her children moved back to the US and settled in Berkeley, California near the Claremont hotel. He studied architecture at the University of California, Berkeley graduating in 1936 and at Harvard's Graduate School of Design, where he worked under Walter Gropius and Marcel Breuer.

== Career ==
After earning his master's degree in architecture in 1938, he returned to the Bay Area, joining the office of John Ekin Dinwiddie in San Francisco and making partner in 1939. During World War II Hill served as a captain in the U.S. Army Corps of Engineers. When the war ended, he rejoined Dinwiddie and a new partner, Erich Mendelsohn, a well-known German architect who had fled the Third Reich.

In 1943, Hill was invited to showcase his work in MoMa's Five California Houses exhibition along with Richard Neutra, William Wurster and John Ekin Dinwiddie, which was to demonstrate the "highly characteristic architecture, indigenous to Western climate and living habits".

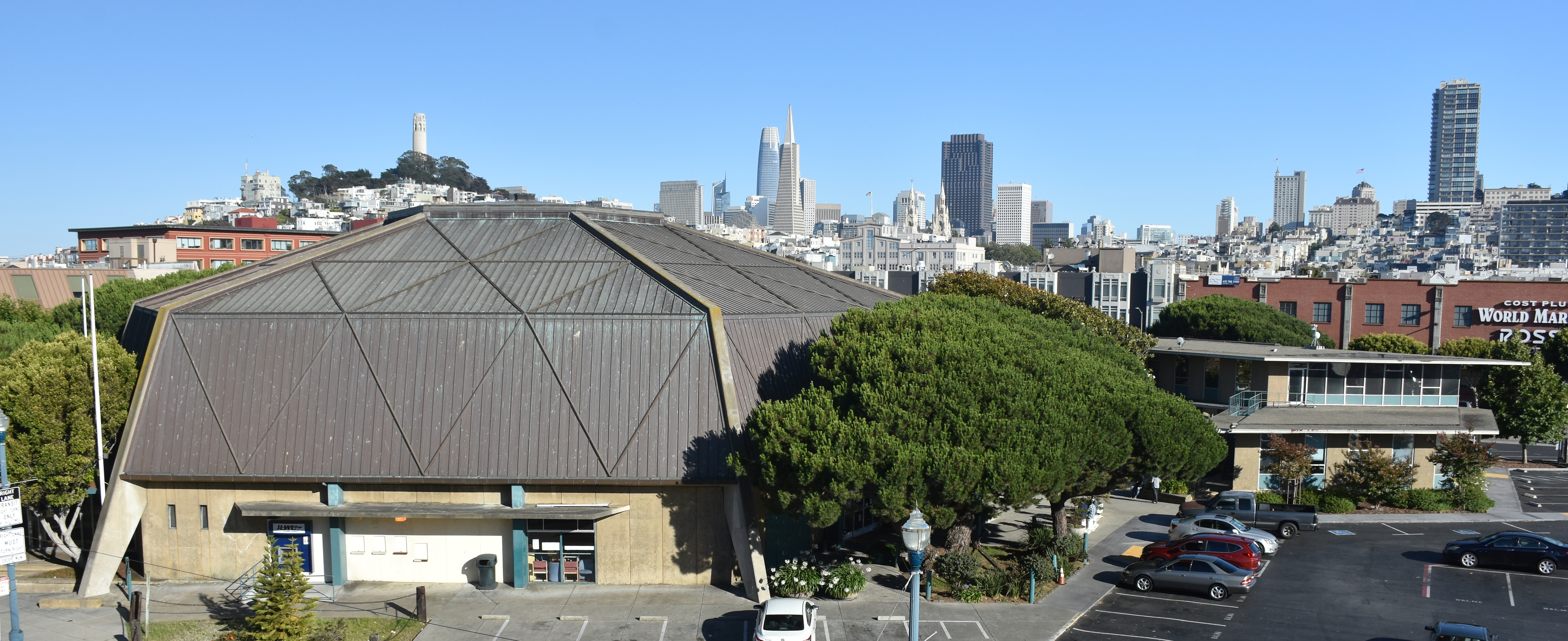
Longshoremen's Hall in San Francisco's Fisherman's Wharf, designed by Hill

In 1947, Hill established his own practice in San Francisco, designing residences and commercial buildings for clients in the Bay Area and elsewhere in the US. In 1965, Hill made his long-time associate John Kruse partner, and continued their partnership as Hill & Kruse Architects. The Longshoremen's Hall in San Francisco's Fisherman's Wharf was designed by Hill.

According to SFGATE, Hill "helped define the woodsy Second Bay Tradition, which combined the rigors of the International Style with regional, vernacular influences".

The Hill & Kruse Collection at the Environmental Design Archives at UC Berkeley includes project files, drawings, and materials on Hill's ideas, thoughts, and influences on his designs.

In 1948, he crafted and built a weekend cottage located at 7th and Camino Real in Carmel-by-the-Sea, California. He built three neighboring houses on Lopez Avenue. In 1971, Hill transformed his vacation home into his main dwelling, engaging with the local community by joining the Carmel Planning Commission. In 1973, Hill made the additions to the Carmel City Hall at the south side elevation for the City Planning Department.

== Death ==
On December 5, 1984, Hill died at his residence in Carmel.
