= Second Bay Tradition =

The Second Bay Tradition (or Second Bay Area Tradition) is an architectural style from the period of 1928 through 1942 that was rooted in San Francisco and the greater Bay Area. Also referred to as "redwood post and beam", the style is characterized by a rustic, woodsy philosophy and features sleek lines and machine aesthetic. Associated with European Modernism, the architects Gardner Dailey, William Merchant, Henry Hill, and William Wurster designed in the style. A repository of drawings and specifications from the tradition are housed at the Environmental Design Archives at the University of California, Berkeley.

The Second Bay Area Tradition began in the 1920s, with William Wurster emerging as a key figure. His ranch-style house, Gregory Farmhouse, built in 1928 in Scotts Valley, California exemplified this phase. After World War II, the tradition continued with contributions from Wurster, Gardner Dailey, and John Funk, joined by Joseph Esherick, Mario Corbett, Roger Lee, and Henry Hill. The Third Bay Tradition phase followed, spanning from 1945 through the 1980s.

== See also ==
- First Bay Tradition
- Third Bay Tradition
