= Priesterbäker See =

Lake in Mecklenburg-Vorpommern, Germany

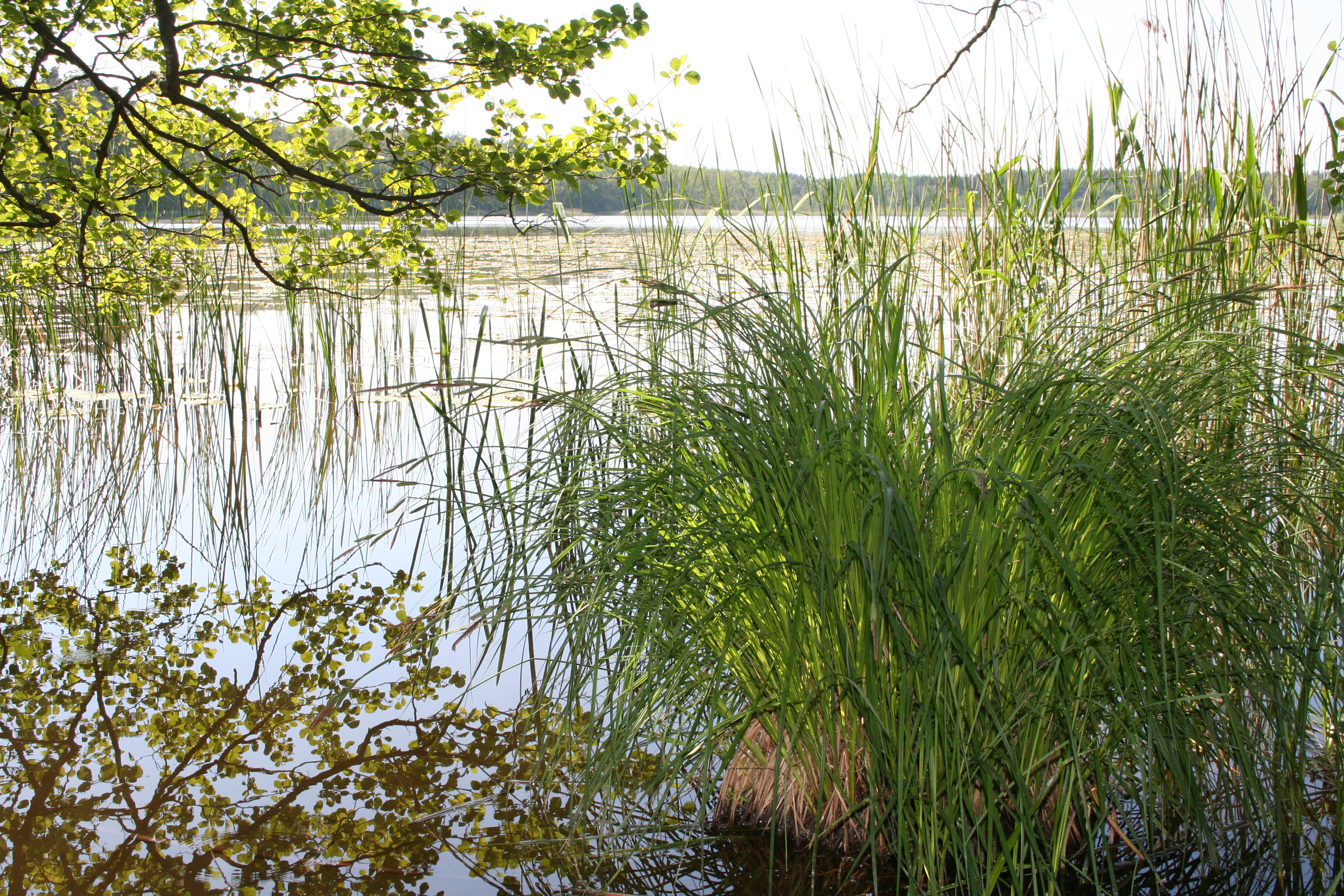

- Location within Mecklenburg-Vorpommern
- Location: Müritz National Park, Mecklenburg-Vorpommern
- Coordinates: 53.42125°N 12.84228°E
- Basin countries: Germany
- Max. length: 2.38 km (1.48 mi)
- Max. width: 0.99 km (0.62 mi)
- Surface area: 1.53 km^{2} (0.59 sq mi)
- Surface elevation: 62.6 m (205 ft)

Priesterbäker See is a lake in Müritz National Park, Mecklenburg-Vorpommern, Germany. At an elevation of 62.6 m, its surface area is 1.53 km².
