= Louis Christian Mullgardt =

American architect

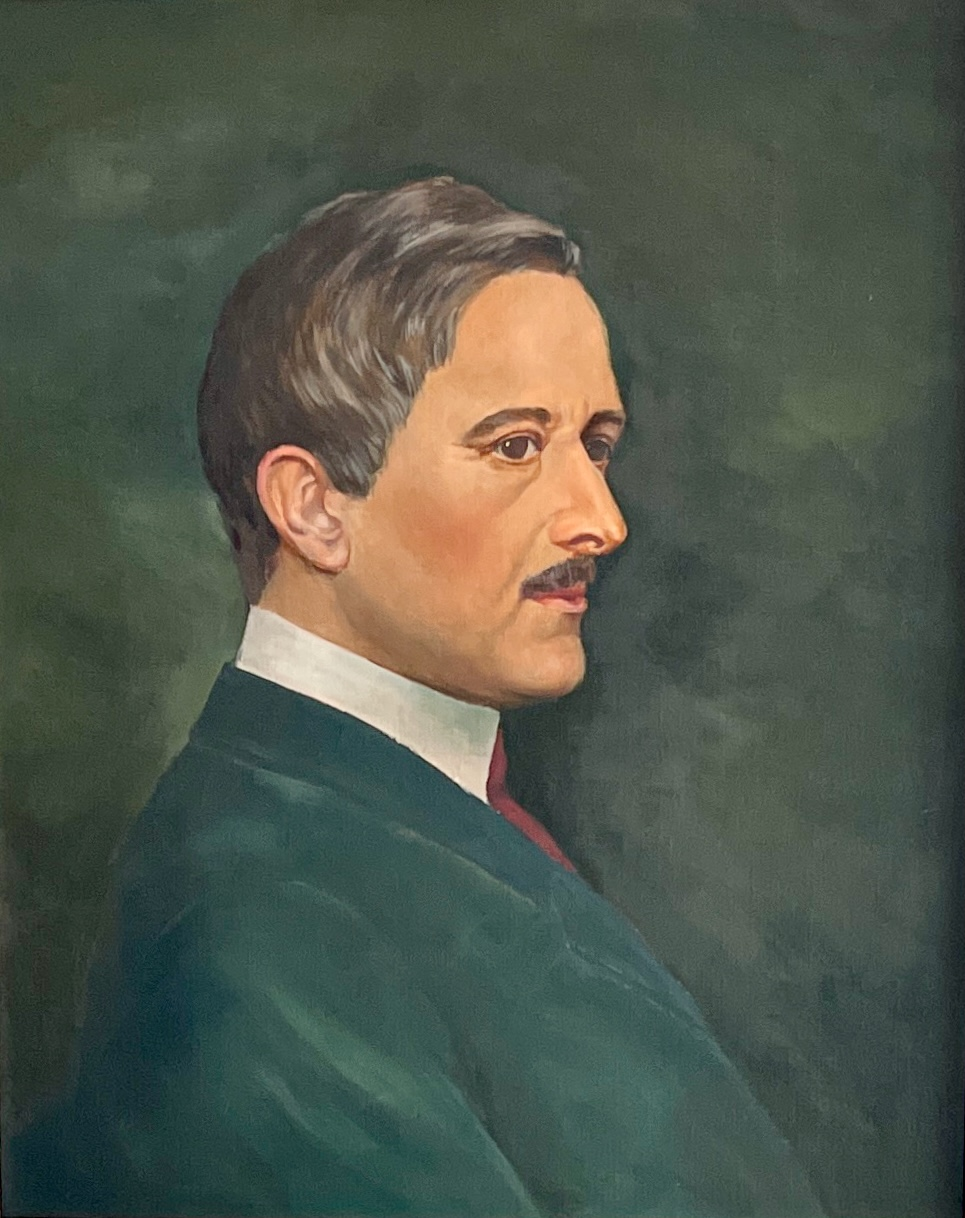
- Born: January 18, 1866; Franklin County, Missouri
- Died: January 12, 1942 (aged 75); San Francisco, California
- Education: Harvard University
- Occupation: Architect
- Spouse: Laura R. Steffens (m. 1897)
- Children: 2

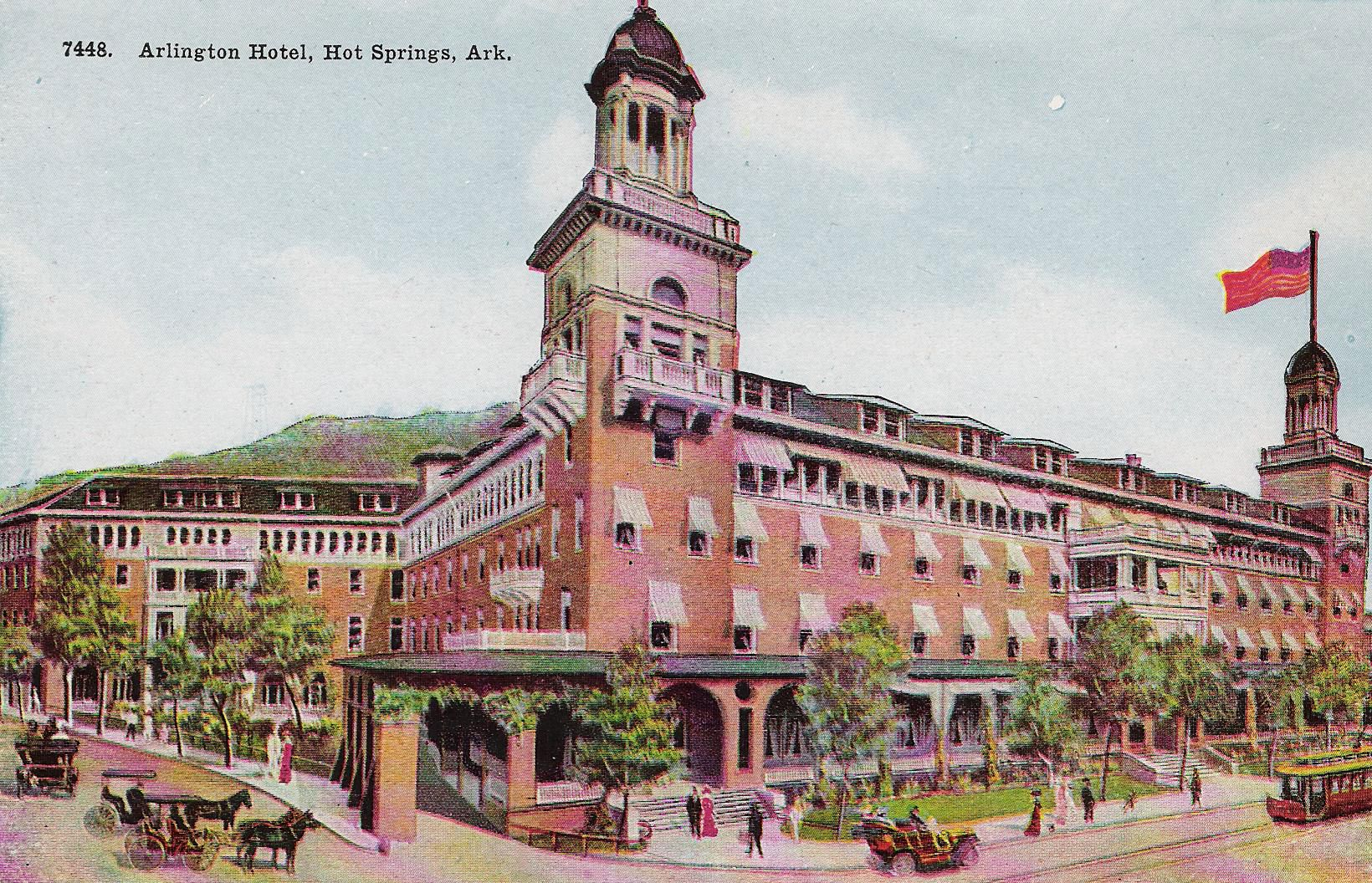
The Arlington Hotel, designed by the architectural firm of McClure, Stewart, and Mullgardt of St. Louis

Louis Christian Mullgardt (1866-1942) was an American architect associated with the First Bay Tradition.

== Early life and education ==
Mullgardt was born in Franklin County, Missouri on January 18, 1866. His earlier years were spent in St. Louis, where he began the study of architecture. Subsequently, he continued his studies at Harvard University. Following this, he went to Chicago, where he began designing. In 1893, he entered private practice in St. Louis. In 1895, he made an extended trip to Europe for further study.

== Career ==
He designed houses in Berkeley, Oakland and other cities; the Court of the Ages at the 1915 Panama–Pacific International Exposition; the San Francisco Juvenile Court and Detention Home; the Durant School in Oakland; and a major renovation of the former M. H. de Young Memorial Museum.

He made design proposals for multi-building complexes for downtown Honolulu in 1915 and for Yosemite Valley in 1916. He was hired in 1918 to design the Lou Henry and Herbert Hoover House at Stanford University but was dismissed after prematurely publicizing the assignment without the Hoovers' consent.

In 1902, he was commissioned to go to Manchester, England, and in 1903, to London and Scotland. He moved to San Francisco in 1905 and established a solo office.

Mullgardt was active in several organizations of architects and artists. He served as president of the San Francisco Society of Architects, president of the California Society of Etchers, vice-president of the San Francisco Society of Artists, director of the San Francisco Art Association, and Secretary of the Group Jury for Etchings and Engravings of the Panama-Pacific International Exposition.

== Personal life ==
He married Laura R. Steffens in Chicago on June 9, 1897, and they had two children.

== Death and legacy ==
He died in San Francisco on January 12, 1942.

Art historian Robert Judson Clark was the leading expert on Mullgardt until his death in 2011. He wrote the catalog essay on the architect for a 1966 exhibition at the University of California, Santa Barbara and the M.H. de Young Memorial Museum.

== Published writing ==
- (1915) The Architecture & Landscape Gardening of the Exposition
