= Phyllis Gardner (clinical pharmacologist) =

American physician and academic (1950–2025)

- Born: Phyllis Irene Gardner; July 7, 1950; Ames, Iowa, U.S.
- Died: September 10, 2025 (aged 75); Martha's Vineyard, Massachusetts
- Education: University of Illinois, Urbana-Champaign (BS); Harvard University (MD)
- Years active: 1976–2025
- Known for: Early skeptic of Elizabeth Holmes; Ion channel biophysics
- Board member of: Harvard Medical School Board of Fellows
- Spouse: Andrew Perlman
- Children: 2
- Awards: Burroughs Wellcome Faculty Scholar; Judith Pool Award
- Scientific career
- Fields: Clinical pharmacology; Internal medicine; Cardiac arrhythmia; Ion channel biophysics; Cell biology; Cystic fibrosis pathogenesis; Gene therapy; Heart failure; Heart transplantation
- Workplaces: Stanford University School of Medicine
- Notable students: Elizabeth Holmes

Phyllis Irene Gardner (July 7, 1950 – September 10, 2025) was an American pharmacologist and academic who was a professor of medicine at the Stanford University School of Medicine, and dean of education. Gardner was one of the first people to be publicly skeptical of Elizabeth Holmes, the founder of blood testing company Theranos, who was later found guilty of investor fraud in the federal case, United States v. Elizabeth A. Holmes, et al.. Born in Ames, Iowa, her father was an agronomy professor at Iowa State University. Gardner studied biology at University of Illinois Urbana-Champaign, where she was Phi Beta Kappa and Phi Kappa Phi. She went on to Harvard Medical School, graduating with high honors in the Alpha Omega Alpha society.

After medical school, Gardner started a residency in internal medicine at the Massachusetts General Hospital, before completing her medical training as chief resident at the Stanford School of Medicine. She subsequently went on to fellowships at both Columbia University College of Physicians and Surgeons and University College London. Gardner returned to Stanford University to become a professor of clinical pharmacology. She carried out research in cardiac arrhythmias and cystic fibrosis pathogenesis. Stanford University later gave her the position of Senior Associate Dean for Education and Student Affairs.

Gardner continued her research while at Stanford University, and her laboratory was focused on ion channel biophysics. She was published in peer-reviewed scientific journals including Nature, Science, and The Lancet. She maintained her positions at Stanford University, while simultaneously branching out into entrepreneurship. She advised biotech firms on venture capital, and served in research at Alza Corporation.

== Early life and education ==
Gardner was born on July 7, 1950, in Ames, Iowa to parents Frank Gardner and Opal Gardner, (née Van Winkle). Her mother and father met when they were both attending Berea College in Berea, Kentucky; a school intended for Appalachian Americans. Her father enlisted in the U.S. military during World War II, and her mother traveled to where he was stationed and they were wed in an elopement.

During his time in the military, her father was a drill instructor, and her mother followed her father to his stations in the Southern U.S. throughout the war. Her father was sent off to fight during the war in Europe, and upon returning to the U.S. he continued his studies at Virginia Tech under the G.I. Bill. Her father worked as a professor at Iowa State University, where he taught courses to college students in the field of agronomy while simultaneously completing his PhD in the field. Her early life was spent in Iowa growing up with her sister and brother, Colleen Gardner and Donald Gardner, and the three siblings maintained close ties in later years as well. Gardner's father went on to University of Georgia where he became an assistant professor, and subsequently to Ohio State University where he served as an associate professor. He later returned to Ames, Iowa to accept a position as a full professor back at Iowa State University. The family later moved to Stillwater, Oklahoma as her father took up a position as department chair at Oklahoma State University. After his academic teaching career, her father retired while employed at the University of Florida in Gainesville, Florida.

Through her father's side of the family, she was descended from American Revolutionary War soldier James Gardner, who settled after the war in Hillsville, Virginia. The Gardner family in Virginia were mainly farmers. Her father was one of seven children. Five of his siblings went to college and post-graduate studies as well, and those became educators or professors.

Gardner's mother was a religious Christian and a teetotaler. Her mother grew up in Kentucky in a family supported by a father, John Van Winkle, who worked in coal mining. Through her maternal grandfather, she was related to the Van Winkle family that settled in Hudson Valley, New York. A group of her Van Winkle ancestors from the Hudson Valley later moved to Kentucky. Gardner's maternal grandmother was Mamie Rose of Ohio. Through this grandmother, she was related to major league baseball player, Pete Rose.

Gardner completed her bachelor's degree in 1972 at the University of Illinois Urbana-Champaign, where she specialized in biology. During her undergraduate years, her father served as dean at the same school. Upon graduation from the University of Illinois Urbana-Champaign, she received honors including: the Bronze Tablet, Phi Beta Kappa and Phi Kappa Phi. Gardner was the second person from her university to be admitted to Harvard Medical School.

Gardner studied at Harvard Medical School and graduated in 1976. She enjoyed her time studying at Harvard Medical School, where she lived in the graduate student housing on campus, Vanderbilt Hall. She achieved high honors at Harvard Medical School, and graduated with the distinction: Alpha Omega Alpha. She held a license to practice medicine in California from 1979. Gardner trained in internal medicine at the Massachusetts General Hospital. She was a chief resident at the Stanford School of Medicine. She chose the path of pursuing the chief resident track at Stanford after her initial residency in internal medicine at Mass General, due to her interest in continuing to focus on academic medicine. After Stanford, she moved to New York City and went on to a research fellowship at Columbia University College of Physicians and Surgeons. She subsequently moved to the United Kingdom, and became a postdoctoral fellow at University College London in 1982. She completed both research fellowships at Columbia University and the University College of London.

== Career ==
=== Academic research ===
Gardner joined Stanford University in 1984. Her initial role upon hiring in 1984 was as assistant professor of medicine and pharmacology. Gardner worked on cardiac arrhythmias and cystic fibrosis pathogenesis. Gardner was appointed Senior Associate Dean for Education and Student Affairs at Stanford University. She was a professor of clinical pharmacology.

Her role as Senior Associate Dean for Education and Student Affairs at Stanford University covered multiple responsibilities, with oversight into: all medical students, graduate students, and postdoctoral researchers; the campus library and lecture halls; and student services including admissions, and financial aid. When Gardner began the managerial role she found the prior structure in the system to be lacking in organization. She became an advocate to improve student services on campus and increase compassion among the employees towards those they served on campus. She lobbied Stanford University management and successfully had student services offices reorganized and moved closer to the center of campus. She discovered the medical school was at risk of losing its licensing status under the Liaison Committee on Medical Education (LCME). Gardner noted the LCME had reviewed the medical school and found the lecture halls dilapidated and the medical library inadequate in its facilities. She encouraged the medical students to complain to the administration. Gardner found herself unpopular with the other deans at the medical school due to her advocacy for improved student services on campus.

She led a laboratory that focused on ion channel biophysics. She felt she encountered unfavorable treatment by male management at Stanford due to being a woman physician. Upon her initial hiring as assistant professor of medicine and pharmacology, she was told she would be given a laboratory measuring 450 ft^{2}. However, when she came to the facility, she realized her laboratory was only 150 ft^{2} of space. She filed multiple memos and advocated for herself with Stanford management, eventually acquiring a laboratory multiple years later of 650 ft^{2}. She supported women in her department and told three female subordinates they should advocate for better compensation and more senior roles. Gardner believed her chairman of her department was not happy with her support of these female colleagues, and as retribution he neglected to publicize a posting for help with office management for her. This resulted in a significant delay for Gardner to gain secretarial help for her academic department.

In 2002, Gardner argued against a merger of University College London and Imperial College London. In 2003, Gardner testified to the United States House of Representatives on the subject matter of applications of biotechnology research in the United States. Gardner's medical and scientific research was published in multiple peer-reviewed scientific journals including Nature, Science, and The Lancet. She carried out research in 2013 while at Stanford, into the relationship between extracellular calcium upon t-cell receptor signaling. Gardner served on the Board of Fellows of the Harvard Medical School.

=== Entrepreneurship ===
After spending ten years in academia, Gardner became interested in research and development and entrepreneurship. She mentored women interested in pursuit of the field of science. She gained experience in companies seeking out venture capital funding. She developed several forms of slow released medication, including an adaptation for retention in the stomach.

Gardner was involved with several start-ups in the biotechnology and pharmaceutical industries. From 1994 to 1998, Gardner served as Vice President of Research and Head of the Technology Institute at the Alza Corporation. Gardner served as Director of the biopharmaceutical company Revance Therapeutics from 2007 to 2018. She was an adjunct partner at Essex Woodlands Health Ventures, from 1999 until 2015. She founded several companies, including the Genomics Collaborative, SKOLAR and the CambriaTech Holding Co. She was appointed to the board of directors of Ventaira Pharmaceuticals in 2006. She was appointed to the Board of Directors of CohBar, a clinical stage biotechnology company, in 2019.

In 2002, Elizabeth Holmes visited Gardner at Stanford University. Holmes proposed her idea for a microfluidic device that could detect and treat infectious diseases. Gardner was critical of the proposal, and told Holmes she did not think her invention would be successful. She explained to Holmes that it is not possible to use antibiotics on such a small scale. Holmes dropped out of Stanford a few months later, but Gardner followed the evolution of Theranos. Very briefly, both Gardner and Holmes served on the Harvard Medical School Board of Fellows after Holmes was given an invitation to join. Gardner vetoed requests by Stanford students to invite Holmes to speak on campus, and called for Holmes to be sent to prison when Theranos collapsed and charges were filed against Holmes. Holmes was ultimately found guilty of criminal fraud in the federal case United States v. Elizabeth A. Holmes, et al. which was brought by the United States against her and Theranos former president and COO Sunny Balwani.

== Personal life and death ==
Gardner was married in 1984 to Andrew Perlman, an executive within the biotechnology sector in the United States. Gardner initially encountered Perlman when he visited their mutual friend, physician and endocrinologist Andrew Hoffman, during Gardner's internal medicine residency training in Boston at Massachusetts General Hospital. Hoffman and Gardner worked together in the intensive care unit at the hospital. Perlman completed his undergraduate studies at the Massachusetts Institute of Technology, and then went to New York University where he earned both an M.D. and a Ph.D. degree from the same institution. Gardner and Perlman spent time together in California during their respective medical training after their initial meeting in Boston. During that time period, Gardner was completing her chief residency at Stanford University School of Medicine, and Perlman was studying in a residency for internal medicine. Their relationship continued in New York while Gardner was completing her pharmacology fellowship at Columbia University. They resided in England together during Gardner's studies at University College London as a pharmacology fellow.

Gardner and Perlman were wed in London on July 26, 1984. The couple came back to Stanford University in 1984 where Gardner took up a position as an assistant professor at the medical school in the fields of both pharmacology and medicine. Gardner and Perlman resided together on the campus of Stanford University during her time as a medical professor at the institution. Perlman briefly served on an advisory board for Theranos for a few months before the panel was shut down. Perlman learned that Theranos was a significant buyer of laboratory diagnostic testing equipment from the company Siemens.

Together with Perlman, Gardner had two children: Nicola Claire Perlman and Jay Gardner Perlman, in 1987 and 1989 respectively. Their daughter Nicola also studied medicine and became a physician. Like her mother, Nicola studied medicine at Harvard Medical School. After successfully completing medical school, Gardner's daughter carried out a residency in obstetrics and gynaecology through education at Massachusetts General Hospital and Brigham and Women's Hospital. Gardner & Perlman's son Jay graduated in 2012 with a degree in psychology from the Dornsife College of Letters, Arts and Sciences, at University of Southern California. Jay's positive experiences and comments about the support and resources at USC motivated his father to become a member of the USC Dornsife's Board of Councilors (BOC). Both Gardner and Perlman highly involved themselves in philanthropy and charitable giving. Perlman explained their motivation to give back to society saying, "We see philanthropy as a duty. And as a privilege." Gardner died of a heart attack on September 10, 2025, at the age of 75, while vacationing on Martha's Vineyard in Massachusetts.

== In media ==
The Wall Street Journal investigative journalist John Carreyrou delved into the manner in which Elizabeth Holmes failed to convince Gardner to involve herself in her company Theranos; he recounted this in-depth in his 2018 book, Bad Blood: Secrets and Lies in a Silicon Valley Startup. This relationship was investigated further in the 2019 Alex Gibney documentary, The Inventor: Out for Blood in Silicon Valley. Rebecca Jarvis delved into the early background between Gardner and Holmes, in her 2019 podcast about Theranos, The Dropout. In the 2022 show, The Dropout, based on the Jarvis podcast of the same name, Gardner appeared as a character, portrayed by Laurie Metcalf.

== Awards and honors ==
Year	Award	Category	Organization	Result	Ref.
1972	Graduated Bronze Tablet & Phi Beta Kappa & Phi Kappa Phi	Undergraduate studies	University of Illinois Urbana-Champaign	Won	
1976	Graduated Alpha Omega Alpha	Medical school studies	Harvard Medical School	Won	
1985	Faculty Development Award	Clinical Pharmacology	Pharmaceutical Research and Manufacturers of America (PhRMA)	Won	
1987	Burroughs Wellcome Faculty Scholar	Clinical Pharmacology	Burroughs Wellcome Fund	Won	
1998	NCC-AWIS Award	Judith Pool Award	Association for Women in Science	Won	

== Bibliography ==
=== Book chapters ===
- Gardner, Phyllis; Mcdonald, Thomas; Nishimoto, Ikuo; Wagner, John; Schumann, Muhammad; Chen, Jennifer; Schulman, Howard (1991), "Regulation of Lymphocyte Chloride Channels", The Identification of the CF (Cystic Fibrosis) Gene, Advances in Experimental Medicine and Biology, vol. 290, pp. 319–26, doi:10.1007/978-1-4684-5934-0_30, ISBN 978-1-4684-5936-4, PMID 1719768
- Premack, Brett A.; Gardner, Phyllis (2013), "Properties of CA Currents Activated by T Cell Receptor Signaling", in DeFranco, Anthony; Perlmutter, Roger; Gupta, Sudhir; Paul, William E. (eds.), Mechanisms of Lymphocyte Activation and Immune Regulation V - Molecular Basis of Signal Transduction, Springer, p. 91, ISBN 978-1489909879

=== Scientific journal articles ===
- Gardner, Phyllis (1987), "Ion channels activated by inositol 1,4,5-trisphosphate in plasma membrane of human T-lymphocytes", Nature, 326 (6110): 301–304, Bibcode:1987Natur.326..301K, doi:10.1038/326301a0, PMID 2434867, S2CID 4355950
- Young, W; Chen, J; Jung, F; Gardner, Phyllis (1988), "Dihydropyridine Bay K 8644 activates T lymphocyte calcium-permeable channels", Molecular Pharmacology, 34 (3): 239–44, PMID 2458520
- Chen, Jennifer; Schulman, Howard; Gardner, Phyllis (1989), "A cAMP-Regulated Chloride Channel in Lymphocytes That Is Affected in Cystic Fibrosis", Science, 243 (4891): 657–60, Bibcode:1989Sci...243..657C, doi:10.1126/science.2464852, PMID 2464852
- Gardner, Phyllis (1989), "Ca2+ and T lymphocyte activation", Cell, 59: 15–20, doi:10.1016/0092-8674(89)90865-9, PMID 2676193
- Gardner, Phyllis; Schulman, Howard (1989), "Response: Is Regulation of a Chloride Channel in Lymphocytes Affected in Cystic Fibrosis?", Science, 246 (4933): 1049–1050, doi:10.1126/science.246.4933.1049.b
- Gardner, Phyllis (1990), "Patch Clamp Studies of Lymphocyte Activation", Annual Review of Immunology, 8: 231–52, doi:10.1146/annurev.iy.08.040190.001311, PMID 1693081
- Gardner, Phyllis; Mcdonald, Thomas; Nishimoto, Ikuo; Wagner, John; Schumann, Muhammad; Chen, Jennifer; Schulman, Howard (1991), "Regulation of Lymphocyte Chloride Channels", The Identification of the CF (Cystic Fibrosis) Gene, Advances in Experimental Medicine and Biology, vol. 290, pp. 319–26, doi:10.1007/978-1-4684-5934-0_30, ISBN 978-1-4684-5936-4, PMID 1719768
- Maldonado, D.; Schumann, M.; Nghiem, P.; Dong, Y.; Gardner, P. (1991), "Prostaglandin E1 activates a chloride current in Jurkat T lymphocytes via cAMP-dependent protein kinase", FASEB Journal, 5 (14): 2965–2970
- Premack, B. A.; Gardner, P. (1991), "Role of ion channels in lymphocytes", Journal of Clinical Immunology, 11 (5): 225–238
- Wagner, J. A.; Cozens, A. L.; Schulman, H.; Gruenert, D. C.; Stryer, L.; Gardner, P. (1991), "Activation of chloride channels in normal and cystic-fibrosis airway epithelial cells", Nature, 349 (6312): 793–796
- Wagner, John; Cozens, Alison; Schulman, Howard; Gruenert, Dieter; Stryer, Lubert; Gardner, Phyllis (1991), "Activation of chloride channels in normal and cystic fibrosis airway epithelia cells by multifunctional calcium/calmodulin-dependent protein kinase", Nature, 349 (6312): 793–6, Bibcode:1991Natur.349..793W, doi:10.1038/349793a0, PMID 1705665
- Nishimoto, Ikuo; Wagner, John; Schulman, Howard; Gardner, Phyllis (1991), "Regulation of CI− channels by multifunctional CaM kinase", Neuron, 6 (4): 547–55, doi:10.1016/0896-6273(91)90057-7, PMID 1849722
- Premack, B. A.; Gardner, P. (1992), "Signal transduction by T-cell receptors – mobilization of Ca and regulation of Ca-dependent effector molecules", American Journal of Physiology, 263 (6): C1119–C1140
- Wagner, J. A.; McDonald, T. V.; Nghiem, P. T.; Lowe, A. W.; Schulman, H.; Gruenert, D. C.; Stryer, L.; Gardner, P. (1992), "Antisense oligodeoxynucleotides to the cystic fibrosis transmembrane conductance regulator inhibit cAMP-activated chloride currents", Proceedings of the National Academy of Sciences of the United States of America, 89 (15): 6785–6789
- McDonald, T. V.; Nghiem, P. T.; Gardner, P.; Martens, C. L. (1992), "Human lymphocytes transcribe the cystic fibrosis transmembrane conductance regulator gene", Journal of Biological Chemistry, 267 (5): 3242–3248
- Sudduth-Klinger, Julie; Schumann, Muhammad; Gardner, Phyllis; Payan, Donald (1992), "Functional and immunological responses of Jurkat lymphocytes transfected with the substance P receptor", Cellular and Molecular Neurobiology, 12 (5): 379–95, doi:10.1007/BF00711540, PMC 11567415, PMID 1281754
- Premack, B. A.; McDonald, T. V.; Gardner, P. (1994), "Activation of Ca2+ current in Jurkat T-cells following the depletion of Ca2+ stores", Journal of Immunology, 152 (11): 5226–5240
- Chao, A. C.; de Sauvage, F. J.; Dong, Y. J.; Wagner, J. A.; Goeddel, D. V.; Gardner, P. (1994), "Activation of intestinal CFTR Cl− channel by heat-stable enterotoxin and guanylin", EMBO Journal, 13 (5): 1065–1072
- Chao, Anthony; Zifferblatt, Jonathan; Wagner, John; Dong, Y; Gruenert, Dieter; Gardner, Phyllis (1994), "Stimulation of chloride secretion by P1 purinoceptor agonist in cystic fibrosis phenotype airway epithelial cell line CFPEo-", British Journal of Pharmacology, 112 (1): 169–75, doi:10.1111/j.1476-5381.1994.tb13047.x, PMC 1910328, PMID 8032638
- Dong, Y. J.; Chen, G.; Duran, G. E.; Kouyama, K.; Chao, A. C.; Sikic, B. I.; Gollapudi, S. V.; Gupta, S.; Gardner, P. (1994), "Volume-activated chloride current is not related to P-glycoprotein overexpression", Cancer Research, 54 (19): 5029–5032
- Nghiem, Paul; Ollick, Tracey; Gardner, Phyllis; Schulman, Howard (1994), "Interleukin-2 transcriptional block by multifunctional Ca2+/calmodulin kinase", Nature, 371 (6495): 347–50, doi:10.1038/371347a0, PMID 8090206
- Chung, S.; Mcdonald, Thomas; Gardner, Phyllis (1994), "Inhibition by SK&F 96365 of Ca2+ current, IL-2 production and activation in T lymphocytes", British Journal of Pharmacology, 113 (3): 861–8, doi:10.1111/j.1476-5381.1994.tb17072.x, PMC 1510420, PMID 7858878
- Gardner, Phyllis (1995). "Activation of dual T cell signaling pathways by the chemokine Rantes". Science. 269 (5231): 1727–1730. Bibcode:1995Sci...269.1727B. doi:10.1126/science.7569902. PMID 7569902.
- Cao, W.W.; Kao, P.N.; Chao, A.C.; Gardner, P.; Ng, J.; Morris, R.E. (1995), "Mechanism of the antiproliferative action of leflunomide – A77 1726, the active metabolite of leflunomide, does not block T-cell receptor-mediated signal transduction but its antiproliferative effects are antagonized by pyrimidine nucleosides", Journal of Heart and Lung Transplantation, 14 (6): 1016–1030
- Chao, A.C.; Kouyama, K.; Heist, E.K.; Dong, Y.J.; Gardner, P. (1995), "Calcium-dependent and CaMKII-dependent chloride secretion induced by the microsomal Ca²⁺-ATPase inhibitor 2,5-di-(tert-butyl)-1,4-hydroquinone in cystic-fibrosis pancreatic epithelial cells", Journal of Clinical Investigation, 96 (4): 1794–1801
- Dong, Y.J.; Chao, A.C.; Kouyama, K.; Hsu, Y.P.; Bocian, R.C.; Moss, R.B.; Gardner, P. (1995), "Activation of CFTR chloride current by nitric-oxide in human T-lymphocytes", EMBO Journal, 14 (12): 2700–2707
- Moss, R. B.; Bocian, R. C.; Hsu, Y. P.; Dong, Y. J.; Kemna, M.; Wei, T.; Gardner, P. (1996), "Reduced IL-10 secretion by CD4(+) T lymphocytes expressing mutant CFTR", Clinical and Experimental Immunology, 106 (2): 374–388
- Gardner, Phyllis (March 28, 1997), "Nuclear Export of NF-ATc Enhanced by Glycogen Synthase Kinase-3", Science, 275 (5308): 1930–1933, doi:10.1126/science.275.5308.1930, PMID 9072970, S2CID 22590899
- Mathias, Robert; Zhang, Shuanghin; Wilson, Emily; Gardner, Phyllis; Ives, Harlan (1997), "Non-capacitative Calcium Entry in Chinese Hamster Ovary Cells Expressing the Platelet-derived Growth Factor Receptor", The Journal of Biological Chemistry, 272 (46): 29076–82, doi:10.1074/jbc.272.46.29076, PMID 9360982
- Wagner, J. A.; Gardner, P. (1997), "Toward cystic fibrosis gene therapy", Annual Review of Medicine, 48: 203–216
- Wainwright, P. K.; Alicke, B.; Kovesdi, I.; Wickham, T. J.; Smith, J. G.; Meier-Davis, S.; Daddona, J. A.; Gardner, P.; Huang, M. T. (1998), "Adenovirus-mediated transduction of intestinal cells in vivo", Human Gene Therapy, 9 (9): 1313–1321
- Wagner, John; Moran, Mary; Messner, Anna; Daifuku, Richard; Conrad, Carol; Phd, Thomas; Guggino, William; Moss, Richard; Carter, Barrie; Wine, Jeffrey; Flotte, Terence; Gardner, Phyllis (1998), "A Phase I/II Study of tgAAV-CF for the Treatment of Chronic Sinusitis in Patients with Cystic Fibrosis. Stanford University, Stanford, California", Human Gene Therapy, 9 (6): 889–909, doi:10.1089/hum.1998.9.6-889, PMID 9581911
- Wagner, John; Reynolds, Thomas; Moran, Mary; Moss, Richard; Wine, Jeffrey; Flotte, Terence; Gardner, Phyllis (1998), "Efficient and persistent gene transfer of AAV-CFTR in maxillary sinus", The Lancet, 351 (9117): 1702–3, doi:10.1016/S0140-6736(05)77740-0, PMID 9734891
- Wagner, John; Nepomuceno, Ilynn; Shah, Niraj; Messner, Anna; Moran, Mary; Norbash, Alexander; Moss, Richard; Wine, Jeffrey; Gardner, Phyllis (1999), "Maxillary Sinusitis as a Surrogate Model for CF Gene Therapy Clinical Trials in Patients with Antrostomies", The Journal of Gene Medicine, 1: 13–21, doi:10.1002/(SICI)1521-2254(199901/02)1:1<13::AID-JGM6>3.0.CO;2-G
- Wagner, John; Nepomuceno, Ilynn; Messner, Anna; Moran, Mary; Batson, Eric; Dimiceli, Sue; Brown, Byron; Desch, Julie; Norbash, Alexander; Conrad, Carol; Guggino, William; Flotte, Terence; Wine, Jeffrey; Carter, Barrie; Reynolds, Thomas; Moss, Richard; Gardner, Phyllis (2002), "A Phase II, Double-Blind, Randomized, Placebo-Controlled Clinical Trial of tgAAVCF Using Maxillary Sinus Delivery in Patients with Cystic Fibrosis with Antrostomies", Human Gene Therapy, 13 (11): 1349–59, doi:10.1089/104303402760128577, PMID 12162817
- Sheridan, Colleen; Heist, E; Beals, Chan; Crabtree, Gerald; Gardner, Phyllis (2003), "Protein Kinase A Negatively Modulates the Nuclear Accumulation of NF-ATc1 by Priming for Subsequent Phosphorylation by Glycogen Synthase Kinase-3", The Journal of Biological Chemistry, 277 (50): 48664–76, doi:10.1074/jbc.M207029200, PMID 12351631
- Schrijver, Iris; Karnsakul, Wikrom; Limwongse, Chanin; Ramalingam, Sudha; Sankaran, Ramalingam; Gardner, Phyllis; Moss, Richard (2005), "Novel contributions to the Asian CFTR mutation spectrum: Genotype and phenotype in Thai patients with cystic fibrosis", American Journal of Medical Genetics, 133A (1): 103–5, doi:10.1002/ajmg.a.30472, PMID 15744829
- Schrijver, Iris; Ramalingam, Sudha; Sankaran, Ramalingam; Swanson, Steve; Dunlop, Charles; Keiles, Steven; Moss, Richard; Oehlert, John; Gardner, Phyllis; Wassman, E; Kammesheidt, Anja (2005), "Diagnostic testing by CFTR gene mutation analysis in a large group hispanics: Novel mutations and assessment of a population-specific mutation spectrum", The Journal of Molecular Diagnostics, 7 (2): 289–99, doi:10.1016/S1525-1578(10)60557-0, PMC 1867528, PMID 15858154
- Schrijver, Iris; Oitmaa, Eneli; Gardner, Phyllis (2005), "Genotyping Microarray for the Detection of More Than 200 CFTR Mutations in Ethnically Diverse Populations", The Journal of Molecular Diagnostics, 7 (3): 375–87, doi:10.1016/S1525-1578(10)60567-3, PMC 1867536, PMID 16049310
- Schrijver, Iris; Gardner, Phyllis (2006), "Hereditary sensorineural hearing loss: Advances in molecular genetics and mutation analysis", Expert Review of Molecular Diagnostics, 6 (3): 375–86, doi:10.1586/14737159.6.3.375, PMID 16706740
- Gardner, Phyllis (2006), "Microfabricated nanochannel implantable drug delivery devices: Trends, limitations and possibilities", Expert Opinion on Drug Delivery, 3 (4): 479–87, doi:10.1517/17425247.3.4.479, PMID 16822223
- Gardner, Phyllis; Oitmaa, Eneli; Messner, Anna; Hoefsloot, Lies; Schrijver, Iris (2006), "Simultaneous Multigene Mutation Detection in Patients With Sensorineural Hearing Loss Through a Novel Diagnostic Microarray: A New Approach for Newborn Screening Follow-up", Pediatrics, 118 (3): 985–94, doi:10.1542/peds.2005-2519, PMID 16950989
- Naguib, Maggie; Schrijver, Iris; Gardner, Phyllis; Pique, Lynn; Doss, Samiha; Abu-Zekry, Mona; Aziz, Mona; Nasr, Samya (2007), "Cystic fibrosis detection in high-risk Egyptian children and CFTR mutation analysis", Journal of Cystic Fibrosis, 6 (2), European Cystic Fibrosis Society: 111–6, doi:10.1016/j.jcf.2006.04.004, PMID 16837250
- Naguib, Maggie; Schrijver, I.; Gardner, Phyllis; Piquet, L.; Doss, S.; Abu-Zekry, Mona; Aziz, M.; Nasré, S. (2006), "472 Incidence of Cystic Fibrosis in high-risk Egyptian children and CFTR mutation analysis", Journal of Cystic Fibrosis, 5: S103, doi:10.1016/S1569-1993(06)80396-6
- Nghiem, P.; Saati, S. M.; Martens, C. L.; Gardner, P.; Schulman, H. (1993), "Cloning and analysis of two new isoforms of multifunctional Ca2+/calmodulin-dependent protein kinase", Journal of Biological Chemistry, 268 (8): 5471–5479
- McDonald, T. V.; Premack, B. A.; Gardner, P. (1993), "Flash-photolysis of caged inositol 1,4,5-trisphosphate activates plasma-membrane calcium current in human T-cells", Journal of Biological Chemistry, 268 (6): 3889–3896
- Schumann, M. A.; Gardner, P.; Raffin, T. A. (1993), "Recombinant human tumor-necrosis-factor-alpha induces calcium oscillation and calcium-activated chloride current in human neutrophils", Journal of Biological Chemistry, 268 (3): 2134–2140
- Schrijver, Iris; Külm, Maigi; Gardner, Phyllis; Pergament, Eugene; Fiddler, Morris (2007), "Comprehensive Arrayed Primer Extension Array for the Detection of 59 Sequence Variants in 15 Conditions Prevalent Among the (Ashkenazi) Jewish Population", The Journal of Molecular Diagnostics, 9 (2): 228–36, doi:10.2353/jmoldx.2007.060100, PMC 1867437, PMID 17384215
- Rodriguez-Paris, Juan; Ballay, Charles; Inserra, Michelle; Stidham, Katrina; Colen, Tahl; Roberson, Joseph; Gardner, Phyllis; Schrijver, Iris (2008), "Genetic Analysis of Presbycusis by Arrayed Primer Extension", Annals of Clinical and Laboratory Science, 38 (4): 352–60, PMID 18988928
- Teek, Rita; Oitmaa, Eneli; Kruustük, Katrin; Zordania, Riina; Joost, Kairit; Raukas, Elve; Tõnisson, Neeme; Gardner, Phyllis; Schrijver, Iris; Kull, Mart; Ounap, Katrin (2008), "Splice variant IVS2-2A>G in the SLC26A5 (Prestin) gene in five Estonian families with hearing loss", International Journal of Pediatric Otorhinolaryngology, 73 (1): 103–7, doi:10.1016/j.ijporl.2008.10.003, PMID 19027966
- Qu, Chunyan; Gardner, Phyllis; Schrijver, Iris (2009), "The role of the cytoskeleton in the formation of gap junctions by Connexin 30", Experimental Cell Research, 315 (10): 1683–92, doi:10.1016/j.yexcr.2009.03.001, PMID 19285977
- Rodriguez-Paris, Juan; Pique, Lynn; Colen, Tahl; Roberson, Joseph; Gardner, Phyllis; Schrijver, Iris (2010), "Genotyping with a 198 Mutation Arrayed Primer Extension Array for Hereditary Hearing Loss: Assessment of Its Diagnostic Value for Medical Practice", PLOS One, 5 (7) e11804, Bibcode:2010PLoSO...511804R, doi:10.1371/journal.pone.0011804, PMC 2909915, PMID 20668687
- Traynis, Ilana; Bernstein, Jonathan; Gardner, Phyllis; Schrijver, Iris (2011), "Analysis of the Alternative Splicing of an FGFR2 Transcript Due to a Novel 5 ' Splice Site Mutation (1084+1G > A): Case Report", The Cleft Palate-Craniofacial Journal, 49 (1), American Cleft Palate-Craniofacial Association: 104–8, doi:10.1597/10-217, PMID 21524234

=== Academic conferences ===
- Premack, B.A.; Gardner, Phyllis (1994), "Properties of Ca Currents Activated by T Cell Receptor Signaling", 5th International Conference on Mechanisms of Lymphocyte Activation and Immune Regulation, Advances in Experimental Medicine and Biology, vol. 365, Plenum Press, pp. 91–102, doi:10.1007/978-1-4899-0987-9_10, ISBN 978-1-4899-0989-3, PMID 7887318
- Wagner, J A; Messner, A H; Moran, M L; Daifuku, R; Kouyama, K; Desch, J K; Manley, S; Norbash, A M; Conrad, C K; Friborg, S; Reynolds, T; Guggino, W B; Moss, R B; Carter, B J; Wine, J J; Flotte, T R; Gardner, Phyllis (1999), "Safety and biological efficacy of an adeno-associated virus vector cystic fibrosis transmembrane regulator (AAV-CFTR) in the cystic fibrosis maxillary sinus", 11th Annual North American Cystic Fibrosis Conference, vol. 109, no. 2, John Wiley & Sons Inc., pp. 266–74, doi:10.1097/00005537-199902000-00017, PMID 10890777
- Gardner, Phyllis (2005), "Microfabricated silicon NanoPORE membranes provide continuous delivery of biopharmaceuticals", International Conference on MEMS, NANO and Smart Systems, vol. 179, IEEE, p. 179, doi:10.1109/ICMENS.2005.70, ISBN 0-7695-2398-6
