= Ian Gibbons (biochemist) =

British biochemist (1946-2013)

- Born: March 6, 1946; Runcorn, England, UK
- Died: May 23, 2013 (aged 67); Portola Valley, California, U.S.
- Cause of death: Suicide by overdose of acetaminophen
- Education: University of Cambridge (PhD)
- Spouse: Rochelle Gibbons

Ian Gibbons (March 6, 1946 – May 23, 2013) was a British biochemist and molecular biology researcher who served as the chief scientist of the American company Theranos, which was founded by Elizabeth Holmes. He had a Ph.D. in biochemistry from the University of Cambridge, and was a postdoctoral researcher at the University of California, Berkeley. For more than 30 years, Gibbons performed research in medical therapeutics and diagnostic testing prior to joining Theranos in 2005.

Gibbons attempted to raise issues with Holmes, and Theranos' management, about the inaccuracy of their testing devices — to no avail. In 2013, Gibbons intentionally overdosed on acetaminophen the night before he was scheduled to be deposed in a lawsuit related to Theranos. He was hospitalized for several days and died from liver failure. Theranos collapsed in 2018 after journalist John Carreyrou revealed in The Wall Street Journal that its supposedly revolutionary blood testing devices, requiring only a fingerstick of blood, had never functioned as claimed. Gibbons had attempted to inform his superiors at Theranos, including Holmes, of the failure of their technology but the company's executives repeatedly ignored his objections.

Gibbons' career at Theranos is documented in Carreyrou's book Bad Blood: Secrets and Lies in a Silicon Valley Startup, and in the second episode of the ABC News podcast The Dropout. British actor Stephen Fry portrayed Gibbons in the biographical drama miniseries The Dropout, which is based on the podcast.

== Early life and family ==
Ian Gibbons was born and raised in England. His father served in the British Armed Forces, and during World War II he was held captive in North Africa, and was held in prisoner of war camps in Italy and Poland before being liberated. Ian Gibbons earned a Ph.D. in biochemistry from the University of Cambridge. After obtaining his Ph.D., he moved to the United States and completed a postdoctoral fellowship in the department of molecular biology of the University of California, Berkeley. Gibbons met his wife Rochelle while they were both studying microbiology at Berkeley in 1973, and they married in 1975. Rochelle was educated as a scientist and patent lawyer, and has worked in immigration law.

== Career ==
=== Biotech research ===
For 30 years, Ian Gibbons worked on diagnostic and therapeutic products at technology companies. In the 1980s, he worked at a biotechnology firm called Syva Company, where he produced groundbreaking research on immunoassays. During his career, Gibbons was named on almost 200 patents. While working at Biotrack Laboratories, he developed blood assay technologies and held 19 patents for the scientific techniques he created. At Biotrack, Gibbons worked with Channing Robertson, who later recommended him as the first experienced scientist to be hired by Theranos. At Biotrack, Gibbons, Robertson, and others invented and patented a mechanism to dilute and mix liquid samples, abilities that would become key in Theranos' processes.

=== Theranos ===
Gibbons' former colleague Channing Robertson recruited him to work for Theranos as chief scientist in 2005.

In 2005, Theranos CEO Elizabeth Holmes hired Ian Gibbons as the company's chief scientist. Gibbons was the first experienced scientist hired by the company, with the title of Senior Director of Assay Development. He initially served as the company's lab director and as director of product development. In 2007, Gibbons was diagnosed with colon cancer. He underwent cancer treatments including chemotherapy and multiple surgeries, and was absent for some time from Theranos during his recovery.

For the company, Ian Gibbons authored 23 patents on which other Theranos researchers are also named. Holmes' name appears on 19 patents related to Theranos which were authored by Gibbons. He worked on blood chemistry with Gary Frenzel between 2005 and 2010, when Gibbons led the division. As chief scientist, Gibbons often gave the staff informal lectures on biochemistry and the science of blood testing. To ensure product success, Gibbons insisted blood-test results from Theranos developmental devices needed to match benchmark results of competitors' commercial analyzers.

Theranos' devices often became a source of frustration for Gibbons because they differed, sometimes significantly, from the benchmarks. His high standards became a source of disagreements with Theranos engineers and senior management. Senior management reprimanded employees who questioned the accuracy of the technology. As a result of his desperation, Gibbons told his wife Rochelle "nothing at Theranos is working". Holmes's practice of discouraging communication between departments also troubled Gibbons. The reason given for such information siloing was that the company was operating in stealth mode to protect its trade secrets. The siloing, however, prevented effective problem solving and pursuit of common goals between employees.

Gibbons knew of Holmes's falsehoods to employees and outsiders about Theranos' technology and readiness, as well as false demonstrations to clients; and he no longer trusted Holmes. He continued, however, to struggle to make the flawed Theranos technology meet the company's expectations. After being demoted, Gibbons continued working with Paul Patel, his successor at Theranos. Gibbons attempted to fix the technology to match the grandiose claims made by Holmes and Theranos staff but his efforts were unsuccessful. When Gibbons attempted to alert Theranos executives the technology did not work, his colleagues bullied and humiliated Gibbons for trying to speak out. In 2006, Gibbons told Holmes the blood testing Theranos had developed was not yet fit for use by members of the public, and that their proprietary technology was not accurate.

In late 2010, Gibbons told his friend and trusted colleague Channing Robertson about his concerns about misrepresentations made by Theranos about the effectiveness of its technology. Robertson alerted Holmes of Gibbons' complaints and frustrations, and Gibbons was dismissed from the company. Several of Gibbons' colleagues lobbied on his behalf, and he was quickly rehired with reduced responsibilities as a technical consultant to the chemistry group he had formerly headed.

==== Patent lawsuit ====
In 2011, Ian Gibbons became involved in a patent theft case involving Theranos and Richard Fuisz, an American entrepreneur and inventor who had been a former friend and neighbour of Elizabeth Holmes and her family. The two families had fallen out and Holmes had declined Fuisz's offer to help Holmes with her invention.

After Fuisz studied publicly available patent information about Theranos' technology, he filed his own patent for a physician-alert mechanism that could be embedded in a testing device, which he identified was not covered by any Theranos patents. Without owning this patent, Theranos would have needed a license from Fuisz's patent to cover physician/patient alerts – a desirable feature in a medical analyzer. When Theranos discovered Fuisz had filed his patent, it responded by filing a lawsuit for patent theft alleging Fuisz had misused Theranos' existing patent technology.

While researching his defence to the Theranos' lawsuit, Fuisz noted Gibbons was often named as co-inventor with Holmes on many of Theranos' patents. He also noted there were similarities between Gibbons' Theranos patents and those he had filed while working for a previous employer, Biotrack. In response, Fuisz added Gibbons' name to his list of witnesses to be deposed to answer questions about improper reuse of past work and the identification of Holmes as a co-inventor.

Gibbons became nervous and depressed when he learnt he would be subpoenaed to testify. He wanted to avoid being deposed because he was afraid his job depended on his testimony. Rochelle Gibbons assessed his state of mind towards the end of his time at Theranos: "It was hell for him to work there. It was complete hell. I think that he was very confused about why he was being treated so badly." She said Ian felt humiliated to be associated with the company's scientific failures. He felt pressured by Theranos to lie about the state of the company's research. Rochelle believed if he told the truth, he would lose his job, and have limited future job prospects due to his age. Ian felt he was in a no-win scenario; by not speaking out, he thought, he would be hurting the general populace, but if he agreed to speak the truth, he would hurt his colleagues.

== Death and Theranos response ==
On May 15, 2013, Ian Gibbons was notified that he needed to appear at the Fuisz lawyers' offices on May 17 to give his deposition. A lawyer for Theranos, who had been actively discouraging him from testifying, emailed Gibbons a draft doctor's note that could be adapted to excuse him. On the evening of May 16, Gibbons ingested a combination of wine and acetaminophen. The following morning, Rochelle Gibbons discovered him on their bathroom floor, unconscious and barely breathing. He died, aged 67, of liver failure in a hospital on May 23, 2013.

When Rochelle Gibbons called Holmes' office to report his death, Holmes did not return her call. Gibbons' wife, however, received an email from a Theranos lawyer requesting she immediately return Gibbons' company laptop and any confidential information he might have had in his possession. Holmes sent an internal company email to several colleagues informing them of Gibbons' death and that a memorial service would be held; no memorial service, however, was organized by Holmes or her company.

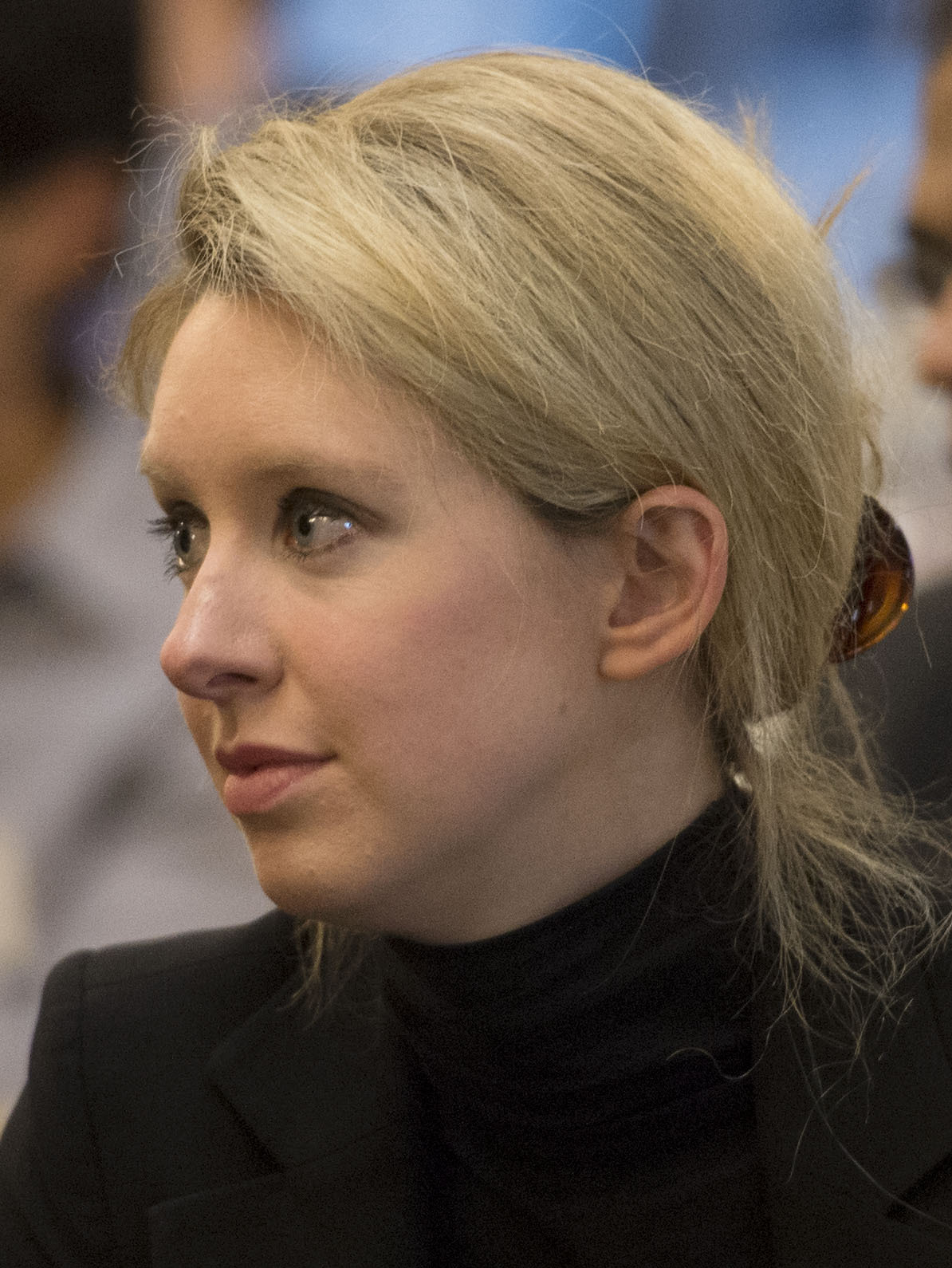
After Gibbons's death, lawyers for Theranos threatened his widow — and Elizabeth Holmes (pictured) and her partner Sunny Balwani texted about filing a lawsuit against her.

Attorneys representing Theranos sent Rochelle Gibbons a letter saying legal action against her would ensue if she spoke to a journalist about the company. After she spoke with a journalist, she received a letter from the law firm representing Theranos, Boies Schiller Flexner LLP, signed by attorney Mike Brille. The letter stated: "It has been the Company's desire not to pursue legal action against Mrs. Gibbons. Unless she immediately ceases these actions, she will leave the Company no other option but to pursue litigation to definitively put an end [to] these actions once and for all."

In 2015, The Wall Street Journal published a Theranos exposé by John Carreyrou, after which, Elizabeth Holmes and her partner Sunny Balwani sent text messages to each other about filing a lawsuit against Rochelle Gibbons. Rochelle Gibbons said of these legal threats from Holmes' attorney David Boies and his law firm: "[It] was absurd that is that they could think that they could sue me for talking about Ian. You know they couldn't. I guess they were trying to scare me, to intimidate me into thinking they're going to get me for defamation. But the defense to defamation is truth and so you know I'm telling the truth here, not lying about Theranos."

Although Ian Gibbons had worked for Theranos for 10 years, after his death, Rochelle Gibbons never received any condolences from the company, from Balwani, or from Holmes. By 2021, Elizabeth Holmes had never contacted Rochelle Gibbons. Gibbons publicly blamed Holmes for her husband's death, and believed he would not have killed himself if he had not gone to work for Theranos. Gibbons said Holmes "has shown no remorse for any of the things she's done to anyone, nothing".

== In media ==
Beginning in 2015, The Wall Street Journal reporter John Carreyrou exposed the practices of Theranos and Elizabeth Holmes in a series of articles; this was followed by US federal government investigations that led to the company's collapse in 2018. Carreyrou devoted chapter 12 of his book, Bad Blood: Secrets and Lies in a Silicon Valley Startup to Ian Gibbons. Carreyrou described how he met with Rochelle Gibbons, who agreed to be a source for his book, in California, two years after Ian Gibbons' death. Carreyrou said the interview process was difficult for Gibbons; he said she was still grieving, that she blamed Theranos for his death, and that she "wished he had never worked there".

Ian Gibbons's career, his time at Theranos, and his death were featured in the second episode of the ABC News podcast The Dropout, which was hosted by Rebecca Jarvis. In the 2019 podcast episode titled "The Enforcer", Jarvis interviews Rochelle Gibbons, who had also talked with the Federal Bureau of Investigation for United States v. Elizabeth A. Holmes, et al. In the American biographical television drama miniseries created by The Dropout, based on the podcast, Gibbons was portrayed by actor Stephen Fry. In his research for the role, Fry asked show creator Elizabeth Meriwether if contacting Rochelle Gibbons would be acceptable. Gibbons spoke with Fry at length about her husband, and educated Fry about his character. Prior to being cast in the series, Fry had listened to the entirety of the podcast. Fry viewed the Theranos scandal including Gibbons's suicide as a tragedy of "epic Shakespearean greed".

Ian Gibbons' role in attempting to bring to light the inaccurate nature of Theranos testing machines was highlighted in a 2022 article on ethics in scientific research for the journal Science and Engineering Ethics. Stanford University management professor Robert E. McGinn emphasized the roles of Theranos scientists who unsuccessfully tried to respond admirably to the ethical challenges presented by the company's management. McGinn said Gibbons' "efforts to prevent unreasonable risks of harm were admirably ethically responsible". In a 2022 article for the journal Frontiers in Sociology, University of South Florida professors Lily M. Abadal and Garrett W. Potts called the management culture at Theranos a form of "chronic moral injury" (CH-MI). The professors concluded; "the recent management scandal at Theranos ... perpetuated CH-MI, ultimately leading to Gibbons's untimely death".

== Bibliography ==
=== Book chapters ===
- Edwin F. Ullman; I. Gibbons; D. Litman (January 1983), "Homogeneous Immunoassays and Immunometric Assays Employing Enzyme Channeling.", in John H. Rippey and Robert M. Nakamura (ed.), Diagnostic Immunology: Technology Assessment and Quality Assurance, College of American Pathologists, pp. 31–46
- Ian Gibbons (January 1985), "Nonseparation Enzyme Immunoassays for Macromolecules", Enzyme-Mediated Immunoassay, Springer, pp. 121–143, doi:10.1007/978-1-4684-5012-5_8, ISBN 978-1-4684-5014-9
- Ian Gibbons; Robert K. DiNello; Roger R. Greenburg; John Olson; Edwin F. Ullman (1985), "Sensitive Homogenous Enzyme Immunoassays for Microbial Antigens", Rapid Detection and Identification of Infectious Agents, Academic Press, pp. 155–163, doi:10.1016/B978-0-12-408550-3.50014-3, ISBN 9780124085503
- Ian Gibbons; Richard Armenta; Robert K. DiNello; Edwin F. Ullman (1987), "Nonseparation enzyme channeling immunometric assays", Immobilized Enzymes and Cells, Part C, Methods in Enzymology, vol. 136, Academic Press, pp. 93–103, doi:10.1016/S0076-6879(87)36011-2, ISBN 9780121820367, ISSN 0076-6879, PMID 3316931
- Travis D. Boone; Antonio J. Ricco; Philip Gooding; Torleif O. Björnson; Sharat Singh; Vivian Xiao; Ian Gibbons; Stephen J. Williams; Hongdong Tan (2000), "Sub-Microliter Assays and DNA Analysis on Plastic Microfluidics", Micro Total Analysis Systems 2000, Springer, pp. 541–544, doi:10.1007/978-94-017-2264-3_127, ISBN 978-90-481-5496-8
- Travis D. Boone; Z. Hugh Fan; Ian Gibbons; Antonio J. Ricco; Alexander Sassi; Sharat Singh; Dennis Slomski; Hongdong Tan; Stephen J. Williams; Vivian Xiao; Qifeng Xue (2001), "Disposable Plastic Microfluidic Arrays for Applications in Biotechnology", Transducers '01 Eurosensors XV, Springer, pp. 1118–1121, doi:10.1007/978-3-642-59497-7_264, ISBN 978-3-540-42150-4

=== Journal articles ===
- Ian Gibbons, Carl Skold, Gerald L. Rowley, Edwin F. Ullman (February 1980), "Homogeneous enzyme immunoassay for proteins employing β-galactosidase", Analytical Biochemistry, 102 (1): 167–170, doi:10.1016/0003-2697(80)90334-6, OCLC 01481077, PMID 6766686 — while employed at Syva Research Institute, Palo Alto, California.
- I Gibbons, T M Hanlon, C N Skold, M E Russell, E F Ullman (1 September 1981), "Enzyme-enhancement immunoassay: A homogeneous assay for polyvalent ligands and antibodies", Clinical Chemistry, 27 (9): 1602–1608, doi:10.1093/clinchem/27.9.1602, PMID 6790197
- Ian Gibbons, Gerald L Rowley, Edwin F Ullman (1985), "Charge effects in enzyme immunoassays", Biotechnology Advances, 3 (1): 126–127, doi:10.1016/0734-9750(85)90188-0
- Richard Armenta, Thomas Tarnowski, Ian Gibbons, Edwin F. Ullman (April 1985), "Improved sensitivity in homogeneous enzyme immunoassays using a fluorogenic macromolecular substrate: An assay for serum ferritin", Analytical Biochemistry, 146 (1), Elsevier: 211–219, doi:10.1016/0003-2697(85)90418-X, PMID 3922243 — authored while employed at Syva Research Institute, Palo Alto, CA.
- Carl N. Skold, Ian Gibbons, Mary E. Russell, Eusebio Juaristi, Gerald L. Rowley, Edwin F. Ullman (18 July 1985), "Action of β-galactosidase on novel synthetic macromolecular substrates. A processive enzymic reaction controlled by coulombic interactions", Biochimica et Biophysica Acta (BBA) - Protein Structure and Molecular Enzymology, 830 (1): 64–70, doi:10.1016/0167-4838(85)90132-3, PMID 2410029 — authored while employed at Syva Research Institute, Palo Alto, CA.
- Richar Armenta, Ian Gibbons, John Olson (1987), "Reducing background interference activity in enzyme-label immunoassays", Biotechnology Advances, 5 (2): 357, doi:10.1016/0734-9750(87)90576-3
- C Skold; I Gibbons; D Gould; E F Ullman (15 May 1987), "Monoclonal antibodies to glucose-6-phosphate dehydrogenase (G6PDH) form cyclic 1:1 complexes with G6PDH and act as regulatory subunits.", The Journal of Immunology, 138 (10): 3408–3414, doi:10.4049/jimmunol.138.10.3408, PMID 2437192, S2CID 24513658
- E F Ullman, T Tarnowski, P Felgner, I Gibbons (1 September 1987), "Use of liposome encapsulation in a combined single-liquid reagent for homogeneous enzyme immunoassay", Clinical Chemistry, 33 (9): 1579–1584, doi:10.1093/clinchem/33.9.1579, PMID 3304713
- Litai Weng, Ian Gibbons, Edwin Ullman (January 1987), "Homogeneous enzyme specific binding assay on non-porous surface", Biotechnology Advances, 5 (1), Elsevier: 159, doi:10.1016/0734-9750(87)90066-8, OCLC 08838531
- E Eisenstein, M.S. Han, T.S. Woo, J.M. Ritchey, I Gibbons, Y.R. Yang, H.K. Schachman (15 November 1992), "Negative complementation in aspartate transcarbamylase. Analysis of hybrid enzyme molecules containing different arrangements of polypeptide chains from wild-type and inactive mutant catalytic subunits.", Journal of Biological Chemistry, 267 (31): 22148–22155, doi:10.1016/S0021-9258(18)41647-X, OCLC 54114375, PMID 1429567 — published while Gibbons was a professor at Department of Molecular and Cell Biology, University of California, Berkeley.
- Ian Gibbons (1 June 2000), "Microfluidic arrays for high-throughput submicroliter assays using capillary electrophoresis", Drug Discovery Today, 5 (Supplement 1), Elsevier: 33–36, doi:10.1016/S1359-6446(00)01498-7
