= The Dropout =

2022 American drama television miniseries

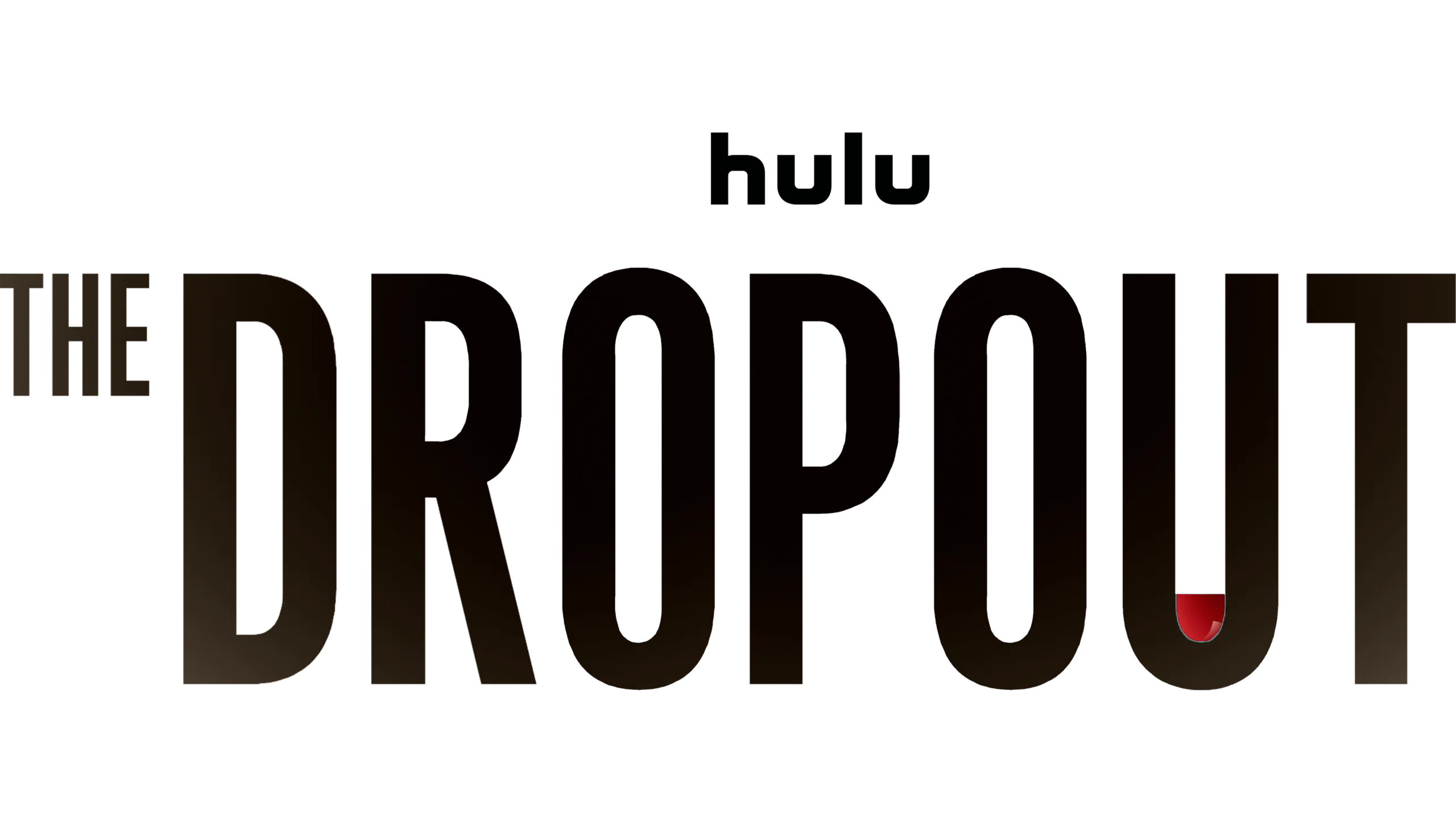
- Genre: Biographical drama; Black comedy
- Created by: Elizabeth Meriwether
- Based on: The Dropout by: Taylor Dunn; Rebecca Jarvis; Victoria Thompson
- Starring: Amanda Seyfried; Naveen Andrews
- Composer: Anne Nikitin
- Country of origin: United States
- Original language: English
- No. of episodes: 8

Production
- Executive producers: Elizabeth Meriwether; Katherine Pope; Michael Showalter; Jordana Mollick; Rebecca Jarvis; Taylor Dunn; Victoria Thompson; Liz Heldens; Liz Hannah
- Producers: Amanda Seyfried; Hilary Bettis; Megan Mascena
- Cinematography: Michelle Lawler; Jonathan Furmanski; Blake McClure
- Editors: David Berman; Steve Welch; Susana Benaim
- Running time: 45–55 minutes
- Production companies: Elizabeth Meriwether Pictures; Semi-Formal Productions; 20th Television; Searchlight Television

Original release
- Network: Hulu
- Release: March 3 – April 7, 2022

The Dropout is an American biographical drama television miniseries about the rise and fall of Elizabeth Holmes, founder of the disgraced biotechnology company Theranos; she is played by Amanda Seyfried. Created by Elizabeth Meriwether, the series is based on the ABC News podcast of the same name hosted by Rebecca Jarvis. The series features an ensemble supporting cast, including Naveen Andrews, Elizabeth Marvel, William H. Macy, Stephen Fry, Mary Lynn Rajskub, Bill Irwin, Utkarsh Ambudkar, LisaGay Hamilton, Michael Ironside, Laurie Metcalf, Anne Archer, and Sam Waterston. It is the first television project produced by Searchlight Television.

The Dropout premiered on the streaming service Hulu on March 3, 2022. It received positive reviews from critics, who praised the writing and the performances of the cast, particularly Seyfried. At the 74th Primetime Emmy Awards, the series earned six nominations, including Outstanding Limited or Anthology Series, with Seyfried winning for Outstanding Lead Actress. It was also nominated for Best Limited or Anthology Series or Television Film and Seyfried won Best Actress at the 80th Golden Globe Awards.

== Synopsis ==
The Dropout, based on the ABC Audio podcast of the same name, is a series about the rise and fall of Elizabeth Holmes and her company, Theranos. The show touches on experiences that likely motivated Holmes's deceptions, starting from her preteens and all the way to her exposure as a fraud.

== Cast and characters ==
=== Main ===
- Amanda Seyfried as Elizabeth Holmes, a Stanford University dropout who goes on to found healthcare startup Theranos
- Naveen Andrews as Sunny Balwani, Holmes' lover and Theranos' COO

=== Recurring and guest ===
- Elizabeth Marvel as Noel Holmes, Elizabeth's mother
- Michel Gill as Chris Holmes, Elizabeth's father, a former Enron employee
- William H. Macy as Richard Fuisz, the Holmes' family acquaintance with a history of healthcare patents
- Mary Lynn Rajskub as Lorraine Fuisz, Richard's wife who behaves deferentially towards Noel
- Bill Irwin as Channing Robertson, Holmes' chemical engineering professor at Stanford who becomes Theranos' first board member
- Utkarsh Ambudkar as Rakesh Madhava, a Theranos engineer and Holmes' former TA at Robertson's research group. Madhava is a fictional character.
- Laurie Metcalf as Phyllis Gardner, a physician and pharmacologist who was one of Theranos' early skeptics
- Stephen Fry as Ian Gibbons, Theranos' chief scientist
- Kate Burton as Rochelle Gibbons, Ian's supportive wife
- James Hiroyuki Liao as Edmond Ku, a Theranos engineer who becomes increasingly disgruntled with the company's practices
- Michael Ironside as Don Lucas, a venture capitalist who invested in Oracle and joins Theranos' board
- Hart Bochner as Larry Ellison, Oracle CEO
- Nicky Endres as Ana Arriola, a former Apple engineer who briefly joins Theranos' design team
- Amir Arison as Avie Tevanian, a Theranos board member who casts doubts about the company's progress
- Bashir Salahuddin as Brendan Morris, an engineer hired by Holmes to develop an altogether different prototype of the Theranos machine. Morris is a fictional character, closest to real-life Theranos employee Tony Nugent.
- Shaun J. Brown as Daniel Young, a Theranos vice president who enforces the company's culture of secrecy
- Alan Ruck as Jay "Dr. Jay" Rosan, an eccentric Walgreens executive enamored with Silicon Valley
- Josh Pais as Wade Miquelon, Walgreens CFO
- Rich Sommer as Kevin Hunter, a Walgreens-employed lab consultant who remains skeptical of Theranos
- Andrew Leeds as Roland, a Walgreens executive
- Sam Waterston as George Shultz, former United States Secretary of State and Theranos board member
- Anne Archer as Charlotte Shultz, wife of George Shultz
- Dylan Minnette as Tyler Shultz, George Shultz's grandson who interns at Theranos before becoming a whistleblower
- Kurtwood Smith as David Boies, a prominent litigator whom Holmes hires as her attorney
- Michaela Watkins as Linda Tanner, Theranos' chief in-house counsel
- Sam Straley as Christian Holmes, Elizabeth's brother who is hired as Theranos' Chief of Strategic Operations
- Kevin Sussman as Mark Roessler, Theranos' lab director who helps break the story on its fraudulent practices
- Camryn Mi-Young Kim as Erika Cheung, a young Theranos employee who becomes a company whistleblower alongside Tyler Shultz
- Ebon Moss-Bachrach as John Carreyrou, a reporter for The Wall Street Journal who exposes Theranos' fraud (and who wrote the book Bad Blood about Holmes in real life).
- LisaGay Hamilton as Judith Baker, Carreyrou's editor. The character is loosely based on Carreyrou's real-life editor at the Journal, Gerard Baker.
- Garrett Coffey as Billy Evans, a hotel heir and Holmes' new boyfriend

== Episodes ==
No.	Title	Directed by	Written by	Original release date
1	"I'm In a Hurry"	Michael Showalter	Elizabeth Meriwether	March 3, 2022
In late 2001, 17-year-old Elizabeth Holmes' father loses his job in the Enron scandal. The following summer, Elizabeth participates in a Stanford University Mandarin exchange program in Beijing, where she befriends Sunny Balwani, then a graduate student 19 years her senior. The two remain in touch once Holmes begins her studies at Stanford, where she obtains a graduate-level research position with professor Channing Robertson. Holmes, who idolizes Steve Jobs and aspires to become a billionaire inventor, files a patent for a wearable drug-delivery patch and asks Robertson to invest; Robertson connects her to professor Phyllis Gardner, who swiftly shuts down the idea. As a sophomore, Holmes is raped at a party, and cuts ties with Balwani shortly thereafter. She soon comes up with the idea for an at-home blood test that can deliver rapid results from minuscule volumes of blood, and tells her parents she plans to drop out of Stanford to turn the idea into a business. She and Balwani begin a romantic relationship.
2	"Satori"	Michael Showalter	Matt Lutsky	March 3, 2022
By 2006, Holmes' startup Theranos is fully operational, staffed largely by her former colleagues at the Stanford research group, with biochemist Ian Gibbons serving as chief scientist. Holmes unsuccessfully attempts to secure funding from various venture capitalists. Despite Theranos' prototype blood-testing device proving faulty and incomplete, Holmes eventually persuades investor Don Lucas to introduce her to Oracle CEO Larry Ellison, who asks Holmes to present Theranos' prototype to Swiss healthcare firm Novartis. When the prototype malfunctions the day before the presentation, Holmes and her colleagues unsuccessfully spend the night trying to fix it, until Holmes decides to fake the demo to Novartis by remotely sending a prior, successful test result to be read out by the device. Holmes secures $165 million in series B funding, and later admits her deceit to Balwani at an office party; Balwani tells her to keep it quiet.
3	"Green Juice"	Michael Showalter	Hilary Bettis	March 3, 2022
In 2008, Theranos continues to expand and begins building a new office. Holmes' relationship with Balwani begins to strain during this time, and his involvement in the company remains secret. Richard Fuisz, the Holmes' former family friend who has filed several healthcare patents, sues Theranos out of bitterness for not being consulted. Theranos begins seeking contracts from major pharmaceuticals without first completing their prototype, and Holmes runs a validity trial for Pfizer on terminally ill cancer patients using the nonfunctional device. Lucas learns of Holmes' deceptions and gathers the board for a vote of no confidence in her as CEO, but Holmes counters by suggesting a pivot from pharmaceuticals to retail, and announces that Theranos is receiving $20 million from an "old friend": Balwani, whom she brings on as COO.
4	"Old White Men"	Michael Showalter	Dan LeFranc	March 10, 2022
In 2010, with Balwani as COO, Theranos has drastically increased security measures to keep its departments siloed off, which makes Gibbons suspicious. Gibbons is alarmed when he learns that Theranos is pitching to Walgreens without a working prototype, and warns Robertson of the harm it will inflict upon ordinary people. Robertson dismisses his concerns and tells Holmes about their meeting, leading Holmes to fire Gibbons. However, the entire engineering team threatens to quit in retaliation for Gibbons' firing, so Holmes rehires Gibbons but places him in a menial desk job. Walgreens pulls out of the partnership after Holmes repeatedly avoids showing them Theranos' labs, but executive Jay Rosan, who is enamored by the culture of Silicon Valley, convinces CFO Wade Miquelon to keep the deal in order to avoid them becoming obsolete. Holmes later entices former Secretary of State George Shultz to join Theranos' board, hoping to make enough government contacts to speed up the FDA's regulatory process.
5	"Flower of Life"	Francesca Gregorini	Liz Hannah	March 17, 2022
By February 2013, Theranos has still not launched its "wellness centers" inside Walgreens stores due to its prototype remaining incomplete; Miquelon gives Holmes till September. Holmes has launched a counter-suit against Fuisz and hired David Boies as her attorney; Fuisz, meanwhile, subpoenas Gibbons - whose name is on all of Holmes' patents - to testify that Holmes made no scientific contributions to the company. Gibbons is desperate to leave the company since he has been prevented from working in his lab, but faces pressure not to testify from Theranos' legal team, as well as the fact that his health insurance is tied to his employment. Gibbons ultimately kills himself the day before his scheduled testimony; Holmes shows little remorse for his death. Fuisz subsequently accepts a settlement from Boies, but later contacts Gardner, who tells him Holmes is a fraud. Holmes and Balwani decide to commit intellectual property theft by repurposing Siemens' blood-testing technology for Theranos' machines, which allows them to launch in Walgreens.
6	"Iron Sisters"	Francesca Gregorini	Wei-Ning Yu	March 24, 2022
In October 2013, Fuisz, Gardner, and Gibbons' widow Rochelle contact Wall Street Journal reporter John Carreyrou to expose Theranos' fraud; Carreyrou tells them they need more sources. Recent college graduate Erika Cheung joins Theranos as a lab assistant and befriends Shultz's grandson Tyler, an intern. The two soon discover that Theranos is falsifying blood test data on real patients and using Siemens' machines to run their tests. Tyler emails their concerns to Holmes to establish an electronic paper trail, resulting in his firing by Balwani. Tyler and Cheung then attempt to convince the elder Shultz of Holmes' lies, but Shultz rebuffs them, and Cheung is soon fired. Lab director Mark Roessler divulges details of Theranos' fraudulent practices to Fuisz, who passes them on to Carreyrou. Tyler and Cheung subsequently contact Carreyrou themselves.
7	"Heroes"	Erica Watson	Liz Heldens	March 31, 2022
By 2015, Holmes has become a media celebrity, while Carreyrou has amassed several more background sources for his exposé, including doctors who attest to a multitude of false diagnoses patients have received from Theranos. However, Theranos sends lawyers and spies to scare most of Carreyrou's sources into silence, including Roessler, while Rupert Murdoch, the Journal's owner, invests $125 million into the company. Tyler refuses to sign any documents from Theranos' litigators. Shultz warns Holmes that Balwani is a malign influence. Carreyrou and his editor Judith Baker meet with Boies along with Theranos' lawyers and catch them admitting to using Siemens' machines in their labs after repeatedly denying doing so, giving them enough evidence to run the article. Carreyrou's piece is published that night, sending the public into a frenzy while Holmes insists on fighting the allegations.
8	"Lizzy"	Erica Watson	Teleplay by : Elizabeth Meriwether; Story by : Elizabeth Meriwether & Sofya Levitsky-Weitz	April 7, 2022
In the wake of Carreyrou's article, Holmes and Balwani scramble to get Theranos' board on their side. Carreyrou worries that the article will get swept up in the news cycle, but Tyler agrees to go on record for a follow-up piece, while Cheung files a formal complaint to the CMS about the mismanagement of Theranos' labs. The CMS subsequently investigates, and publishes a damning report in February 2016 that orders Theranos' facilities shut down for two years. Holmes forces Balwani out of the company by announcing his resignation to the board behind his back, ending their relationship. She later begins dating hotel heir Billy Evans, and remains in denial of having done any wrong. A postscript notes the numerous fraud charges faced by Holmes and Balwani, the litany of false diagnoses provided by Theranos machines, and the hundreds of jobs and millions of dollars lost in the company's collapse.

== Production ==
=== Development ===
On April 10, 2019, Deadline Hollywood reported that Hulu had given the production a series order for 6 to 10 episodes. The series would be executive produced by Kate McKinnon, the host of The Dropout Rebecca Jarvis, and its producers Taylor Dunn and Victoria Thompson. The series would be Searchlight Television’s inaugural production. Upon the casting of Amanda Seyfried, she also joined the miniseries as a producer while Elizabeth Meriwether, Liz Heldens, Liz Hannah, and Katherine Pope joined Dunn and Thompson as executive producers. On March 31, 2021, Michael Showalter and Jordana Mollick joined the limited series as executive producers. Showalter directed the first four episodes of the series.

In the documentary You Can See Everything, Seyfried said that she was prohibited from meeting with Holmes to prepare for the role, instead reading numerous pieces of coverage about Holmes and watching all of her interviews. To date, the only known interaction between Seyfried and Holmes occurred via a prison call while Seyfried was visiting the home of Holmes' partner Billy Evans, as part of the filming of You Can See Everything.

=== Casting ===
Kate McKinnon was originally cast to star as Elizabeth Holmes, former CEO of Theranos. On February 18, 2021, McKinnon dropped out of the project without an explanation. On March 29, 2021, Amanda Seyfried was cast to replace McKinnon. A day later, Naveen Andrews joined the main cast. On June 10, 2021, William H. Macy, Laurie Metcalf, Elizabeth Marvel, Utkarsh Ambudkar, Kate Burton, Stephen Fry, Michel Gill, Michael Ironside, Bill Irwin, and Josh Pais were cast in recurring roles. On August 3, 2021, Dylan Minnette, Alan Ruck, Bashir Salahuddin, Mary Lynn Rajskub, Hart Bochner, James Hiroyuki Liao, Nicky Endres, Camryn Mi-Young Kim, and Andrew Leeds were cast in recurring roles. On August 5, 2021, Sam Waterston, Kurtwood Smith and Anne Archer were cast in recurring roles. On September 14, 2021, LisaGay Hamilton, Michaela Watkins, Ebon Moss-Bachrach, Kevin Sussman, Sam Straley, and Shaun Brown joined the cast in recurring capacities.

== Release ==
The series premiered on March 3, 2022, with the first three episodes available immediately and the rest debuting on a weekly basis on Hulu. In international markets, it was released simultaneously via Star content hub on Disney+, on Star+ in Latin America, and on Disney+ Hotstar in India and Southeast Asia.

== Reception ==
=== Viewership ===
Market research company Parrot Analytics, which looks at consumer engagement in consumer research, streaming, downloads, and on social media, reported that The Dropout was the ninth most in-demand new series with a demand rating of 17.3 times the market average, between March 12–18, 2022. Analytics company Samba TV, which gathers viewership data from certain smart TVs and content providers, revealed that 499,000 US households watched The Dropout in its first four days of streaming. Nielsen Media Research, which records streaming viewership on U.S. television screens, announced that The Dropout generated 255 million minutes of watch time from February 28 to March 6, ranking as the tenth most-streamed original series. Between March 28 and April 3, the series garnered 190 million minutes of watch time from, placing tenth again.

Viewership of The Dropout increased by 186% in September 2026 compared with August, following the September 6 announcement that You Can See Everything had been produced in secret. Interest continued to grow as the film's October 16 wide release approached, with viewership during the week of October 12 increasing by 92% compared with the previous week. The series accumulated 420,000 hours viewed in August, equivalent to approximately 62,000 estimated views based on its nearly seven-hour runtime. In September, viewing time increased to 1.2 million hours, or approximately 176,000 estimated views. During the week of October 12 alone, the series accumulated a further 422,000 hours viewed, equivalent to approximately 62,000 estimated views. During October, The Dropout accumulated 997,000 hours viewed, or approximately 148,000 estimated views, bringing its total viewing time since September to 2.2 million hours, equivalent to approximately 296,000 estimated views. JustWatch also reported increased interest in the series, with its search points rising by 200% week over week following the announcement and the series reaching tenth place on the platform's streaming search chart.

=== Critical response ===
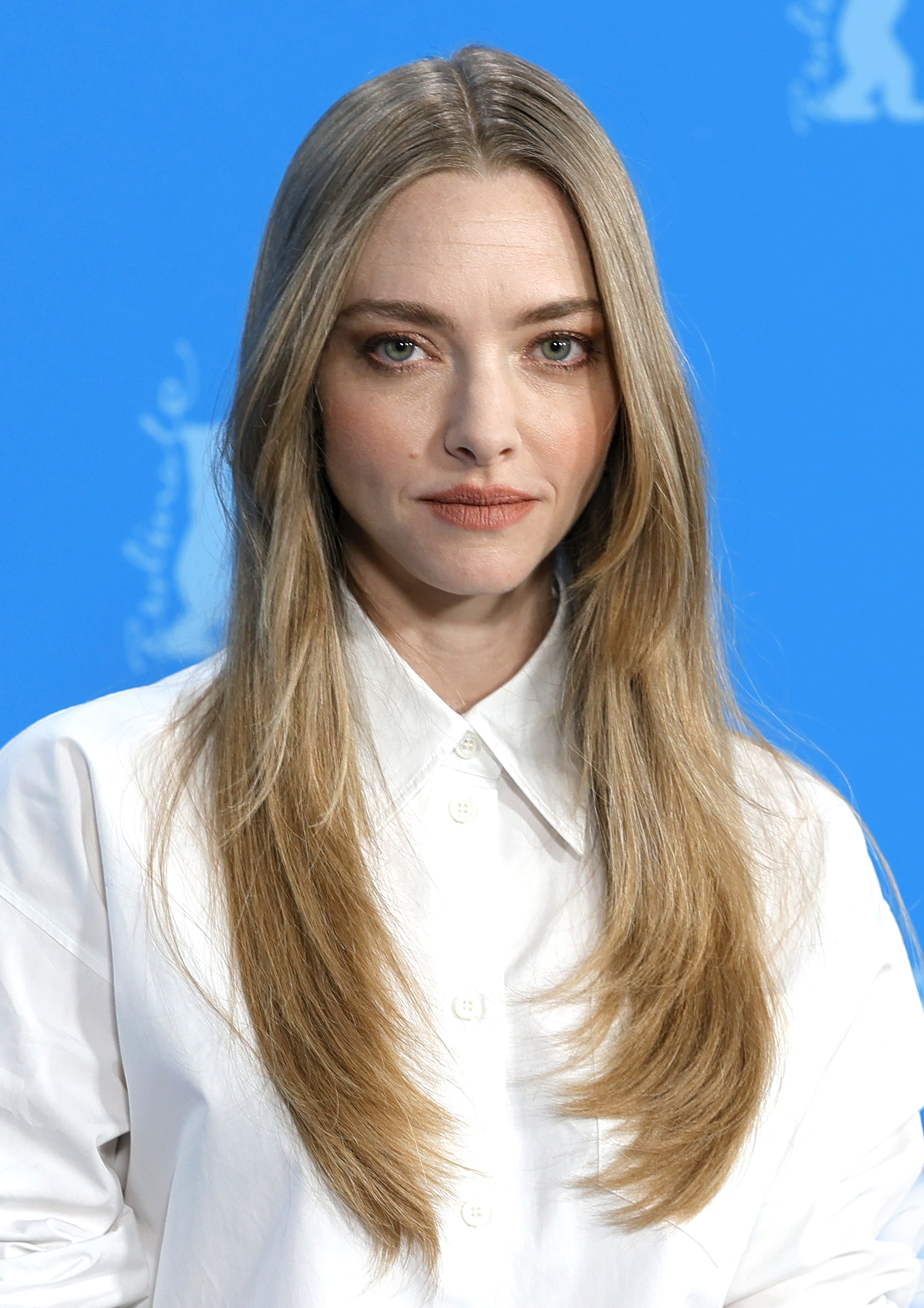
Amanda Seyfried received critical acclaim for her performance in the miniseries.

On review aggregator website Rotten Tomatoes, the limited series holds a 90% approval rating, based on 96 critic reviews, with an average rating of 7.4/10. The website's critics consensus reads: "The Dropout succeeds more as a docudrama than a dark comedy, but Amanda Seyfried's disquieting portrayal of Elizabeth Holmes brings fresh blood to this retelling of recent history." On Metacritic, it has a score of 75 out of 100, based on 34 critics, indicating "generally favorable reviews".

Caroline Framke of Variety found the miniseries very impressive for its genuine portrait of Elizabeth Holmes, acclaimed the performances of the actors, especially Amanda Seyfried and Naveen Andrews, and wrote that it skillfully manages to cover Holmes' life throughout the years flawlessly with its edits. Daniel Fienberg of The Hollywood Reporter acclaimed Seyfried for her performance, while praising the supporting cast, complimented how the miniseries manages to depict Holmes and the different aspects of her personality, and found the characterization of Holmes' entourage its best feature.

Reviewing the miniseries for Rolling Stone, Alan Sepinwall gave a rating of 5 out of 5 stars and described it as "a maddening, gripping, and at times startlingly funny recreation of a story that would feel too absurd to be true if we didn't already know otherwise". Beth Webb of Empire rated the miniseries 4 out of 5 stars, praised the performances of Seyfried and Andrews, and found it cohesive and entrancing. Joyce Slaton of Common Sense Media rated the miniseries 4 out of 5 stars, praised the performances of the actors, and stated that it illustrates Holmes went too far to make a positive impact on the world. Lucy Mangan of The Guardian rated the miniseries 3 out of 5 stars, praised the performances of the actors and the story, writing: "It's clunky at points, but Amanda Seyfried excels as one-time billionaire grifter Elizabeth Holmes – and the story is simply too jaw-dropping to pass up."

=== Legacy ===
The Dropout was prominently featured in the 2026 documentary film You Can See Everything, which covers the period of time before and after Holmes' sentence began. Seyfried is a prominent subject of the film and additionally reprises her role as Holmes for recreations of interactions involving the real Holmes that the documentary crew were not able to film. Christopher Abbott replaces Garrett Coffey as Holmes’ partner Billy Evans during the recreations.

== Accolades ==
Year	Award	Category	Recipient(s)	Result	Ref.
2022	Dorian TV Awards	Best TV Movie or Miniseries	The Dropout	Nominated	
2022	Dorian TV Awards	Best TV Performance	Amanda Seyfried	Nominated	
2022	Gold Derby TV Awards	Best Limited/Movie Actress	Amanda Seyfried	Won	
2022	Gold Derby TV Awards	Best Limited/Movie Supporting Actor	Naveen Andrews	Nominated	
2022	Hollywood Critics Association TV Awards	Best Streaming Limited or Anthology Series	The Dropout	Nominated	
2022	Hollywood Critics Association TV Awards	Best Actress in a Streaming Limited or Anthology Series or Movie	Amanda Seyfried	Won	
2022	Hollywood Critics Association TV Awards	Best Supporting Actor in a Streaming Limited or Anthology Series or Movie	Naveen Andrews	Nominated	
2022	Hollywood Critics Association TV Awards	Best Supporting Actress in a Streaming Limited or Anthology Series or Movie	Laurie Metcalf	Nominated	
2022	Hollywood Critics Association TV Awards	Best Directing in a Streaming Limited or Anthology Series or Movie	Michael Showalter (for "Green Juice")	Nominated	
2022	Hollywood Critics Association TV Awards	Best Writing in a Streaming Limited or Anthology Series or Movie	Elizabeth Meriwether (for "I'm In a Hurry")	Nominated	
2022	MTV Movie & TV Awards	Best Performance in a Show	Amanda Seyfried	Nominated	
2022	Primetime Emmy Awards	Outstanding Limited or Anthology Series	Elizabeth Meriwether, Katherine Pope, Michael Showalter, Jordana Mollick, Rebecca Jarvis, Taylor Dunn, Victoria Thompson, Liz Heldens, Liz Hannah, Hilton Smith, Dan LeFranc, Amanda Seyfried, Hilary Bettis, and Megan Mascena	Nominated	
2022	Primetime Emmy Awards	Outstanding Lead Actress in a Limited or Anthology Series or Movie	Amanda Seyfried	Won	
2022	Primetime Emmy Awards	Outstanding Directing for a Limited or Anthology Series or Movie	Francesca Gregorini (for "Iron Sisters")	Nominated	
2022	Primetime Emmy Awards	Outstanding Directing for a Limited or Anthology Series or Movie	Michael Showalter (for "Green Juice")	Nominated	
2022	Primetime Emmy Awards	Outstanding Writing for a Limited or Anthology Series or Movie	Elizabeth Meriwether (for "I'm in a Hurry")	Nominated	
2022	Primetime Creative Arts Emmy Awards	Outstanding Casting for a Limited or Anthology Series or Movie	Jeanie Bacharach, Mark Rutman, and Alison Goodman	Nominated	
2022	ReFrame Stamp	IMDbPro Top 200 Scripted TV Recipients	The Dropout	Won	
2022	Set Decorators Society of America Awards	Best Achievement in Décor/Design of a Television Movie or Limited Series	Kimberly Leonard and Cat Smith	Nominated	
2022	Television Critics Association Awards	Outstanding Achievement in Movies, Miniseries or Specials	The Dropout	Nominated	
2022	Television Critics Association Awards	Individual Achievement in Drama	Amanda Seyfried	Nominated	
2023	Critics' Choice Television Awards	Best Limited Series	The Dropout	Won	
2023	Critics' Choice Television Awards	Best Actress in a Limited Series or Movie Made for Television	Amanda Seyfried	Won	
2023	Golden Globe Awards	Best Limited or Anthology Series or Television Film	The Dropout	Nominated	
2023	Golden Globe Awards	Best Actress – Limited or Anthology Series or Television Film	Amanda Seyfried	Won	
2023	Producers Guild of America Awards	Best Limited Series	The Dropout	Won	
2023	Screen Actors Guild Awards	Outstanding Performance by a Female Actor in a Television Movie or Limited Series	Amanda Seyfried	Nominated	
2023	Writers Guild of America Awards	Limited Series	Hilary Bettis, Liz Hannah, Liz Heldens, Dan LeFranc, Sofya Levitsky-Weitz, Matt Lutsky, Elizabeth Meriwether, and Wei-Ning Yu	Nominated	

== See also ==
- List of podcast adaptations
