= Tyler Shultz =

American researcher, founder, and whistleblower

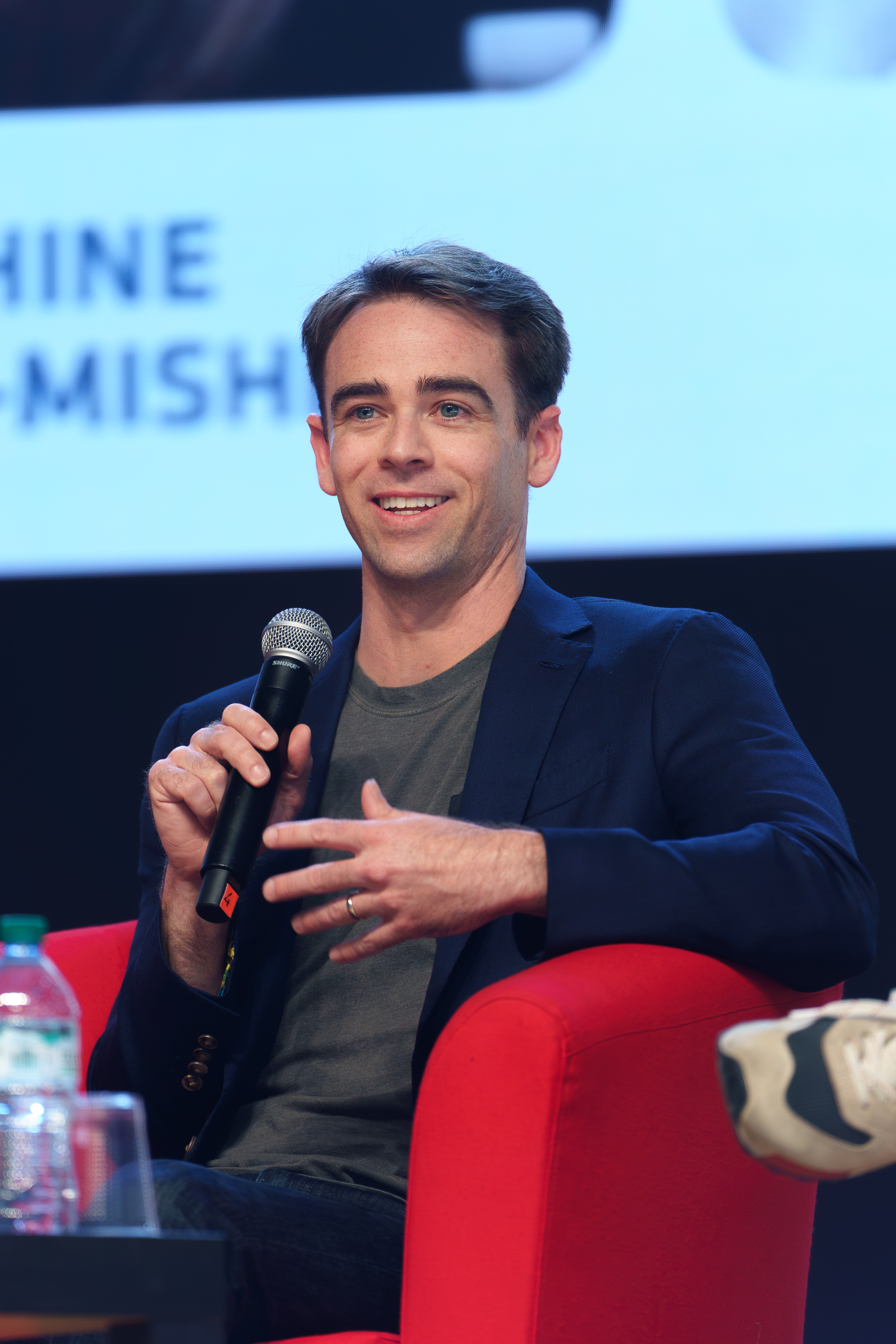
- Shultz at the International Journalism Festival, 2024
- Born: Tyler O'Brien Shultz; 1990 or 1991 (age 35–36)
- Education: Stanford University (BS)
- Relatives: George Shultz (grandfather)

Tyler O'Brien Shultz (born 1990/1991) is an American researcher, founder, and whistleblower. In 2017, he co-founded Flux Biosciences, a biotechnology company which develops healthcare diagnostics that can be used in households, and in 2022, he founded The Healthyr Company, also a health insights service.

Shultz was among the whistleblowers who exposed the fraudulent practices of Theranos, a company founded by Elizabeth Holmes; he had been hired as an intern in 2013 and proceeded to confidentially inform reportage on and subsequent investigations into Theranos after resigning in 2014. Specifically, he was a crucial source for The Wall Street Journal where John Carreyrou reported on Theranos for several years.

In 2017, Shultz was named to Forbes' 30 Under 30 for Healthcare. Forbes stated that Shultz, aged 26 at the time, "shaped the year's biggest healthcare story" as a Theranos whistleblower while also crediting his work at Stanford University on analyzing saliva samples for marijuana. The same year, he received the James Madison Freedom of Information Award.

Since 2019, Shultz has advised Ethics in Entrepreneurship, a nonprofit founded by fellow whistleblower Erika Cheung, whom Shultz had met at Theranos. The nonprofit is dedicated toward implementing ethical guidelines in business.

== Education ==
Shultz attended Stanford University, where he studied biology. He graduated in 2013.

== Career ==
=== Theranos ===
While at Stanford University, Shultz met Holmes, the founder of Theranos, through his grandfather, former Secretary of State George Shultz, who was serving as a board member of Theranos at the time. The three were speaking together in the senior Shultz's living room.

Compelled by Holmes' pitch, and encouraged by his grandfather, Shultz requested an internship at Theranos following his junior year of college, which he received. Afterward, he was offered a full-time position at Theranos as a research engineer, specifically working on the Edison device purported to test blood samples for diseases. Throughout the course of his time at Theranos, Shultz and Holmes were friends, remaining close due to the latter's proximity to Shultz's family and, in particular, his grandfather.

However, over the course of the next eight months, Shultz, along with Cheung and others, went on to discover "internal malpractice," data manipulation, false positives in syphilis tests, and falsification of blood samples, among other problems. They additionally noted a culture of deception in which it was an "open secret" that Theranos' technology didn't actually work.

On April 11, 2014, Shultz voiced his concerns with Holmes without any results, after which he faced blowback and belittlement from Theranos' president, Sunny Balwani, via email. He subsequently resigned.

=== After Theranos ===
After leaving and exposing Theranos, Shultz worked at Genia Technologies, a company for DNA sequencing. He also worked at the Wang Lab at Stanford University, specifically to study giant magnetoresistive (GMR) technology.

In 2017, Shultz founded and has since served as the CEO of Flux Biosciences, a company looking to bring health diagnostics into households. The company has also specifically expressed interest in women's fertility issues by innovating in-vitro diagnostics. In the same year, Shultz was a finalist for Forbes' Global Change the World Competition which held a prize of $500,000. Since then, Shultz has discussed the pressures he has faced from venture capitalists to "exaggerate technology claims."

Shultz advises Ethics in Entrepreneurship, a nonprofit founded and run by Cheung in 2020. The nonprofit "aims to help young entrepreneurs just starting out to prioritize ethical practices from the very beginning" in order to "prevent another Theranos from happening". In addition to citing Theranos as an example, the nonprofit also points to other issues in the tech sector such as workplace discrimination and harassment as well as "lack of product use oversight" in various companies.

In 2022, Shultz founded The Healthyr Company, a healthcare company that seeks to provide health insights and early interventions to users through analysis of blood samples. Shultz is also an advisor to The Signals Network, a whistleblower support organization. He has additionally served as a consultant to Qvin, a healthcare company that focuses on analyzing menstrual blood for health information.

Following his involvement in the Theranos case, Shultz became a public speaker on business ethics, whistleblowing, and corporate governance. He has delivered keynote addresses at industry conferences and technology events, as well as lectures at universities and business schools, including Stanford University, and has spoken to corporate and professional audiences. His speaking engagements draw on his firsthand experience to examine organizational misconduct and the challenges individuals face when raising concerns internally.

His role in exposing Theranos has also been the subject of academic case studies, including Out for Blood: Tyler Shultz and Theranos, published through Harvard Business School’s case collection.

== Whistleblowing ==
=== Reporting ===
Alongside Erika Cheung and Adam Rosendorff, Shultz exposed the fraudulent practices at Theranos by using an alias to contact several regulators and publications about Theranos' fraud, after which media attention on Holmes' deceit caught on.

Shultz is known as "the first" to speak out about Theranos's deceit. Specifically, Shultz's confidential reporting informed a string of Wall Street Journal articles by John Carreyrou about Holmes and Theranos starting in 2015. At the time, Shultz was under legal pressure to stay quiet. In 2016, however, Shultz's identity was revealed to the public by his own decision in the Wall Street Journal.

=== Retaliation ===
Since leaving and exposing Theranos, Shultz faced a lawsuit from Theranos and incurred half a million dollars in legal fees alone. Additionally, for several years, Shultz believed he was being tailed and spied on by Theranos' private investigators. Carreyrou similarly suspected that Theranos closely monitored him and Shultz for a year.

Shultz has stated that "he wishes he had taken his information directly to the SEC and, at some level, understands his relationship with his grandfather likely influenced his decision not to do so." Eventually, however, Shultz worked with the federal investigation to prosecute Theranos for criminal and civil charges.

=== Trial ===
In the Holmes trial, Shultz was considered a potential witness but was ultimately not called. However, Shultz's father, Alex Shultz, took the witness stand to describe Holmes' "vengeance" and manipulation against his family.

Later, Shultz appeared in the overflow room of the Holmes trial's courthouse during closing arguments; reporters spotted him, though he didn't provide comments until a verdict was handed down. Holmes was convicted in January 2022 and sentenced that September.

=== Other ===
Shultz's accounts of Theranos have appeared in Carreyrou's book, Bad Blood: Secrets and Lies in a Silicon Valley Startup; Alex Gibney's HBO documentary The Inventor: Out for Blood in Silicon Valley, featuring Shultz's deposition tapes; and the ABC podcast The Dropout.

Shultz has also spoken at numerous venues, mostly business schools, about his experiences as a whistleblower and founder. In 2020, Shultz recorded and released an Audible audiobook, titled Thicker Than Water, detailing his time at and after Theranos.

In the Hulu miniseries The Dropout, Shultz was portrayed by Dylan Minnette. Some of Shultz's narrative was changed in the show's script, such as the omission of other entities Shultz contacted before meeting Carreyrou.

== Personal life ==
Shultz's grandfather was George Shultz, a former Secretary of State under Ronald Reagan as well as a Secretary of the Treasury under Richard Nixon. Because the senior Shultz was a board member of Theranos at the time, Tyler Shultz's whistleblowing on the health technology company caused his relationship with his grandfather to be strained.

At first, following Shultz's departure from Theranos, his grandfather sided with Holmes; the two didn't speak for several months following private conversations and attempts at resolution. Remarking on his relationship with his grandfather, Shultz stated:

That was extremely tough. This whole saga has taken a financial, emotional, and social toll on my relationships. The toll it took on my grandfather’s relationship was probably the worst. It is tough to explain. I had a few very honest conversations with him.

However, the two eventually reconciled, with Shultz's grandfather recognizing the rightness of his position and showing pride in his decisions. George Shultz died in 2021.
