= The Inventor: Out for Blood in Silicon Valley =

2019 American documentary film

- Official poster
- Directed by: Alex Gibney
- Produced by: Alex Gibney; Jessie Deeter; Erin Edeiken
- Cinematography: Lincoln Else; Antonio Rossi
- Edited by: Andy Grieve; Alexis Johnson (co-editor)
- Music by: Will Bates
- Production companies: Jigsaw Productions; HBO Documentary Films
- Distributed by: HBO
- Release dates: January 24, 2019 (Sundance); March 18, 2019 (United States)
- Running time: 119 minutes
- Country: United States
- Language: English

The Inventor: Out for Blood in Silicon Valley is a 2019 American documentary film, directed and produced by Alex Gibney. The film revolves around Elizabeth Holmes and her former company Theranos. It is considered a companion piece to the book Bad Blood: Secrets and Lies in a Silicon Valley Startup.

The Inventor had its world premiere at the Sundance Film Festival on January 24, 2019. It was produced by HBO Documentary Films and Jigsaw Productions with a television premiere on March 18, 2019, on HBO as well as its streaming platforms.

== Overview ==
The Inventor chronicles the rise and fall of Theranos, interspersed with footage of Holmes and her COO Sunny Balwani making grandiose proclamations about Theranos and the value it was providing. It includes visual flashbacks to the life and work of Thomas Edison, who failed hundreds of times before finally succeeding. Theranos's miniature blood testing labs were named "Edisons" after the famous inventor. Holmes convinced investors to pour millions of dollars into the company, including Rupert Murdoch, Larry Ellison, Tim Draper, Sam Nunn, Bill Frist, and David Boies. The board of directors Holmes acquired was composed of a variety of wealthy and well-connected individuals, including George P. Shultz, Henry Kissinger, and James Mattis. Unfortunately for Theranos, Holmes was seemingly more interested in the marketing, promotion, naming, and media presence of the technology than in the product's actual functionality. Holmes and Balwani fostered a culture of paranoia and secrecy at the company, seeming to believe that any criticism must be a plot from their blood-testing competitors Quest Diagnostics and LabCorp. They hired personal bodyguards, led chants against Quest at employee morale events, and refused to listen to negative feedback from medical experts. In 2015, John Carreyrou published an article in the Wall Street Journal, calling into question the veracity of the Edison technology. Holmes fought back with aggressive legal action until Theranos was forced to dissolve in 2018. Theranos, Holmes, and Balwani were all charged with fraud by the U.S. Securities and Exchange Commission (SEC). Holmes and Balwani were also charged with wire fraud and conspiracy.

People interviewed in the film include:

- Erika Cheung and Tyler Shultz, two whistleblowers who brought down Theranos despite being junior employees fresh out of college. Cheung and Shultz discussed how the company buried error reports and considered pushback against impossible demands from Holmes as signs of not being a "team player". Cheung wrote a letter to the federal regulator Centers for Medicare & Medicaid Services (CMS), and Shultz provided crucial information for John Carreyrou's article.
- Dan Ariely, a professor of psychology, who discusses why so many investors gave so heavily to Theranos, and why Holmes might have lied to the media and her colleagues about how her technology operated.
- Roger Parloff, a writer and editor of Fortune magazine who interviewed Holmes multiple times, wrote a front cover article on Theranos in 2014, and then wrote a follow-up article in 2015 on Holmes's deceptions.
- Ken Auletta, a journalist with The New Yorker who interviewed Holmes multiple times and wrote an article on Holmes in 2014.
- John Carreyrou, a journalist with The Wall Street Journal who read Auletta's work in The New Yorker, investigated Theranos's practices, wrote the article that described Holmes's misrepresentation of Theranos's technology, and helped turn the attention of government regulators to Theranos.
- Phyllis Gardner, a Stanford professor of medicine and a member of the Harvard Medical School Board of Fellows who was, in 2002, highly skeptical of Holmes's medical ideas as a student.
- Rochelle Gibbons, the widow of Theranos's chief biochemist Ian Gibbons who did much of the work behind the patents filed by Holmes. He told Holmes about problems with the technology and, when repeatedly rebuffed, committed suicide in 2013.
- Serena Stewart, a phlebotomy trainer who trained employees at the Theranos Wellness Centers set up by Walgreens in Arizona.
- Stephanie Seitz, a naturopath (ND) who discussed the issues with people ordering and attempting to interpret their own labwork, as well Theranos's inconsistent results in Arizona.
- Tim Draper, an investor in Theranos.
- Channing Robertson, an advisor to Theranos.
- Cheryl Gafner, Dave Phillipides, Douglas Matje, Ryan Wistort, Tony Nugent, Matt Hernan, and Patrick O'Neill, all former employees of Theranos.

== Production ==
The documentary was announced to the public in May 2018. Alex Gibney would direct the film, with Gibney, Erin Edeiken and Jessie Deeter, serving as producers on the film, while HBO Documentary Films and Jigsaw Productions would produce the film and HBO distributing. Holmes declined to participate in the film, and so the documentary used footage of her shot by Errol Morris and other filmed appearances.

== Release ==
The film had its world premiere at the Sundance Film Festival on January 24, 2019. It was released on March 18, 2019, by HBO.

== Reception ==
=== Critical response ===
On review aggregator site Rotten Tomatoes, the film holds an approval rating of 79% based on 61 reviews, with an average rating of 7.2/10. The site's critics' consensus reads: "Alex Gibney's The Inventor declines to outright condemn the actions by Theranos founder Elizabeth Holmes, but instead provides a comprehensive overview of the scandal that allows viewers to mull over its implications towards the broader Silicon Valley." On Metacritic, the film has a weighted average score of 66 out of 100, based on six critics, indicating "generally favorable" reviews.

Ed Power of The Daily Telegraph gave the film a score of 4/5 stars, saying that it "was a devastating warning of where these unchecked messianic tendencies lead and the lives they can destroy along the way." Brian Lowry of CNN described the film as "part thriller, part tale of corporate whistleblowers and perhaps foremost, a warning of how an apparent fraudster spouting tech jargon can bedazzle people who really should know better". Eric Deggans of NPR wrote: "[Gibney] shows how Holmes and her supporters pushed the limits of Silicon Valley's culture of risk-taking and overpromising until they created a house of cards that collapsed under close scrutiny."

Some criticisms have been brought up regarding certain elements in the film. Emily Yoshida of Vulture criticized the documentary's focus: "The Inventor ultimately can’t decide if it’s about the specific, contained absurdities of the Theranos scam, or the phenomenology of scams like Theranos." Tasha Robinson of The Verge praised Gibney's ability to make complex ideas accessible but also criticized that the film "feels a little empty." Conversely, Rachel Syme of The New Yorker praised the film's look at the "vexingly sphinxlike" Holmes.

The film was also criticized for presenting naturopath Stephanie Seitz as a physician and as a "spokesperson for the medical community".

=== Accolades ===
Gibney won the Writers Guild of America Award for Best Documentary Screenplay at the 72nd Writers Guild of America Awards for his screenplay, earning Gibney a record fourth award in this category.
