= Association for Molecular Pathology =

American non-profit professional society

- Abbreviation: AMP
- Formation: 1995; 31 years ago
- Type: Nonprofit
- Legal status: 501(c)(3)
- Headquarters: Rockville, Maryland
- Fields: Molecular diagnostics
- Members: Approximately 3,100
- President: Jane S. Gibson, Ph.D
- Website: www.amp.org

The Association for Molecular Pathology (abbreviated AMP) is a professional association of individuals serving patients through molecular diagnostics testing. Founded in 1995, the Association has more than 3,100 members in over 50 countries.

Molecular diagnostics is one of the fastest growing fields of health care. Molecular genetic testing provides patients and their doctors with accurate diagnosis of a broad range of cancers, infectious diseases, and inherited conditions. By identifying the exact molecular genetic alterations or biomarkers in a patient’s specimen, molecular genetic testing can identify treatment targets for personalized precision medicine that have improved outcomes for many patients.

AMP is a volunteer-driven organization that concentrates on providing educational opportunities to practitioners and the broader medical community, advocating for the profession and the molecular professional, and advancing clinical care through the publication of evidence-based practice guidelines. AMP members work in academic and community medical centers, private and public health laboratories, government agencies, and the diagnostic manufacturing industry. Its membership includes pathologists, clinical laboratory scientists, technologists, trainees (who receive free membership while in training), clinicians and other health care personnel, government employees involved in regulatory oversight, and individuals in the in vitro diagnostics and pharmaceutical industries.

AMP members are actively involved in volunteer committees, scientific subdivisions, and working groups to advance the field of molecular diagnostics.

== Mission ==
The Association for Molecular Pathology is a 501(c)(3) non-profit scientific society that advances the clinical practice, science, and excellence of molecular and genomic laboratory medicine through education, innovation, and advocacy to enable the highest quality health care.

== History ==
AMP was formed in 1995 to provide structure and leadership to the emerging field of molecular diagnostics. The motivation for forming AMP came from numerous discussions and workshops that took place in the late 1980s and early 1990s. As new molecular technologies and applications emerged, questions about their use, standardization, licensing and accreditation, as well as medical training created consensus for a professional focus. At a workshop in November 1993, participants formed working groups that later became the Association’s initial four subdivisions: Hematopathology, Solid Tumors, Genetics, and Infectious Diseases. In 2012, Informatics was added as a fifth concentration, reflecting the new challenges and opportunities that Big Data management and interpretation has brought to the molecular field.

== Clinical Practice & Patient Care ==
AMP publishes evidence-based guidelines and freely available reports to provide best practices and recommendations, and to highlight the developments and changing practices in its rapidly evolving field. AMP frequently collaborates with other well-respected professional organizations, such as the College of American Pathologists (CAP), American Society of Clinical Oncology (ASCO), American College of Obstetricians and Gynecologists (ACOG) and American College of Medical Genetics and Genomics (ACMG) to share expertise and broaden the reach of various publications. Guidelines are authored by AMP members elected to the Clinical Practice Committee or appointed by the Board of Directors as subject matter experts to specific working groups.

== Education ==
AMP develops a wide range of educational resources, available in to bring understanding of new and evolving molecular testing techniques to members and other medical professionals. The Association hosts its annual meeting every November in North America, and an international meeting in the spring or summer. AMP organizes educational webinars throughout the year as well as review courses and certificate programs for individuals seeking in-depth knowledge of molecular topics. AMP also outreaches to patients with an education webpage, Molecular Medicine for Patients, focused on molecular testing and its impact on human health. These educational resources for patients are available in both English and Spanish.

== Advocacy ==
AMP advocates for molecular professionals and the patients they serve. In the U.S. molecular genetics testing is governed by a wide range of regulations, including the Clinical Laboratory Improvement Act (CLIA), the Centers for Medicare and Medicaid, and the Food and Drug Administration, that impact the performance and reimbursement of medical laboratory services. Through its advocacy efforts, such as the AMP Economics Summit, AMP strives to modernize the regulatory environment. It works to inform the U.S. Congress and federal agencies regarding public policy issues affecting molecular pathology. AMP seeks to shape and promote policies that ensure broad and equitable patient access to appropriate laboratory testing. Internationally, AMP members are involved in advocating for appropriate molecular diagnostic testing in several countries around the world.

Association for Molecular Pathology v. Myriad Genetics, Inc.

AMP was the lead plaintiff in a landmark lawsuit challenging gene patents. As described by Executive Director Mary Williams, “gene patents created an intractable challenge for medical professionals and presented a potential barrier to entry for new technologies. In order for the field to advance, the courts needed to weigh in.” In June 2013, the U.S. Supreme Court unanimously ruled, “A naturally occurring DNA segment is a product of nature and not patent eligible merely because it has been isolated, but cDNA is patent eligible because it is not naturally occurring.” On the fifth anniversary of the ruling, AMP released a video providing some of the background about AMP's decision to join the case and its journey to the Supreme Court.

Association for Molecular Pathology v. U.S Food and Drug Administration (FDA)

The U.S. Food and Drug Administration (FDA) issued a final rule on May 6, 2024, to regulate laboratory-developed test (LDT) as medical devices and to oversee clinical laboratories as manufacturers of medical device. This rule would have increased reporting requirements by clinical laboratories, including registration for FDA premarket approval before launching new LDTs. AMP opposed this legislation and filed a lawsuit against the FDA in August 2024, citing concerns with the negative impact on patient access to LDTs and on laboratory innovation, as well as the expected increased costs of LDTs.

On May 31, 2025, a U.S. federal court vacated this rule in favor of AMP and the American Clinical Laboratory Association, which had filed a separate lawsuit against the FDA. The court ruled that the regulation of LDTs as medical device “defies bedrock principles of statutory, common sense and longstanding industry practice” and that “Congress had already considered issues raised by LDTs in CLIA and had given the CMS regulatory authority over LDTs, not the FDA.” The FDA rule was officially withdrawn in September 2025.

== Publications ==
AMP co-owns The Journal of Molecular Diagnostics (JMD) with the American Society for Investigative Pathology. First published in 1999, JMD is the highest ranked journal in its field, with an Impact Factor rating of 5.341 in 2021. Its focus includes original research on advances in molecular diagnostic medicine in oncology, infectious diseases, hematopathology, inherited diseases, clinical informatics, as well as review articles. AMP members receive complementary online access to the journal with their membership, discounts on publication fees, and AMP makes its practice guidelines available free of charge. In addition, AMP working groups also collaborate with colleagues from other scholarly societies on reports appearing in publications other than JMD.

== Partnerships ==
AMP receives financial support from and collaborates with corporate sponsors to support the annual meeting and various other educational offerings.
