= Wade Miquelon =

American business executive (born 1964)

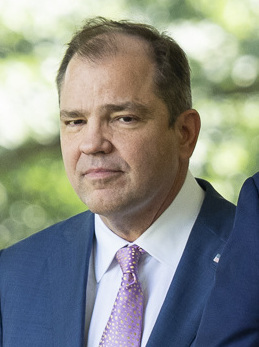
- Born: October 28, 1964 (age 62)
- Education: Purdue University (BS); Washington University in St. Louis (MBA)
- Occupation: Former CEO of Jo-Ann Stores

Wade Miquelon (born October 28, 1964) is an American business executive and former CEO of Jo-Ann Stores. He was previously an executive at Procter & Gamble and Walgreens.

== Education ==
Miquelon received a Bachelor of Science degree in civil engineering from Purdue University in 1987 and a Masters of Business Administration from the Olin Business School in 1989.

== Career ==
Miquelon spent 16 years with Procter & Gamble, working at the company’s headquarters in Cincinnati, as well as a combined 12 years at their international offices in Bangkok, Singapore, and Geneva. In Geneva, he served as the general manager and head of finance for Western Europe, a P&G division responsible for 30% of total P&G's sales. In 2006, he joined Tyson Foods, where he was executive vice president and CFO.

In June 2008, Miquelon joined Walgreens as senior vice president and CFO and was promoted to executive vice president in July 2009. While at Walgreens, Miquelon was heavily involved in the acquisition of e-commerce company Drugstore.com, the purchase of the New York City drugstore chain Duane Reade, and the two-step transaction to acquire and merge with Alliance Boots. He, along with other executive leadership, was also involved in the development of a partnership with the blood-testing company Theranos. He continued to support Theranos founder Elizabeth Holmes even after the Wall Street Journal exposed the company as a fraud, referring to Theranos critics as "haters" and claiming she was "going to help so many people in [her] lifetime it’s absurd." In The Dropout, a 2022 Hulu miniseries about Theranos, Miquelon is portrayed by Josh Pais. He left Walgreens in 2014 and filed a defamation suit over media reports of being pushed out due to miscalculating an earnings forecast.

In 2019, he was named president and CEO of Jo-Ann Stores after joining the retailer in 2016 as executive vice president and CFO. On May 9, 2023, it was announced that Miquelon had abruptly resigned from his positions at Jo-Ann, effective the day prior.

Since 2013, Miquelon has been a member of the board of directors for Acadia Healthcare (ACHC). He is also a member of the National 4-H Council.

== Personal life ==
In September 2009, he was arrested for DUI in Glencoe, Illinois, and again one year later in Kenilworth, Illinois.
