= Biotechnology Advances =

- Discipline: Biotechnology
- Language: English
- Edited by: M. Moo-Young

Publication details
- History: 1983-present
- Publisher: Elsevier
- Frequency: Bimonthly
- Impact factor: 14.227 (2020)

Standard abbreviations
- ISO 4: Biotechnol. Adv.

Indexing
- CODEN: BIADDD
- ISSN: 0734-9750 (print); 1873-1899 (web)
- LCCN: 84640936
- OCLC no.: 08838531

Links
- Journal homepage; Online access

Biotechnology Advances is a peer-reviewed scientific journal which focuses on the biotechnology principles and industry applications of research in agriculture, medicine, and the environment.

== Abstracting and indexing ==
The journal is abstracted and indexed in BIOSIS Previews, CAB Abstracts, Chemical Abstracts, Current Contents/Agriculture, Biology & Environmental Sciences, EMBASE, Science Citation Index, and Scopus. According to the Journal Citation Reports, the journal has a 2020 impact factor of 14.227 .
