= The Journal of Molecular Diagnostics =

The Journal of Molecular Diagnostics is a peer-reviewed medical journal covering research on molecular biological applications to diagnostics (molecular diagnostics). It is published by Elsevier on behalf of the American Society for Investigative Pathology and the Association for Molecular Pathology. The editor-in-chief is Ronald M. Przygodzki, MD (US Department of Veterans Affairs). The journal was established in 1999 as The American Journal of Pathology, Part B, with Nelson Fausto (University of Washington) as founding editor.

According to the Journal Citation Reports, the journal has a 2021 impact factor of 5.341.

== Editors ==
The following persons have been editors-in-chief of the journal:

- 1999-2000: Nelson Fausto
- 1999-2009: Karen L. Kaul
- 2010-2014: Timothy J. O'Leary
- 2015-2022: Barbara Zehnbauer
- 2022-2027: Ronald M. Przygodzki
