= The Dropout (podcast) =

2019 American true crime podcast

- Season 2 cover art—The Dropout: Elizabeth Holmes on Trial
- Genre: Investigative journalism; true crime
- Country of origin: United States
- Language: English

Creative team
- Written by: Taylor Dunn; Rebecca Jarvis; Victoria Thompson

Cast and voices
- Hosted by: Rebecca Jarvis

Music
- Theme music composed by: Evan Viola

Production
- Production: Taylor Dunn; Rebecca Jarvis; Victoria Thompson
- Length: variable (39–81 minutes)

Technical specifications
- Audio format: Podcast (via streaming or downloadable MP3)

Publication
- No. of seasons: 2
- No. of episodes: 30
- Original release: January 15, 2019 – November 18, 2022
- Provider: ABC News

Related
- Adaptations: The Dropout (TV miniseries)
- Website: abcaudio.com/podcasts/the-dropout/

The Dropout is an American true crime podcast hosted by Rebecca Jarvis that follows the story of Elizabeth Holmes, her defunct medical company Theranos, and the related federal criminal fraud trial, United States v. Elizabeth A. Holmes, et al. It was produced by ABC News, Taylor Dunn, Victoria Thompson, and Rebecca Jarvis. After the initial six episodes of the podcast aired in 2019, a two-hour 20/20 television episode premiered in March 2019. A second season of the podcast, titled The Dropout: Elizabeth Holmes on Trial, was initiated in 2021 to cover the court case as it developed.

The podcast series received favorable reviews, and won a Front Page Award, an iHeartRadio Podcast Award, an Edward R. Murrow Award, and two Webby Awards for Best Podcast. The 20/20 television episode based on the podcast was nominated for a news Emmy Award in the Outstanding Feature Story in a Newsmagazine category.

In March 2022, the podcast was adapted into a limited television series, The Dropout, starring Oscar-nominee Amanda Seyfried as Holmes. Jarvis, Dunn, and Thompson served as executive producers along with showrunner Elizabeth Meriwether. The series received a positive reception and garnered multiple honors including a Critics' Choice Television Award and Producers Guild of America Award for Best Limited Series. Seyfried won a Golden Globe Award and Primetime Emmy Award for her portrayal of Holmes.

== Background ==
Holmes dropped out of Stanford University in 2003 and founded Theranos, a medical technology company. She soon became the world's youngest female self-made billionaire. The company was valued at approximately $9 billion. The company claimed that it could complete a full range of blood tests with a single drop of blood, testing for hundreds of diseases. Theranos sold its blood-testing technology to Walgreens. The U.S. Securities and Exchange Commission later charged Holmes with defrauding investors. In June 2018, Holmes was indicted on 11 counts of felony fraud in the U.S. federal criminal fraud trial, United States v. Elizabeth A. Holmes, et al.

== Production ==
=== Research and reporting ===
The series was produced by ABC News. The podcast was written and reported by Jarvis, along with ABC News senior producer Victoria Thompson and Taylor Dunn. Jarvis, Thompson, and Dunn served as producers of the podcast.

The book Bad Blood: Secrets and Lies in a Silicon Valley Startup by journalist and author John Carreyrou formed the initial basis for the podcast. To expand on the book's findings, Jarvis and her team interviewed former employees, investors, and Theranos patients. The team spent three years conducting detailed original research on the Theranos fraud. For the second season, Jarvis attended the federal trial of Holmes, United States v. Elizabeth A. Holmes, et al., at the Phillip Burton Federal Building in San Francisco, California.

=== Deposition tapes ===
Jarvis and her team gained access to legal deposition tapes of Holmes and key individuals involved in the Theranos fraud case. These depositions had not previously been publicized before the podcast release. Jarvis selected excerpts of the deposition to be played on the podcast, featuring statements by Holmes, Theranos president and COO Sunny Balwani, and several Theranos board members including the former Wells Fargo CEO Richard Kovacevich, the former US Chief of Naval Operations Gary Roughead, and the former US Senator and medical doctor Bill Frist.

=== Interviews ===
Jarvis hosted and narrated the podcast. She conducted interviews with medical patients that had been tested using the Theranos device. Jarvis landed an exclusive interview with Jeff Coopersmith, the lawyer for Balwani. Jarvis interviewed former Theranos board member Avie Tevanian, who was previously a high-ranking executive at Apple. Jarvis interviewed multiple Theranos employees, focusing especially on laboratory staff. She discussed the experience of working at the company with whistleblower Tyler Shultz, the grandson of Theranos board member and former US Secretary of State, George Shultz.

== Release ==
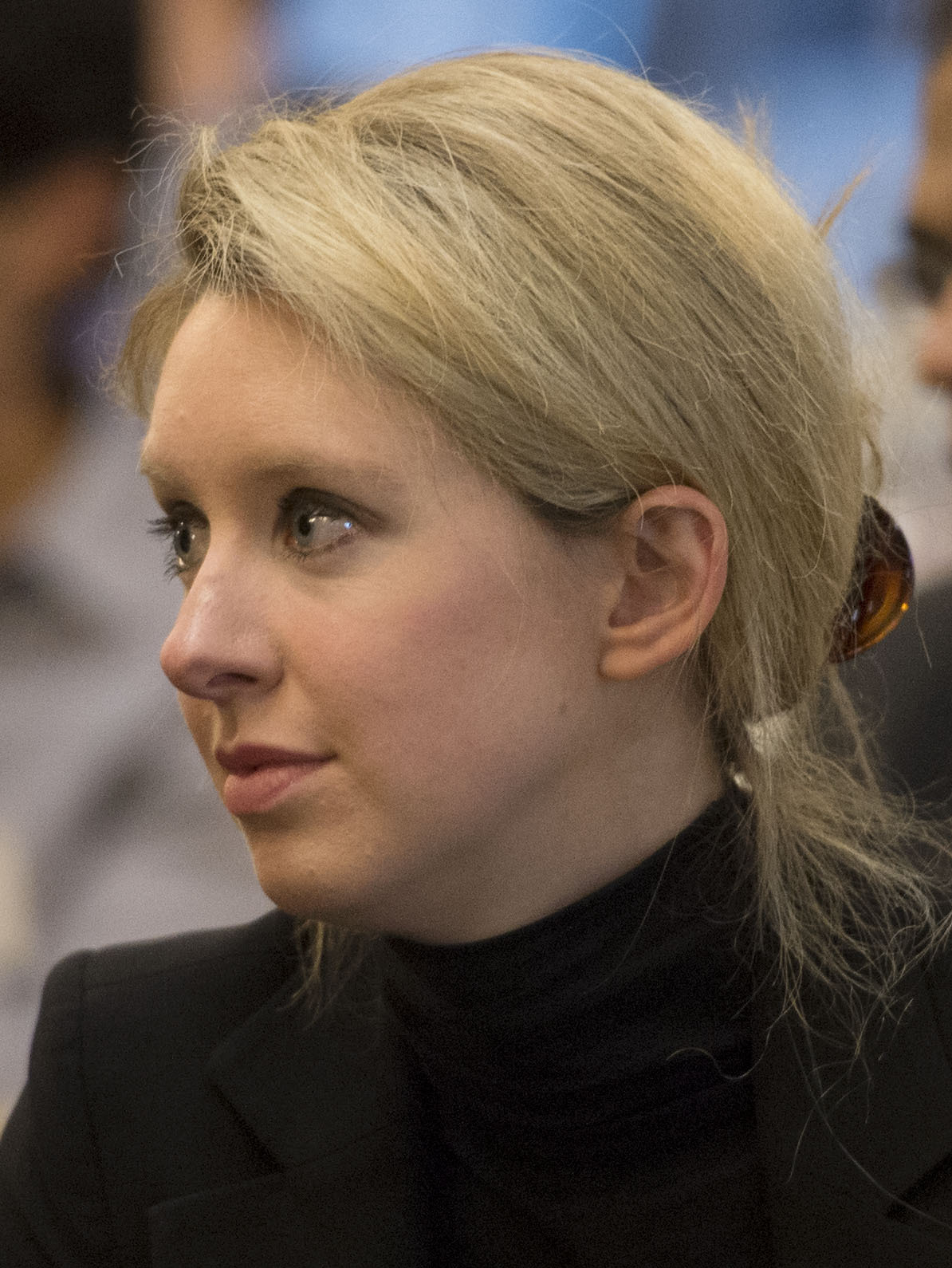
Elizabeth Holmes in 2013, eight years before her fraud trial began

The podcast series launched in January 2019 with six episodes. It was made available on the ABC News app, along with other apps including Stitcher, Spotify, TuneIn, Google Podcasts, and Apple Podcasts. During this time, Jarvis appeared on ABC World News Tonight and Nightline to report on her podcast research.

The Dropout was the number one ranked most popular podcast launched by ABC News. It was also among the top ranked podcasts on iTunes in March 2019.

After the initial 2019 six-episode edition, a two-hour 20/20 episode premiered in March 2019, harnessing the popularity of the podcast. It was nominated for a news Emmy Award in the Outstanding Feature Story in a Newsmagazine category.

The second season of The Dropout opened at the end of August 2021 with two new episodes, and was timed to follow the federal criminal fraud case, United States v. Elizabeth A. Holmes, et al. This season was titled The Dropout: Elizabeth Holmes on Trial. Further episodes arrived at the rate of one per week. They were made available to listeners on the ABC News app, Audacy, TuneIn, Stitcher, iHeartRadio, Google Podcasts, Amazon Music, Spotify, and Apple Podcasts. A major episode of the podcast was released on January 4, 2022, one day after Holmes was found guilty of fraud and conspiracy. This revelation was expected to conclude season two after 20 episodes.

During the course of season two, Jarvis regularly reported on the trial for ABC News, Good Morning America, and Nightline. Jarvis enlisted the help of law scholars, Theranos medical patients, and Holmes' prior business associates to provide commentary.

On March 4, 2022, ABC News released a special two-hour-long 20/20 television episode with reporting by Jarvis, covering the federal fraud trial of Holmes. The 20/20 investigative journalism piece by Jarvis was titled: The Drop Out – The Rise and Con of Elizabeth Holmes. It focused on personal developments in Holmes' life including her new partner, an heir to a hotel business, and it presented her accusation of domestic abuse against her former partner Sunny Balwani along with his denial.

ABC News released a bonus episode of the podcast The Dropout: Elizabeth Holmes on Trial, on August 11, 2022, titled: "Amanda and The Other Liz". It featured an interview by Jarvis with Amanda Seyfried, the actress portraying Elizabeth Holmes in the television miniseries, along with showrunner Elizabeth Meriwether. A second bonus episode of the podcast was released in November 2022 after Holmes was sentenced to more than 11 years of federal prison.

== Episodes ==
=== Season 1 ===
The first season debuted with a promotional trailer on January 15, 2019, followed by the first full episode one week later. It concluded with the sixth episode on February 26, 2019.

No.	Title	Length (minutes:seconds)	Original release date
0	"Trailer: The Rise and Fall of Elizabeth Holmes' Theranos"	2:00	January 15, 2019
1	"Myth Making"	47:31	January 22, 2019
2	"The Enforcer"	40:23	January 29, 2019
3	"A Star Is Born"	43:42	February 5, 2019
4	"The Whistleblower"	44:46	February 12, 2019
5	"The Downfall"	42:47	February 19, 2019
6	"What Now?"	39:12	February 26, 2019

=== Season 2 ===
The second season began with a trailer released on August 5, 2021, followed by the first full episode of the second season on August 31. The second season was declared complete in January 2022, but additional bonus episodes extended the season to November 18, 2022.

No.	Title	Length (minutes:seconds)	Original release date
0	"Introducing 'The Dropout: Elizabeth Holmes on Trial'"	3:00	August 5, 2021
1	"Where Have You Been, Elizabeth Holmes?"	41:00	August 31, 2021
2	"Bombshell"	47:00	August 31, 2021
3	"The Jury"	29:00	September 7, 2021
4	"Setting the Stage"	43:00	September 14, 2021
5	"Mystery Men"	37:00	September 21, 2021
6	"The General and the Patient"	37:00	September 28, 2021
7	"Sounding the Alarm"	38:00	October 5, 2021
8	"Crime and Punishment"	32:00	October 12, 2021
9	"The Clients"	43:00	October 19, 2021
10	"The Therabros"	39:00	October 26, 2021
11	"The Investors"	45:00	November 5, 2021
12	"Patterns"	41:00	November 9, 2021
13	"The Beginning of the End"	46:00	November 16, 2021
14	"The Prosecution Rests & Elizabeth Speaks"	64:00	November 23, 2021
15	"Reframing the Narrative"	53:00	November 30, 2021
16	"Accusations and Evasions"	74:00	December 7, 2021
17	"The Defense Rests"	57:00	December 14, 2021
18	"Bombshell"	47:00	August 31, 2021
19	"Closing Arguments"	76:00	December 21, 2021
20	"The Verdict"	48:00	January 5, 2022
21	"'20/20': The Rise and Con of Elizabeth Holmes"	81:00	March 6, 2022
22	"The Sunny Balwani Verdict"	6:00	July 8, 2022
23	"Bonus: Amanda and The Other Liz"	48:00	August 11, 2022
24	"Bonus: Sentenced"	8:00	November 18, 2022

== Miniseries adaptation ==
The success of the podcast led to it being developed into a television miniseries. The podcast was adapted to create the miniseries The Dropout, starring Oscar-nominee Amanda Seyfried as Holmes. Jarvis, Dunn, and Thompson served as executive producers along with showrunner Elizabeth Meriwether. The television miniseries drew upon material from the first season of the podcast.

Meriwether began with the Jarvis podcast in order to build a character study of Elizabeth Holmes. Meriweather listened to the podcast and attempted to conceive how Holmes might behave when she was out of the public eye. She explained to The New York Times her attempt to understand and delve into the character of Holmes: "I felt like people's understanding of who she was had been limited to the deep voice and the turtleneck. I was interested in going deeper, and I felt like Rebecca's podcast was made with that spirit of wanting to figure out what motivated her." Television director Michael Showalter also listened to the podcast to gain context for the miniseries.

Actress Amanda Seyfried was already a podcast listener prior to being cast as Holmes in the miniseries. She assessed the podcast: "There's something very calming about Rebecca. There's something very fair about Rebecca and her journalism, the way she speaks about things, the way she articulates them, the questions she asks. The whole team of them did an amazing job."

The miniseries was released on Hulu in March 2022. The series received a positive reception from critic reviews. It garnered an 89% positive score on review aggregator website Rotten Tomatoes, and a 75% rating on Metacritic. The TV miniseries was recognized with multiple awards, including a Critics' Choice Television Award for Best Limited Series, and a Producers Guild of America Award for Best Limited Series. Seyfried won multiple awards for her portrayal of Holmes based on the podcast—including a Golden Globe Award for Best Actress – Limited or Anthology Series or Television Film, and a Primetime Emmy Award for Outstanding Lead Actress in a Limited or Anthology Series or Movie.

== Reception ==
=== Critical response ===
In a review of the podcast for The Verge, journalist Andrew Liptak commented, "the series has provided a good overview, aided by interviews and audio from the people who worked there." Time reporter Hannah Lynn wrote, "While many podcasts have had singular episodes about Elizabeth Holmes, The Dropout is the definitive audio documentary that tracks the rise and fall of Theranos." Common Sense Media gave the podcast a favorable review: "Every inch of the Theranos downfall is covered in this podcast, making it intriguing, informational, and shocking all at once." Jake Greenberg of Podcast Review called it "a Bulletproof Retelling of the Theranos Scandal". Greenberg wrote, "The Dropout is investigative through and through". Author Susie Orman Schnall called the production, "Rebecca Jarvis' fascinating podcast". Robert M. McManus, Stanley J. Ward, and Alexandra K. Perry noted the work was a good journalistic resource on the topic of Theranos, in their book on Ethical Leadership. Gerard Cockburn wrote for The Adelaide Advertiser, "Documenting the collapse of Theranos, a prominent medical tech start-up which made CEO Elizabeth Holmes America's youngest female self-made billionaire, The Dropout is a gripping tale of the boom and bust nature of America's tech industry." He called the podcast a "gripping account", and an "enthralling tale of a modern day boomtown antics." Cockburn concluded, "This podcast is well worth the listen, engrossing you in a tale of lies and deception and rorts in the American tech industry."

Phoebe Luckhurst reviewed the podcast for the Evening Standard, and wrote that Jarvis had, "done an exhaustive job in charting Holmes's incredible rise and consequent disgrace, including interviews with those who observed her at close range, and never before aired testimony from Holmes." Luckhurst characterized the production: "It's an astonishing expose lies, damned lies and Silicon Valley hubris." Fiona Sturges of the Financial Times wrote of her need to complete the series quickly: "All of which is to say that, in listening to The Dropout, I am late to the party. But over the past week I have inhaled the entire series, bathing in its addictive narrative of greed, ambition and duplicity." Of the research that went into the podcast series, Sturges wrote that Jarvis: "is fastidious in her approach, exhaustively chasing down Theranos's employees, board members and investors, illustrating how they got drawn in to such a dishonest and doomed enterprise." Patricia Nicol reviewed the podcast for The Sunday Times, and highlighted it among, "17 Podcasts for Packed Commutes". Nicol called it: "an assured, well-connected guide to the spectacular fall from grace of 'the world's youngest self-made female billionaire', once hailed as a Silicon Valley visionary." She said the podcast was addictive due to schaudenfreude.

Erin Bury wrote for Quill, "Based on the book Bad Blood, which is well worth reading before or after you listen, The Dropout podcast weaves Holmes’s story into a compelling narrative through interviews with key players, past media interviews, and depositions." Bury concluded: "By the end of it you can’t decide if Holmes is a mad genius or the world’s biggest con artist—but either way, it’s one hell of a story." Alison Foreman of Mashable wrote, "The Dropout is the most comprehensive Theranos-centered podcast on the market." She observed, "this six-part series tackles Holmes' downfall from multiple angles and with meticulous detail." Foreman concluded, "If you're looking for the most complete Theranos narrative with the most informational value, The Dropout is your best bet." Writing for The Courier-Mail, Sarah Matthews commented, "The Dropout is the result of a three-year investigation by US journalist Rebecca Jarvis, and is a fascinating insight into the pressures of Silicon Valley and how one charismatic visionary managed to fool so many people for so long."

Writing for The Herald-Sun, journalist Glenn McDonald commented, "In a podcast environment where opinion reigns—and louder is mistaken for better—The Dropout is a rock-solid example of straight, no-nonsense investigative journalism." McDonald observed, "The Dropout is one of the most definitive accounts of the Theranos scandal". Danielle Stephens reviewed the podcast for The Guardian, and wrote that the series, "leaves you wondering; how on earth did this scam go on for so long? And when does ambition become dangerous?" Writing about the quality of the production, Stephens said: "The story is expertly told and left me feeling personally aggrieved by a woman I have never met. Not just for her scheme, but for the damage it has done to the idea that a woman could be the next Steve Jobs in an industry dominated by men." A review of the second season in The Guardian wrote, "episodes expertly dissect the live-time trial happenings with thrilling exclusive interviews." The Guardian noted that Rebecca Jarvis, "takes the listener through a gripping, multi-year investigation". A subsequent article in the newspaper called the podcast a "riveting series".

=== Accolades ===
Year	Award	Category	Organization	Result	Ref.
2019	Front Page Award	In-Depth Reporting	Newswomen's Club of New York	Won	
2019	Discover Pods Award	True Crime Podcast	Discover Pods	Nominated	
2020	iHeartRadio Podcast Awards	Podcast of the Year	iHeartRadio	Won	
2020	Edward R. Murrow Award	Podcast of the Year	Radio Television Digital News Association	Won	
2020	Webby Awards	Best Mini Series Podcast	International Academy of Digital Arts and Sciences	Nominated	
2020	Webby Awards	Podcasts: Best Individual Episode—Episode 5: "The Downfall"	International Academy of Digital Arts and Sciences	Nominated	
2022	Webby Awards	People's Voice	International Academy of Digital Arts and Sciences	Won	
2022	Webby Awards	Best Podcast of the Year	International Academy of Digital Arts and Sciences	Won	
2022	Webby Awards	Crime & Justice Podcast	International Academy of Digital Arts and Sciences	Nominated	

== See also ==
- List of American crime podcasts
- List of podcast adaptations
