= Avie Tevanian =

American software engineer (born 1961)

- Born: Avadis Tevanian Jr. 1961 (age 64–65)
- Education: University of Rochester (BA); Carnegie Mellon University (MS, PhD)
- Known for: Co-architect of Mach, NeXTSTEP, and macOS

Avadis "Avie" Tevanian Jr. (born 1961) is an American software engineer who helped develop the Mach operating system kernel while a doctoral student at Carnegie Mellon University. He joined NeXT, founded by Steve Jobs, as vice president of software engineering, where he applied his work on Mach to the development of the company's NeXTSTEP operating system. Following Apple's acquisition of NeXT in 1997, Tevanian became senior vice president of software engineering at Apple, where he led the development of the Mac OS X operating system, based on NeXTSTEP. He was Apple's chief software technology officer from 2003 to 2006. He left the company on March 31, 2006 and has since served on the board of directors for several companies.

== Early life ==
Tevanian is from Westbrook, Maine. He is of Armenian descent. Tevanian cloned the 1980s arcade game Missile Command, giving it the same name in a version for the Xerox Alto, and Mac Missiles! for the Macintosh platform. He has a B.A. degree in mathematics from the University of Rochester and M.S. and Ph.D. degrees in computer science from Carnegie Mellon University. There, he was a principal designer and engineer of the Mach operating system, along with Richard Rashid.

== Career ==
=== NeXT Inc. ===
He was Vice President of Software Engineering at NeXT Inc. and was responsible for managing NeXT's software engineering department. There, he designed the NeXTSTEP operating system, based upon his previous academic work on Mach.

=== Apple Inc. ===
He was senior vice president of software engineering at Apple from 1997 to 2003, and then chief software technology officer from 2003 to 2006. There, he redesigned NeXTSTEP to become Mac OS X (later renamed OS X and then macOS), which became iOS.

In United States v. Microsoft in 2001, he was a witness for the United States Department of Justice, testifying against Microsoft.

In 2001, Bertrand Serlet and Tevanian initiated a secret project at the request of Steve Jobs, to sell Mac OS X on Vaio laptops. Apple demonstrated the product to Sony executives at a golf party in Hawaii, with the most expensive Vaio they could acquire. Sony refused, arguing Vaio's sales had just started to grow after years of difficulties.

=== Theranos and Dolby Labs ===
Tevanian left Apple on March 31, 2006, and joined the boards of both Dolby Labs and Theranos, Inc. He resigned from the board of Theranos in late 2007, with an acrimonious ending as he faced legal threats and was forced to waive his right to buy a company co-founder's shares, actions he believed were in retaliation for the skepticism he was often alone in expressing about the company's finances and progress in developing its technology at board meetings.

In 2019, Tevanian gave a wide-ranging interview on his time at Theranos for a six-part podcast series called The Dropout, produced by ABC News. In the interview, he said: "I had seen so many things that were bad go on. I would never expect anyone would behave the way that she [Elizabeth Holmes] behaved as a CEO. And believe me, I worked for Steve Jobs. I saw some crazy things. But Elizabeth took it to a new level.”

=== Other roles ===
In May 2006, he joined the board of Tellme Networks, which was later sold to Microsoft.

On January 12, 2010, he became managing director of Elevation Partners.

In July 2015, he cofounded NextEquity Partners and as of 2017 is serving as Managing Director.
