= Analytical Biochemistry =

- Discipline: Biochemistry
- Language: English
- Edited by: William Jakoby

Publication details
- History: 1960–present
- Publisher: Elsevier
- Frequency: Biweekly
- Impact factor: 2.219 (2014)

Standard abbreviations
- ISO 4: Anal. Biochem.

Indexing
- CODEN: ANBCA2
- ISSN: 0003-2697 (print); 1096-0309 (web)
- OCLC no.: 01481077

Links
- Journal homepage; Online access

Analytical Biochemistry is a peer-reviewed scientific journal established in 1960. It covers the field of biochemistry. According to the Journal Citation Reports, the journal has a 2014 impact factor of 2.219.

== Abstracting and Indexing ==
The journal is abstracted and indexed in Analytical Abstracts, Biological Abstracts, Chemical Abstracts, Current Contents/Life Sciences, EMBASE, EMBiology, MEDLINE, Science Citation Index, and Scopus.
