= Rebecca Jarvis =

American TV journalist and ABC News correspondent

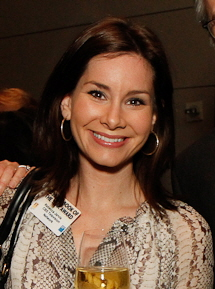
- Jarvis in 2012
- Born: Rebecca Ann Jarvis; September 28, 1981 (age 45); Minneapolis, Minnesota, U.S.
- Education: University of Chicago (BA)
- Years active: 2003–present
- Spouse: Matthew Hanson (m. 2012)
- Children: 2
- Website: Official website

Rebecca Ann Jarvis (born September 28, 1981) is an American journalist and former investment banker. She is the chief business, economics, and technology correspondent for ABC News, the host, creator, and managing editor of Real Biz with Rebecca Jarvis and the host of the podcasts No Limits with Rebecca Jarvis and The Dropout. She was a finalist on season 4 of The Apprentice.

== Early life ==
Jarvis is a daughter of Gail (née Marks) Jarvis and James T. Jarvis. Her father is a lawyer and business consultant in Chicago. Her mother is the Chicago Tribune's nationally syndicated financial columnist. Jarvis graduated from St. Paul Academy and Summit School in 1999 and the University of Chicago in 2003, studying economics and Law, Letters, and Society. She studied international economics and business in Paris at Sciences Po and Paris Dauphine University.

Jarvis was one of Teen People's "20 Teens Who Will Change the World" in February 2000. She was honored for raising over $750,000 for her own non-profit children's charity—a project that also involved Al Gore and Colin Powell, which she set up at 15. She was also named as a "Point of Light" for her advocacy of disenfranchised children and teens. During high school, Jarvis worked with the National Youth Leadership Council on their Youth Project Team, getting one of the few interviews granted by then Secretary of State Colin Powell while serving as an NYLC Youth Reporter at National Youth Summits.

== The Apprentice ==
On the second week of The Apprentice 4, Jarvis broke her ankle while playing hockey as a task-winning reward. She was on crutches for the rest of the competition, which took 39 days to tape in the spring of 2005, but was fully able to walk by the time of the live season finale seven months later. On the season finale of the show, Randal Pinkett was hired. Donald Trump asked Pinkett if he should hire Jarvis as well; Pinkett replied that he should be the only Apprentice since he was the winner.

== Professional career ==
Jarvis was a short-term interest rate trader on Citigroup's foreign exchange desk in London. She later worked at Banc of America Securities in Chicago as an investment banking analyst.

Jarvis has worked in both investment banking and foreign currency trading, but left financial services to pursue a career in journalism. She has written for publications including Crain's Chicago Business and Business 2.0. She is currently a governor on the board of the Society of American Business Editors and Writers.

On March 7, 2006, the business news channel CNBC announced it would be hiring Jarvis as an associate reporter. She was a general assignment reporter based at CNBC's world headquarters, and covered NASDAQ and the NYMEX. She last appeared on CNBC on September 18, 2009. On October 21, 2009, TVNewser quoted CNBC spokesman Brian Steel as confirming that "Rebecca is no longer with CNBC, and we wish her the best."

Jarvis joined CBS News, primarily as a financial reporter, starting on April 1, 2010, and later became the co-anchor of CBS This Morning Saturday, as well as Business and Economics Correspondent for CBS News. On the March 30, 2013, broadcast of CBS This Morning Saturday, she announced that she was leaving CBS News, but did not say where she was going. On April 2, it was announced she was joining ABC News later that month. She has worked as the Chief Business and Economics Correspondent of ABC since.

Currently Jarvis is the Chief Business, Technology and Economics Correspondent for ABC News and the Host, Creator and Managing Editor of Real Biz with Rebecca Jarvis. She reports for all ABC News programs and platforms including Good Morning America, ABC World News Tonight, Nightline, 20/20, and This Week with George Stephanopoulos.

In 2017 Jarvis launched a new podcast with ABC News Radio, No Limits with Rebecca Jarvis. In January 2019, Jarvis, in conjunction with ABC Radio and ABC Nightline, became the host of a podcast called "The Dropout" which documents the rise and fall of Theranos and Elizabeth Holmes.

=== Recognition ===
Year	Title
2000	Point of Light Award winner #1098
2000	"20 Teens Who Will Change the World" by Teen People magazine
2002 2003	Recipient of the University of Chicago Dean's Grant
2012	A recipient of the Women in Numbers Award by The Alliance for Women in Media
2013	Alfred I. DuPont-Columbia Award: 48 Hours CBS News Prime Time Special: Newtown
2014	Daytime Emmy for Outstanding Morning Show – Good Morning America
2015	Nominated Daytime Emmy for Outstanding Morning Show – Good Morning America
2016	Nominated Daytime Emmy for Outstanding Morning Show – Good Morning America
2017	Daytime Emmy for Outstanding Morning Show – Good Morning America
2019	Early Career Achievement Award – UChicago Alumni Association

She received an Emmy award in 2023.

== Personal life ==
Jarvis married Matthew Hanson on January 28, 2012, at McNamara Alumni Center in Minnesota. Rabbi Barry Axler officiated the ceremony with the bridegroom's father, the Rev. Craig Hanson, the lead pastor at Roseville Lutheran Church in Roseville, Minnesota, taking part. They are both graduates of University of Chicago and worked together at Banc of America Securities in Chicago. They have a daughter named Isabel, born on February 20, 2019. They also have a son named Leo born in 2023.
