= Sunny Balwani =

Former president and COO of Theranos (born 1965)

- Born: Ramesh Balwani; June 13, 1965 (age 61); Sindh, Pakistan
- Education: University of Texas at Austin (BS); University of California, Berkeley (MBA); Stanford University (attended)
- Status: Incarcerated since April 20, 2023
- Convictions: 2 counts of conspiracy, 6 counts of defrauding investors and 4 counts of patient fraud (2022)
- Penalty: 12 years and 11 months
- Accomplice: Elizabeth Holmes (2003–2016)

Details
- Imprisoned at: Federal Correctional Institution, Lompoc II

Ramesh "Sunny" Balwani (born June 13, 1965) is a businessman who was the former president and chief operating officer of Theranos, which was a privately held health technology company founded by his then-girlfriend Elizabeth Holmes. He and Holmes fraudulently represented that they had devised a revolutionary blood test that required only small amounts of blood, such as from a fingerstick. Starting in 2015, Theranos came under criticism in the media due to its questionable claims and practices. The consequences of the fraud led to the collapse of Theranos, while private investors lost $700M to $945M in real money. The company was eventually liquidated.

Balwani and Holmes were criminally charged by federal authorities for operating the business as a multi-million dollar scheme to defraud investors and patients. Holmes was found guilty and sentenced to 11 years and 3 months in prison. Balwani was found guilty on all counts, and was sentenced to 12 years and 11 months plus three years of probation. He surrendered on April 20, 2023. Holmes and Balwani were further ordered to pay $452 million to the victims of the fraud, with responsibility for the payment shared between them.

== Early life ==
Ramesh Balwani was born in Sindh, West Pakistan, into an upper middle-class Sindhi Hindu farming family. He attended Aitchison College, a prestigious boarding school in Lahore, until 1984. Balwani speaks Sindhi, Urdu, Hindi and English.

His family eventually moved to India "because being a Hindu in a mostly all-Muslim country of Pakistan was very difficult" according to Balwani's personal lawyer. Later they immigrated to the United States. In the Spring 1987 semester, Balwani began undergraduate studies at the University of Texas at Austin as an international student where he was a member of the Pakistani Students Association. "He was very patriotically Pakistani," said one friend of Balwani's at the time, "He was one of us." Balwani left the campus sometime after 1991 to begin working; he would eventually get a bachelor's degree in information systems in 1997.

Despite research into the question by The New York Times, it is unknown when, or why, he took the nickname "Sunny". In official documents from the late 1990s and on divorce papers from 2002, he was known as Ramesh, his given name. By 2012, he was signing papers at Theranos as Sunny Balwani.

== Career ==
In the 1990s, Balwani worked for Lotus Development and Microsoft. During Balwani's tenure at Microsoft he worked in sales. He claims to have written thousands of lines of code. However, independent investigations could not verify this, and numerous Microsoft managers who were asked about him could not remember him. While at Microsoft, he met a Japanese artist, Keiko Fujimoto, who became his wife.

In late 1999, he joined CommerceBid.com as president. It was a software development company that helped businesses buy and sell items via auctions over the burgeoning Internet. In 1999, the company was purchased by Commerce One, another business development software company with a high valuation. The buyout was done entirely with stock, and Balwani joined the board of the new company. In July 2000, Balwani sold his shares in Commerce One, netting nearly $40 million shortly before the company went out of business, just before the dot com bubble burst. He went back to school at the Haas School of Business at University of California, Berkeley for a Master of Business Administration, when he met Elizabeth Holmes in 2002 during a trip to Beijing as part of Stanford University's Mandarin program. Holmes was 18 and in her senior year of high school at the time, and Balwani was 37; Holmes would later pursue an undergraduate degree in chemical engineering at Stanford, then later drop out to focus full-time on Theranos. Balwani graduated from the Haas School of Business in 2003. He spent another four years in a computer science graduate program at Stanford University, but dropped out in 2008. He would join Theranos soon after, when its board threatened to "replace Holmes with somebody more experienced" and she promised to bring Balwani in instead.

== Theranos ==
Theranos logo

Balwani joined Theranos in 2009. He ran the company's day-to-day operations as its president. He had no training in biological sciences or medical devices, which became an issue due to the absence of medical experts on the company's board of directors and Balwani's behavior. He was described by former Theranos employees as overbearing, uncompromising, and so concerned about industrial espionage that he verged on paranoia.

Within Theranos, Balwani was known for using technical terms he seemingly did not understand in what others believed were attempts to appear more knowledgeable. He once misheard "end effector" (the claw or other device at the end of an automated robot's arm) as "endofactor" (a nonsense word) and repeated the error throughout a meeting. He failed to notice when "Endofactor" was subsequently used as a prank in a PowerPoint presentation.

The Wall Street Journal reported in October 2015 that the Edison blood testing device sold by Theranos produced inaccurate medical diagnoses and results. Edison machines frequently failed quality-control checks and produced widely varied results, a finding that was corroborated in a report released in March 2016 by the federal Centers for Medicare and Medicaid Services (CMS). In April 2016, Theranos told regulators it had voided all test results from Edison machines for 2014 and 2015, as well as some other tests it ran on conventional machines.

In January 2016, the CMS sent a warning letter to Theranos after inspecting its laboratory in Newark, California. CMS regulators proposed a two-year ban on Balwani from owning or operating a blood lab after the company failed to address problems at its California lab in March 2016.

In 2018, the Securities and Exchange Commission (SEC) charged Theranos with fraud. The SEC said, among other things, that Balwani and Holmes had claimed the company's technology was being used by the U.S. Department of Defense in combat situations. Another false claim included claiming a $100 million revenue stream in 2014 that was actually $100,000. Balwani departed from his position at Theranos in May 2016.

== Legal proceedings ==
=== SEC fraud charges ===
In March 2018, Balwani and Holmes were charged by the SEC with securities fraud, "raising more than $700 million from investors through an elaborate, years-long fraud in which they exaggerated or made false statements about the company's technology, business, and financial performance". Holmes settled the case out of court without admitting or denying wrongdoing, but Balwani was still in litigation as of 2022. He said he was innocent of the charges.

=== United States v. Ramesh "Sunny" Balwani ===
On June 15, 2018, following an investigation by the U.S. Attorney's Office in San Francisco that lasted more than two years, a federal grand jury indicted president Balwani and CEO Holmes on nine counts of wire fraud and two counts of conspiracy to commit wire fraud. Prosecutors alleged that Holmes and Balwani engaged in two criminal schemes, one to defraud investors, the other to defraud patients. In March 2020, a U.S. District Court Judge ordered that Balwani would stand trial separately from Holmes. In January 2022, Holmes was found guilty on multiple counts of fraud.

On July 7, 2022, Balwani was found guilty on all counts and faced up to 20 years in prison and millions of dollars in restitution. He received a sentence of 12 years 11 months in prison, plus three years of probation on December 7, 2022. He was ordered to self-surrender by March 15, 2023, which a judge later amended to March 16. Balwani moved for appellate bail, but the judge denied his motion, citing a low likelihood of the appeal succeeding. Balwani later appealed this ruling, which triggered an automatic stay of his sentence. On April 7, 2023, the Ninth Circuit Court of Appeals refused Balwani's request, and a new self-surrender date was set for April 20. He surrendered on that date. In June 2026, Balwani petitioned the Supreme Court to review his case based on allegations of prosecutorial misconduct during the 2023 trial.

He was formerly incarcerated at Federal Correctional Institution, Terminal Island, in San Pedro, California, until its closure on June 13, 2026. He is currently incarcerated at Federal Correctional Institution, Lompoc II, in Lompoc, California. His expected release date according to officials from the Bureau of Prisons officials is April 11, 2034. In May 2023 during the restitution phase, Holmes and Balwani were ordered to pay $452 million to the victims of the fraud, with responsibility for the payment shared between them.

== Personal life ==
He was married to Japanese artist Keiko Fujimoto. Fujimoto and Balwani lived in San Francisco before their divorce in December 2002.

Balwani was in a romantic relationship with Elizabeth Holmes during his tenure at Theranos. He met Holmes in 2002 during a Stanford University Mandarin trip, when Holmes was 18; he was 19 years older than Holmes and married at the time. Their relationship was not disclosed to their Theranos investors. During her trial, Holmes testified that she had been raped while she was a student at Stanford and that she had sought solace from Balwani in the aftermath of the incident. She also claimed that during her romantic relationship with Balwani, which lasted more than a decade, he was a very controlling figure and that he berated and sexually abused her. In her court testimony, Holmes stated that Balwani wanted to "kill the person" she was and make her into a "new Elizabeth". However, she later testified that Balwani had not forced her to make the false statements to investors, business partners, journalists and company directors that had been described in the case. In court filings, Balwani has "categorically" denied abuse allegations, calling them "false and inflammatory".
