= You Can See Everything =

2026 documentary film

- Theatrical release poster
- Directed by: Nathan Fielder; Lance Oppenheim
- Produced by: Nathan Fielder; Lance Oppenheim; Tatiana Bears; Maggie Ambrose; Jack Davis
- Cinematography: David Bolen
- Edited by: Adam Locke-Norton
- Music by: Ari Balouzian
- Production companies: A24; To Be Formed; Blow Out Productions
- Distributed by: A24
- Release dates: September 6, 2026 (Telluride); October 16, 2026 (United States)
- Running time: 174 minutes
- Country: United States
- Language: English
- Budget: $7 million
- Box office: $99 million

You Can See Everything is a 2026 American experimental documentary film directed by Nathan Fielder and Lance Oppenheim. It follows Elizabeth Holmes, the founder of the defunct health technology company Theranos, and her partner Billy Evans, who invited a film crew to document them beginning in the weeks before Holmes began serving a United States federal prison sentence for defrauding investors.

The film premiered as a secret screening at the 53rd Telluride Film Festival on September 6, 2026, and was theatrically released by A24 on October 16. It received widespread acclaim from critics and has grossed $99 million against a $7 million production budget, becoming the 10th highest-grossing documentary film of all time.

== Synopsis ==
In April 2023, 34 days before Elizabeth Holmes begins her 11-year prison sentence for defrauding investors through her company Theranos, she and her partner Billy Evans invite filmmakers Nathan Fielder and Lance Oppenheim to document their lives at a rented beach house in Del Mar, California. Despite having extensive access to their personal lives, Fielder suspects them of withholding information. When Fielder questions Holmes about how she promoted Theranos's defective blood-testing device, she denies intentionally misleading anyone about its capabilities, claiming her words were semantically misinterpreted. Holmes and Evans call prospective investors about starting a new blood-testing company.

Fielder shows the couple the Abbott and Costello routine "Who's on First?" to demonstrate his frustrations in communicating with Holmes. Holmes says she finds it humorous, but admits to not understanding the joke when pressed by Fielder, which Evans claims exemplifies how she "thinks differently". Later, Fielder shows them The Dropout, a miniseries starring actress Amanda Seyfried as Holmes, but a distressed Holmes asks to stop watching. Shortly before her imprisonment, Holmes has her body 3D-scanned and expresses concern about her likeness being misused. Holmes reports to Federal Prison Camp, Bryan to begin her sentence. Evans and their two children subsequently relocate to Texas to be closer to her.

Filming resumes two years later, as Fielder follows Evans' development of his new company, Haemanthus. Evans exhibits behavior that concerns Fielder: he refuses to help Fielder speak with Holmes in prison, licenses Holmes's image for billboards and a deepfaked AI model, and abruptly ends Fielder's interview with a Haemanthus engineer who suggests Holmes lied about the Theranos device's capabilities.

Fielder meets with Seyfried and has her reprise her role as Holmes in dramatized reenactments of encounters during the making of the documentary which were not filmed. They reenact a meeting that occurred early in the project, in which Evans (portrayed by actor Christopher Abbott) requested a cut of the documentary's profit while Holmes was in another room. The filmmakers reluctantly negotiated a profit-sharing agreement with Evans, but Holmes later mentioned that she would receive no money from the documentary, raising suspicions regarding whether she knew of this deal.

Fielder and Seyfried find further examples of Evans controlling Holmes's public image, including impersonating her on X while saying things that Fielder and Seyfried believe she would never say. They confront Evans at his home, where Evans states that he holds power of attorney over Holmes, that most of his social media posts draw from emails she sends him from prison, and that she knows "some" details of his agreement with the filmmakers concerning the film's profits. He criticizes Seyfried for starring in The Dropout and for calling Charlie Kirk "hateful" following Kirk's assassination. He threatens to exact revenge on anyone who harmed Holmes, expresses concerns that he is being followed, and says that he always carries a gun.

Frustrated with Evans's interference, Fielder visits Holmes in prison and later reenacts the meeting with Seyfried. Fielder recounts that Holmes says she is being bullied in prison due to Seyfried's portrayal of her in The Dropout. Seyfried is taken aback by this, but she defends her portrayal and the dramatic license taken by the show. Holmes claims to approve of Evans's activities since her imprisonment, but remains vague about her knowledge of his financial decisions, which she admits she prefers to leave to his discretion because she owes hundreds of millions of dollars in restitution. Evans arrives with their children for their weekly visit, and he and Holmes tearfully embrace, which Fielder interprets as genuine affection. When Fielder starts to change the wording in his reenactment script, Seyfried suggests that Fielder has allowed his sympathy for Holmes to compromise his objectivity.

On-screen text reveals that Evans relinquished his profit-sharing agreement before the film's release. It also states that New York Times reporter Amy Chozick stands by (but does not provide evidence for) the remark she alleges Holmes made regarding The Dropout, which Holmes and Evans disputed: "They're not playing me. They're playing a character I created."

== Cast of subjects ==
- Elizabeth Holmes
- Nathan Fielder
- Billy Evans
- Amanda Seyfried
- Christian Holmes IV
- Noel Holmes
- William Evans
- Invicta Evans

=== Reenactments ===
- Nathan Fielder as himself
- Amanda Seyfried as Elizabeth Holmes, reprising her role from The Dropout
- Christopher Abbott as Billy Evans
- Lance Oppenheim as himself
- Phillip Andre Botello as A24 Executive
- Gary Wilmes as A24 Executive
- Manik Choksi as friend

== Production ==
=== Development ===
Directors Nathan Fielder (left) and Lance Oppenheim (right)

Oppenheim and Fielder first came into contact after Oppenheim learned Fielder had seen part of his 2020 documentary Some Kind of Heaven; Oppenheim, already a fan of Fielder's work, emailed him about it. The two became friends afterward and discussed the possibility of working together. They considered Toastmasters International as a subject for a project, going as far as to visit one of the organization's clubs in New York City, but abandoned the idea after they were unable to come up with an angle they liked.

In 2023 Fielder invited Oppenheim to the Magic Castle in Los Angeles, where someone called out Elizabeth Holmes's name in response to a magician's request for the name of a celebrity. Oppenheim remembered a rumor about Holmes asking A24 to document her life, and asked Fielder if he wanted to collaborate on such a project. According to Vanity Fair, Holmes was "[convinced] of her own innocence" after having been charged and sentenced for defrauding investors in 2022 and was "utterly certain that everyone else will believe her too, if only she has an opportunity to speak her truth". Fielder had read John Carreyrou's 2018 book Bad Blood and thought that the story had already been thoroughly covered in the media, but he became curious about Holmes's perspective following her retreat from the public eye.

=== Filming ===
In April 2023, Holmes and her partner Billy Evans invited the film crew to live at home with them and their children during the 34 days prior to Holmes beginning her prison sentence. Principal photography began at Holmes and Evans's rented beach house in Del Mar, California. A24 gave the filmmakers permission to pursue the project without a deadline or obligation to turn the footage into a finished film, with the studio saying that if nothing came of the project it could just be scrapped. According to Fielder, they knew they had a compelling story when crew members disagreed about what was happening in the house, saying: "And that's when we really realized, 'Oh, this is really interesting to follow this. We're all smart and we're really working at the top of our intelligence. Why can't we make sense of what's happening in this house?'"

The original plan was for Fielder to remain behind the camera, but the interactions Fielder had with Holmes and Evans were determined to be so strange that it was decided to include them in the film. According to Fielder, the filmmakers' relationship with Evans had deteriorated by the end of filming; Fielder recounted that "[n]ear the end of filming, Billy [Evans] was trying to exert a level of control over the project that made us uncomfortable, and communication with him sort of broke down because of that".

Fielder and Oppenheim also reached out to several people who knew Holmes or had worked with her, but were unable to get them to participate in the film. Fielder claimed "people did not want to appear in this, or people from the past were just sort of done with her." Later, Fielder's friend Emma Stone introduced him to actress Amanda Seyfried, who portrayed Holmes in the miniseries The Dropout. With Seyfried's permission, Fielder and Oppenheim filmed her reaction to the Del Mar footage. After Seyfried expressed an interest in playing Holmes again, Fielder and Oppenheim expanded the project's scope by having Seyfried portray Holmes in reenactments of the filmmakers' private conversations with Holmes and Evans. Seyfried appears in the documentary as herself, in her television role as Holmes, and in new reenactments as Holmes. Actor Christopher Abbott portrays Evans in the reenactments.

=== Music ===
Ari Balouzian, a frequent collaborator of Oppenheim's, composed the soundtrack for You Can See Everything. The soundtrack features 25 tracks which "help [to] build the film's uneasy atmosphere" and borrows from Bernard Herrmann's score from Alfred Hitchcock's Vertigo. It was released alongside the film on October 16, 2026.

== Release ==
On September 6, 2026, the film premiered at the 53rd Telluride Film Festival as a secret screening. Attendees were unaware of what film they would be seeing and were required to surrender their mobile phones to prevent leaking information; that same day, A24 released the film's teaser trailer. The film's Telluride premiere drew positive early reviews. The film was quickly added to the line-up of the 2026 New York Film Festival on September 30, following its premiere at Telluride. On October 13, it was announced as the closing film (of 130) at the 2026 Stockholm International Film Festival for two screenings, on November 21 and 22.

You Can See Everything was released on October 16 in both the US and Canada. It was scheduled for release in Poland on November 6, in Australia and New Zealand on November 12, with the United Kingdom and Ireland receiving the film on November 20. In October 2026, Sony Pictures Worldwide Acquisitions acquired distribution rights to the documentary in Latin America, Scandinavia, South Africa, Germany, Austria, Greece, the Middle East, Israel, India, South Korea, and Southeast Asia. On November 4, 2026 A24 shared that NASA had requested for the film to be screened aboard the International Space Station.

== Reception ==
=== Box office ===
As of November 22, 2026, You Can See Everything grossed $94 million in the United States and Canada, and $5 million in other territories, for a worldwide total of $99 million.

In the United States and Canada, You Can See Everything was released alongside Whalefall, Street Fighter, and Sense and Sensibility, and was initially projected to gross $7–8 million from 855 theaters in its opening weekend. After making $5.5 million on its first day (including $1.8 million from Thursday night previews), weekend estimates were increased to $12–14 million. It went on to debut to $15.6 million, finishing second at the box office behind Street Fighter. It was the second-best opening weekend ever for a non-musical documentary behind Fahrenheit 9/11 ($23.9 million in 2004) and the biggest opening for a film playing in under 1,000 theaters since Borat ($26.4 million in 2006); there were reportedly more than 2,000 sold-out showings over the weekend. In its second weekend, the film expanded to 2,655 theaters and remained in second place, this time behind newcomer Clayface, earning $18.7 million (an increase of 20%). In its third weekend, the film expanded to 3,478 theaters and grossed $11.4 million (a drop of 39%), topping the box office and becoming the first non-musical documentary to reach #1 since Fahrenheit 9/11.

=== Critical response ===
On the review aggregator website Rotten Tomatoes, the film holds an approval rating of 97% based on 247 reviews, with an average rating of 9.2/10. The website's consensus reads: "Nathan Fielder's ironclad commitment to the bit is pushed to its limit in You Can See Everything, an inscrutable Rorschach test of Elizabeth Holmes's psyche that's as absorbing as it is haunting." Metacritic, which uses a weighted average, assigned the film a score of 97 out of 100, based on 52 critics, indicating "universal acclaim". PostTrak audiences gave the film a 98% positive score, with 91% rating it a "definite recommend".

Manohla Dargis of The New York Times praised the film, writing, "Few movies speak as uncannily to the pathos and destabilizing confusions of the present moment". Dargis further posited it to be the inverse of Orson Welles's 1938 radio broadcast of The War of the Worlds, suggesting that in a way similar to how Welles exposed the "extent of [the] American lunatic fringe", You Can See Everything exposes "the legitimacy conferred on Holmes by her fame and the hundreds of millions of dollars that went into Theranos ... [s]erious people took her seriously".

Writing for Variety, Owen Gleiberman called the film "a one-of-a-kind reality-TV-as-hangout-movie psychodrama circus" and said that it "overlaps reality, performance, deception, and mental illness until it brings you into the enigmatic space where all those things meet". Richard Brody of The New Yorker noted how Fielder's role in You Can See Everything differed heavily from his past performances in programs such as Nathan for You, writing that "[n]othing Fielder discovers can top what's already widely known, so his observations inevitably temper Holmes's public image. Fielder's portrait of Holmes and his display of his methods turn his questioning to self-questioning, forcing him to assess, and even revise, basic assumptions about her and about life in general ... [f]or all the unpleasantness ... the film is more than fascinating and ingenious; it's strangely, poetically, poignantly beautiful".

Adrian Horton of The Guardian wrote that the film "was somehow, more shocking, twistier, thornier and revealing than billed", describing it as a "stupefying and gloriously destabilizing hall of psychological mirrors, a thrilling once-in-a-lifetime collision of director and subject." The Daily Beast's Nick Schager called You Can See Everything "not just the film of the year—it's a documentary that stands shoulder-to-shoulder with the form's all-time greats." Alison Willmore of Vulture concurred in a review titled "Nathan Fielder Has Made the Movie of the Year", calling it "a surreal, agonizingly intimate window ... [into] how we decide whether we really know what's going on in the head and the heart of another person, where manipulation ends and investment begins".

Stephanie Zacharek, writing for Time, praised the second half, calling it "uncomfortably alluring." Zacharek, however, criticized the film for having a "stultifying smirkiness", and found its central theme of objectivity self-evident, writing that "You Can See Everything is designed to make us think, hard, about the relationship between a documentarian and his subject. But anyone who's never considered that relationship before probably hasn't been watching documentaries closely enough".

=== Response from involved parties ===
In an interview with David Friedberg on the All-In podcast shortly after the film's theatrical release, Billy Evans said he hoped the film would allow viewers to "see who [Elizabeth Holmes] is" independently of media coverage. He also said that he had not seen the film, and acknowledged that participating in it may have been "the dumbest thing [he had] ever done". In a subsequent interview with CBS Sunday Morning, Evans said that he had enjoyed watching the film and did not regret inviting Nathan Fielder into his home, but maintained that the film's negative depiction of him was "entertainment". In an interview with The Hollywood Reporter, Evans said "Nathan and Lance made a beautiful film and they told a really compelling story. It just really differs from the reality that I experienced." Evans has not spoken to Fielder since the film's release.

Lance Oppenheim claimed Evans gave the filmmakers permission for a scene of Evans fully nude in the shower, but Evans disputed this. Evans said he had requested that the filmmakers pixelate the nudity prior to the film's release, including through his lawyers, but the filmmakers refused to do so. He also said that it had been awkward to know that his children's teachers had seen him nude.

Fielder said in an October 2026 interview with Wired that Holmes had called him shortly before the film's theatrical release, expressing trust in him.

Bad Blood author John Carreyrou, whose investigative reporting helped expose Holmes's fraud, admired how the filmmakers provided "a microscope with which to observe and dissect [Holmes's] lies". In an op-ed for Stat, Theranos whistleblower Tyler Shultz praised the documentary's artistic merit but questioned Fielder's omissions. He noted that the device Holmes showed Fielder in the film was not the "unimpressive and rudimentary" one that led to Holmes's imprisonment, but rather an incomplete prototype of a future Theranos product; that she had been living at the $125 million Green Gables Estate during her trial; and that she had refused to show audited financial statements to investors. In an interview with CBS Mornings, Shultz said of the documentary: "They barely re-litigate Theranos at all, and when they do, they do so just enough to make sure there's doubt in the audience's mind about whether she was ... telling the truth or not." He also believed that the intention of the documentary from Holmes's perspective was to gain sympathy, but noted how easy that is due to what he described as her "abusive relationship" with Evans, and commended Fielder for confronting the matter.

New York Times reporter Amy Chozick, whose alleged misquote of Holmes is a major topic in the film (Chozick is not named in the film), stood by the accuracy of the quote, explaining she wrote it down in her notebook immediately after Holmes spoke it in reference to Jennifer Lawrence dropping out of portraying her in a film, and the quote was confirmed with her editors in 2023 after Evans's inquiry. Chozick denied the couple's claim that they had recorded all their conversations with her, while admitting she no longer had the notebook and so could not provide it as evidence. She noted that in the film, neither Holmes nor Evans dispute or even reference additional quotes and context in the article, in which Holmes elaborated on the idea that her public persona was inauthentic.

=== Cultural impact ===
The documentary quickly became a cultural phenomenon. Fielder and Holmes were frequently listed as popular Halloween costumes for 2026, and look-alike contests were held in New York City and Los Angeles. A scene where Fielder interrogates Holmes to determine whether or not she is deceiving him was subject to parody on several comedy shows. This Hour Has 22 Minutes, a show which Fielder once worked on, used the dynamic to parody an interaction between Canadian Prime Minister Mark Carney and Donald Trump. The hosts of talk shows Late Night with Seth Meyers and The Tonight Show Starring Jimmy Fallon parodied the scene with Kate McKinnon and Jamie Lee Curtis respectively. On the November 6, 2026 episode of Saturday Night Live, host Druski donned whiteface to portray Holmes in a sketch titled Dru Can See Everything, which generated extensive media coverage. In response to the sketch, Evans stated in a now-deleted post on X that he would've "gone Robert Downey Jr. style in Tropic Thunder as Druski had it been approved".

=== Accolades ===
Award	Date	Category	Recipient(s)	Result	Ref.
SCAD Savannah Film Festival	November 2, 2026	Audience Award	You Can See Everything	Won	
Critics' Choice Documentary Awards	November 8, 2026	Best Documentary Feature	You Can See Everything	Won	
Critics' Choice Documentary Awards	November 8, 2026	Best Director	Nathan Fielder and Lance Oppenheim	Won	
Critics' Choice Documentary Awards	November 8, 2026	Best Cinematography	David Bolen	Won	
Critics' Choice Documentary Awards	November 8, 2026	Best Editing	Adam Locke-Norton	Won	
Critics' Choice Documentary Awards	November 8, 2026	Best Music Score	Ari Balouzian	Won	
Hollywood Music in Media Awards	November 18, 2026	Best Original Score – Documentary	Ari Balouzian	Nominated	
Gotham Independent Film Awards	November 30, 2026	Best Documentary	Nathan Fielder, Lance Oppenheim, Maggie Ambrose, Tatiana Bears, Jack Davis	Pending	
Gotham Independent Film Awards	November 30, 2026	Audience Award	Nathan Fielder, Lance Oppenheim, Maggie Ambrose, Tatiana Bears, Jack Davis	Pending	
IDA Documentary Awards	December 4, 2026	Best Feature Documentary	You Can See Everything	Pending	
IDA Documentary Awards	December 4, 2026	Best Director	Nathan Fielder and Lance Oppenheim	Pending	
IDA Documentary Awards	December 4, 2026	Best Original Music Score	Ari Balouzian	Pending	
Cinema Eye Honors	January 11, 2027	Outstanding Achievement in Nonfiction Feature Filmmaking	Various (Note: Nathan Fielder, Lance Oppenheim, Tatiana Bears, Maggie Ambrose, Jack Davis, David Bolen, Adam Locke-Norton, Ari Balouzian, Richard Carlos, Paul Hsu, Elizabeth Holmes, Billy Evans, and Amanda Seyfried.)	Pending	
Cinema Eye Honors	January 11, 2027	Audience Choice Prize	You Can See Everything	Pending	
Cinema Eye Honors	January 11, 2027	Outstanding Achievement in Direction	Nathan Fielder and Lance Oppenheim	Pending	
Cinema Eye Honors	January 11, 2027	Outstanding Achievement in Production	Nathan Fielder, Lance Oppenheim, Tatiana Bears, Maggie Ambrose, and Jack Davis	Pending	
Cinema Eye Honors	January 11, 2027	Outstanding Achievement in Editing	Adam Locke-Norton	Pending	
Cinema Eye Honors	January 11, 2027	Outstanding Achievement in Cinematography	David Bolen	Pending	
Cinema Eye Honors	January 11, 2027	Outstanding Achievement in Original Music Score	Ari Balouzian	Pending	

== See also ==
- Metacinema
- The Rehearsal (TV series)
- The Journalist and the Murderer

=== Similar films ===
- Close-Up
- F for Fake
- Real Life
- Stories We Tell
- Symbiopsychotaxiplasm, an experimental documentary in which the film's director appears as a fictionalised version of himself.
- Synecdoche, New York
