= Billy Evans (businessman) =

American entrepreneur

- Born: William Billings Evans; January 11, 1992 (age 34)
- Education: Massachusetts Institute of Technology (BS)
- Occupation: Entrepreneur
- Title: Chief executive officer of Haemanthus
- Partner: Elizabeth Holmes
- Children: 2

William Billings Evans (born January 11, 1992), known as Billy Evans, is the partner of Elizabeth Holmes, the founder of Theranos, whom he met in 2017 after she was under federal investigation for fraud. He is the heir of Evans Hotels, and the founder of Haemanthus, a diagnostics start-up based in Austin, Texas.

Evans is discussed in the book Bad Blood: Secrets and Lies in a Silicon Valley Startup, the podcast The Dropout, and the television miniseries of that name. He is a central figure in the 2026 documentary You Can See Everything, directed by Nathan Fielder and Lance Oppenheim, which showed his relationship with Holmes in the lead-up to, and during her prison sentence, including their work together on "Theranos 2.0".

== Early life and education ==
Evans, who grew up in San Diego, California, is the eldest of three children born to Susan and William L. Evans. His grandparents, Anne and William D. Evans, opened a hotel on Mission Bay in 1953, which later became Evans Hotels, a family-owned company that operates three properties in San Diego. One of the hotels is in La Jolla, and two are located in Mission Bay. In an October 2026 statement, the company said that Evans was neither an employee nor a shareholder. Evans Hotel Group is managed by Billy Evans' father. Evans is heir to the hotel chain owned by his family. His net worth was valued at US$10 million in 2022–2026. Several members of Evans's family, including his mother, uncle, and maternal grandmother, are devout members of the Church of Jesus Christ of Latter-day Saints.

Evans attended the Francis Parker School in San Diego. He then attended the Massachusetts Institute of Technology from 2010 to 2015. Evans played on the men's volleyball team, the MIT Engineers, and graduated in 2015 with a bachelor's degree in economics. Evans studied abroad at Fudan University in Shanghai in 2013 and 2014.

== Career ==
=== Medical startup and Luminar Technologies ===
After college, Evans reportedly tried to launch a medical concierge start-up, which did not succeed. Forbes reported that earlier versions of Evans's LinkedIn profile listed him as a strategy and leadership program analyst at LinkedIn until February 2017. He then worked as a special projects manager at the LiDAR company Luminar Technologies from 2017 to January 2019. His LinkedIn profile was later edited to remove every position except Haemanthus.

=== Haemanthus ===
Evans has listed himself as the chief executive of Haemanthus since 2022. The company was incorporated in Delaware by late 2023 and is based in Austin. It shares its name with the flower haemanthus, which is Greek for "blood flower". Haemanthus has not released products. Evans called his company "the future of diagnostics". Haemanthus said it was planning on building a machine for medical testing using only small amounts of blood.

The company was co-founded by Holmes' college friend, Lauren Friedman Stat. Stat had previously written a letter to the judge in the case, United States v. Elizabeth A. Holmes, et al., to defend the character of her fellow university classmate. Stat's husband, medical doctor David Stat, also provided assistance in the foundation of the company. She described the company's purpose as "a way to give Holmes something to look forward to during her prison sentence".

Haemanthus is developing a countertop device that Evans stated can use lasers to analyze blood, urine, and saliva at the molecular level. Rather than shrinking conventional laboratory methods in the way that Theranos had attempted, the device uses Raman spectroscopy. According to company materials, it would identify biomarkers such as glucose and hormones within seconds and use deep learning models to detect cancer and infections. A patent for the company's Raman spectroscopy system was granted on January 21, 2025. The company plans to begin by testing pets before moving to humans. Its long-term goal is a stamp-sized wearable device, which it told investors would take three years and $70 million to develop. The New York Times noted that a photo of the prototype shown to investors resembled the Theranos testing machine.

The company's investor materials stated that its product faced no regulatory oversight and that the United States Department of Agriculture had confirmed this in writing. A USDA spokesperson told the Times that the agency does regulate veterinary diagnostics. Evans provided a partially redacted USDA document stating that the product did not appear to fall within the jurisdiction of the agency's Center for Veterinary Biologics.

Haemanthus first sought $3.5 million from friends and family. In the spring of 2025, it began seeking an additional $15 million from investors in Austin and the San Francisco Bay Area, and its materials described a goal of eventually raising more than $50 million. The venture capitalist Jim Breyer said that his firm declined to invest for many of the same reasons it had passed on Theranos. As of 2025, about a dozen people worked for the company, and much of its leadership had previously worked with Evans at Luminar. By 2026, the company reported funding of up to $20 million.

Elizabeth Holmes is not named in the Haemanthus incorporation documents, and the company's investor presentation did not mention Evans' relationship with her. In 2025, NPR reported that Holmes had been advising Evans on the company from prison, though a source familiar with the company said that she did not plan to take a formal role. Another source familiar with the business told The Wall Street Journal that she is not involved. In a 2025 thread on X, the company acknowledged Evans' relationship with Holmes and said that it was "not Theranos 2.0". In You Can See Everything, however, Evans accepts that description, and he and Holmes are shown making fundraising calls and discussing product development. A chemistry professor at the University of California, Irvine who consults for the company told Wired that Haemanthus' engineering ideas were credible and that it was not a repeat of Theranos.

== Personal life ==
Evans met Holmes in 2017 at a Fleet Week event in San Francisco, while she was under federal investigation. He described it as love at first sight, and that he didn't know who she was until they'd been talking for hours as she was wearing a hat, sunglasses, and a band-aid on her face. Evans said in a 2025 People Magazine interview that he was initially hesitant to pursue a committed relationship with Holmes due to her ongoing litigation proceedings, but his feelings deepened over time. They attended the festival Burning Man in the desert in Nevada together. Evans and Holmes subsequently moved in together into an apartment in San Francisco, California. They jointly took care of a Siberian Husky dog named Balto. The couple became engaged in August 2018, at a Taylor Swift concert during the singer's Reputation Stadium Tour. Evans proposed marriage to Holmes using his Massachusetts Institute of Technology signet ring. In 2019, they spent six months traveling the United States in an RV. The same year, Business Insider reported they had a private wedding ceremony. People reported they were married as of 2022, but as of 2025, Evans implied they were not married. During Holmes' federal trial, United States v. Elizabeth A. Holmes, et al., Evans' father Bill attended the court proceedings in a disguise and informed people his name was "Hanson" and that he was a car mechanic. Evans wrote two memos on behalf of Holmes at the sentencing portion of her federal trial in 2022. Evans asked the court to give a lenient sentence for his partner. In February 2025, Holmes told People from prison that the couple never officially married, but they might marry someday. Evans and Holmes purchased rings for each other on Amazon before she reported to prison.

In October 2026, the Los Angeles Times reported that Evans "routinely" referred to Holmes as his wife. On October 14, 2026, Evans was interviewed live on the All-In Podcast with David Friedberg. Friedberg asked him, "You're Elizabeth Holmes' husband?", to which Evans responded, "Yes, Elizabeth Holmes is my wife, and best friend, and partner." Elizabeth Holmes has stated they're not legally married. Asked about his recent life, Evans said "It's hard because I'm building a business and I'm trying to free my wife from prison and I'm raising two kids." Evans referred to Holmes' parents as his in-laws. He acknowledged he skimmed the book by John Carreyrou, Bad Blood: Secrets and Lies in a Silicon Valley Startup, because he was advised to do so by his lawyers. He said he had watched one-and-a-half episodes of the TV series The Dropout.

Evans and Holmes have two children, William (born 2021) and Invicta (born 2023). During the period of time after having her children and before starting her prison sentence, Holmes devoted her time as a stay-at-home mother for her children with Evans. They lived together during this period of time, in a rented house on a 74-acre estate called Green Gables, in Woodside, California. Their residence was a 15 minute drive from Holmes' former place of work at the headquarters of Theranos in Palo Alto. Holmes has been serving her sentence at Federal Prison Camp, Bryan since May 2023, and Evans lives in Austin with their children. Holmes gave him power of attorney when she began her sentence. She is scheduled to move to a halfway house near Austin in August 2027.

== In media ==
=== Theranos coverage ===
Author John Carreyrou included an afterword to Bad Blood: Secrets and Lies in a Silicon Valley Startup, with discussion of the early relationship between Evans and Holmes and their decision to start a family during her federal trial United States v. Elizabeth A. Holmes, et al.

Evans featured in coverage of the trial of Elizabeth Holmes, in the podcast The Dropout by journalist Rebecca Jarvis.

In the American biographical drama television miniseries The Dropout, created by Elizabeth Meriwether, Evans was portrayed by actor Garrett Coffey.

=== You Can See Everything ===
Evans was a central figure in the 2026 documentary You Can See Everything, directed by Nathan Fielder and Lance Oppenheim.

The film began after Holmes contacted A24, and the studio later brought in Nathan Fielder and Lance Oppenheim. Evans and Holmes gave the filmmakers access to their lives during the film's three-year production. Fielder lived in the couple's home for about a month before Holmes began her prison sentence in May 2023. The first half of the film took place during the final 34 days prior to Holmes reporting to prison in Bryan, Texas for her 11-year jail sentence. The Austin, Texas home featured in the film was valued at $2.5 million. The film was released in theaters in October 2026.

The film shows Holmes undergoing a full-body scan used to create an AI-generated avatar of her, which Evans controls. He says that his power of attorney allows him to make decisions about her voice and likeness. The film also shows Evans managing Holmes's X account. He says that he often posts without her knowledge or approval, though he says that she writes about 80 percent of the posts. Towards the end of the filming process, Evans attempted to exercise control over the production itself.

In conversation with Amanda Seyfried in the film, he threatened to harm the writers and producers of The Dropout. He thinks the writers and producers are "deplorable" people. He said in the film he would ruin their lives, that he was strategic, well-resourced and that he knows "people who can do just about anything".

Late in the film, during a meeting with A24 executives and Fielder, it is revealed that Evans demanded a share of the backend profits in exchange for unrestricted access to Elizabeth. Because this meeting occurred after filming began but before contracts were signed, the scene is reenacted with actor Christopher Abbott playing Evans. The film later reports that he dropped the demand. On the All-In podcast, Evans said that the film's purpose was "to have people see who she is".
