= Haemanthus (company) =

American blood testing startup

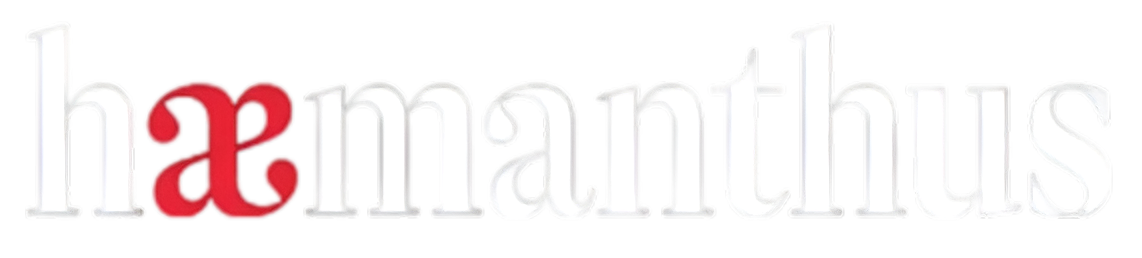
- Type: Private
- Industry: Health care
- Founded: 2022; 4 years ago
- Founder: Billy Evans
- Products: Blood tests
- Website: www.haemanthus.com

Haemanthus (sometimes stylized as Hæmanthus) is an American blood testing startup founded by Billy Evans, partner of Elizabeth Holmes. Haemanthus claims to use Raman spectroscopy in its analyses. The company is currently testing on pets, and plans to later move to humans. In the documentary You Can See Everything, Evans describes Haemanthus as "Theranos 2.0" and says that the plan is to get the band back together to do it all again. The company has stated Elizabeth Holmes has "zero involvement" and does not have a current or future role. However, the The New York Times and NPR reported otherwise.

== Background ==
Elizabeth Holmes founded Theranos in 2003, which purported to have developed similar blood tests. However, the claims by Theranos were false. In 2022, Holmes and her ex-partner, Ramesh "Sunny" Balwani, were convicted of fraud, leading to the company's disestablishment and Holmes being sentenced to 11 years in prison.

The company has told investors the company faces "no regulatory oversight" which it claimed the United States Department of Agriculture had confirmed. A United States Department of Agriculture spokesperson was not able to confirm whether the agency had corresponded with Haemanthus, but stated that the "U.S.D.A. does regulate vet diagnostics".

== History ==
Haemanthus was founded in 2022. Haemanthus was incorporated in February 2024 by American Billy Evans, the romantic partner of Elizabeth Holmes, founder of fraudulent health technology company Theranos. Theranos claimed to have devised blood tests that required very small amounts of blood, could be performed rapidly and accurately, and only required compact, automated "Edison" devices; these claims were proven false, and the company was dissolved in 2018 following several years of legal and commercial challenges. (Note: It was reported that Theranos became defunct on September 4 due to an email sent by then CEO David Taylor to Theranos shareholders, though other reports state that Theranos remained active until its patents and most of its remaining assets were transferred to Fortress Investment Group the following week on September 12.)

Evans and Holmes met in 2017 during the company's fraud investigation. Haemanthus is named after the genus of flowering plants haemanthus, which has species known as the "blood lily".

The company was co-founded by Holmes' college friend, Lauren Friedman Stat. Friedman Stat had previously written a letter to the judge in the case, United States v. Elizabeth A. Holmes, et al., to defend Holmes' character. Friedman Stat's husband, medical doctor David Stat, also provided assistance in the foundation of the company. Friedman Stat described the company's purpose as, "a way to give Holmes something to look forward to during her prison sentence".

The company says that it is developing a device which will test blood, urine and saliva samples for disease, similar to the Theranos false claims about the "Edison" device. Haemanthus intends to first begin animal testing on pets before progressing to humans, for which the company says it will make a wearable device to do the testing. The company claims to use Raman spectroscopy, a technique that can be used to characterize the chemical composition of a sample using its response to laser light. The company has one patent, filed in January 2025.

In May 2025, the company had 10-12 employees.

Holmes reportedly advises Evans on the company from federal prison, but her role is not clear. According to Fortune, the company has said that Holmes does not have a "formal" role in the company. Haemanthus has said that it is not a "Theranos 2.0". In the 2026 documentary You Can See Everything, Evans referred to the company as Theranos 2.0. Holmes has been banned from being either an officer or director of a public company, but this restriction does not include private companies such as Haemanthus. The company reported in May 2025 that it received $3.5 million in funding from friends and family and was seeking an additional $15 million from other investors.
