= Elizabeth Holmes =

American businesswoman (born 1984)

- Holmes in 2014
- Born: Elizabeth Anne Holmes; February 3, 1984 (age 42); Washington, D.C., U.S.
- Education: Stanford University (dropped out)
- Years active: 2003–2018
- Known for: Founder and CEO of Theranos; Criminal fraud
- Partner: Billy Evans (2017–present)
- Children: 2
- Status: Incarcerated at Federal Prison Camp, Bryan (reported May 30, 2023); Register Number: 24965-111
- Convictions: Wire fraud (3 counts); Conspiracy to commit wire fraud (1 count)
- Penalty: 11 1/4 years in prison
- Accomplice: Sunny Balwani

Elizabeth Anne Holmes (born February 3, 1984) is an American businesswoman convicted of fraud in connection with her health technology company Theranos. Holmes founded Theranos in 2003, and its valuation soared in the early 2010s after it claimed to have revolutionized blood testing by developing methods that needed only very small volumes of blood, such as from a fingerprick. In 2015, Forbes named Holmes the youngest and wealthiest self-made female billionaire in the United States on the basis of a $9 billion valuation of Theranos. In the following year, as accusations of fraud about Theranos's claims began to surface, Forbes revised its estimate of Holmes's net worth to zero, and Fortune named her in its feature article on "The World's 19 Most Disappointing Leaders".

The decline of Theranos began in 2015, when a series of journalistic and regulatory investigations revealed doubts about the company's claims and whether Holmes had been truthful with investors and the government. In 2018, the U.S. Securities and Exchange Commission (SEC) charged Theranos, Holmes, and former Theranos chief operating officer (COO) Ramesh "Sunny" Balwani with raising $700 million from investors through a fraud involving false or exaggerated claims about the accuracy of the company's blood-testing technology; Holmes settled the charges by paying a $500,000 no admit no deny (NAND) fine, returning 18.9 million shares to the company, relinquishing her voting control of Theranos, and accepting a ten-year ban from serving as an officer or director of a public company.

Holmes was in a clandestine romantic relationship with Balwani throughout most of Theranos's history. Holmes and Balwani jointly ran the company with a "dysfunctional corporate culture" of "secrecy and fear" according to employees. Staff also claimed that those who "raised concerns or objections" were "usually marginalized or fired" by the pair. Following the collapse of Theranos, Holmes started dating hotel heir William "Billy" Evans, with whom she has had two children (born in 2021 and 2023). Their relationship is documented in the 2026 film You Can See Everything, which was produced with Holmes's participation.

A federal grand jury indicted Holmes and Balwani on fraud charges in June 2018. Her trial in the case of U.S. v. Holmes, et al. ended in January 2022 when Holmes was convicted of defrauding investors and acquitted of defrauding patients. She was sentenced to serve 11 1/4 years at Federal Prison Camp, Bryan, beginning on May 30, 2023. She and Balwani were ordered to pay $452 million in restitution to the victims of the fraud. The credibility of Theranos was attributed in part to Holmes's personal connections and ability to recruit the support of influential people, including Henry Kissinger, George Shultz, Jim Mattis, and Betsy DeVos, all of whom had served or went on to serve as U.S. presidential cabinet officials.

== Early life ==
Elizabeth Anne Holmes was born on February 3, 1984, in Washington, D.C. Her father, Christian Rasmus Holmes IV, was a vice president at a subsidiary of Enron called Clean Energy Solutions Group. Her mother, Noel Anne (née Daoust), worked as a Congressional committee staffer. Christian later held executive positions in government agencies such as USAID, the EPA, and USTDA. Holmes is partly of Danish ancestry. One of her paternal great-great-great-grandfathers was Charles Louis Fleischmann, a Jewish-Hungarian immigrant to the United States who founded Fleischmann's Yeast. The Holmes family "was very proud of its yeast empire" history, according to family friend Joseph Fuisz: "I think the parents very much yearned for the days of yore when the family was one of the richest in America. And I think Elizabeth channeled that, and at a young age." Her great-grandfather Christian R. Holmes Jr. was awarded the Distinguished Service Cross in World War I and had wild-animal collections in California and Hawaii.

Holmes graduated from high school at St. John's School in Houston. During high school, she was interested in computer programming and says she started her first business selling C++ compilers to Chinese universities. Her parents had arranged Mandarin Chinese home tutoring, and partway through high school, Holmes began attending Stanford University's summer Mandarin program.

In 2002, Holmes attended Stanford, where she studied chemical engineering and worked as a student researcher and laboratory assistant in the Stanford School of Engineering. She was a member of Kappa Alpha Theta at Stanford. After the end of her freshman year, Holmes worked in a laboratory at the Genome Institute of Singapore and tested for severe acute respiratory syndrome coronavirus (SARS-CoV-1) through the collection of blood samples with syringes. She filed her first patent application on a wearable drug-delivery patch in 2003.

Holmes reported that she was raped at Stanford in 2003. According to a police report filed on the evening of October 5, 2003, Holmes called police and reported that she had been sexually assaulted at a fraternity house at Stanford between 1 a.m. and 3 a.m. that morning. In March 2004, she dropped out of Stanford's School of Engineering and used her tuition money as seed funding for a consumer healthcare technology company.

== Theranos ==
=== Founding ===
Theranos logo

In 2003, Holmes founded the company Real-Time Cures in Palo Alto, California, to "democratize healthcare". Holmes described her fear of needles as a motivation and sought to perform blood tests using only small amounts of blood. Holmes pitched the idea to reap "vast amounts of data from a few droplets of blood derived from the tip of a finger" to medicine professor Phyllis Gardner at Stanford, who responded, "I don't think your idea is going to work", explaining that it was impossible to do what Holmes was claiming could be done due to the limited blood samples. Several other expert medical professors told Holmes the same thing. However, Holmes did not relent, and she succeeded in getting her advisor and dean at the School of Engineering, Channing Robertson, to back her idea. In 2003, Holmes renamed the company Theranos (a combination of the words "therapy" and "diagnosis"). The company's original name, "Real-Time Cures", was changed after deciding that too many people were skeptical of the word "cure". Robertson became the company's first board member and introduced Holmes to venture capitalists.

=== Funding and expansion ===
By December 2004, Holmes had raised $6 million to fund the firm. By the end of 2010, Theranos had more than $92 million in venture capital. In July 2011, Holmes was introduced to former secretary of state George Shultz. After a two-hour meeting, he joined the Theranos board of directors. Holmes was recognized for forming "the most illustrious board in U.S. corporate history" over the next three years.

Under Holmes, Theranos was known for its secrecy. In September 2013, the company announced a partnership with Walgreens to launch in-store blood sample collection centers. She was interviewed for Medscape by its editor-in-chief, Eric Topol, who praised her for "this phenomenal rebooting of laboratory medicine". Media attention increased in 2014, when Holmes appeared on the covers of Fortune, Forbes, T: The New York Times Style Magazine, and Inc.

Forbes recognized Holmes as the world's youngest self-made female billionaire and ranked her #110 on the Forbes 400 in 2014. Theranos was valued at $9 billion and had raised more than $400 million in venture capital. By the end of 2014, her name appeared on 18 U.S. patents and 66 foreign patents. During 2015, Holmes established agreements with Cleveland Clinic, Capital Blue Cross, and AmeriHealth Caritas to use Theranos technology.

=== Downfall ===
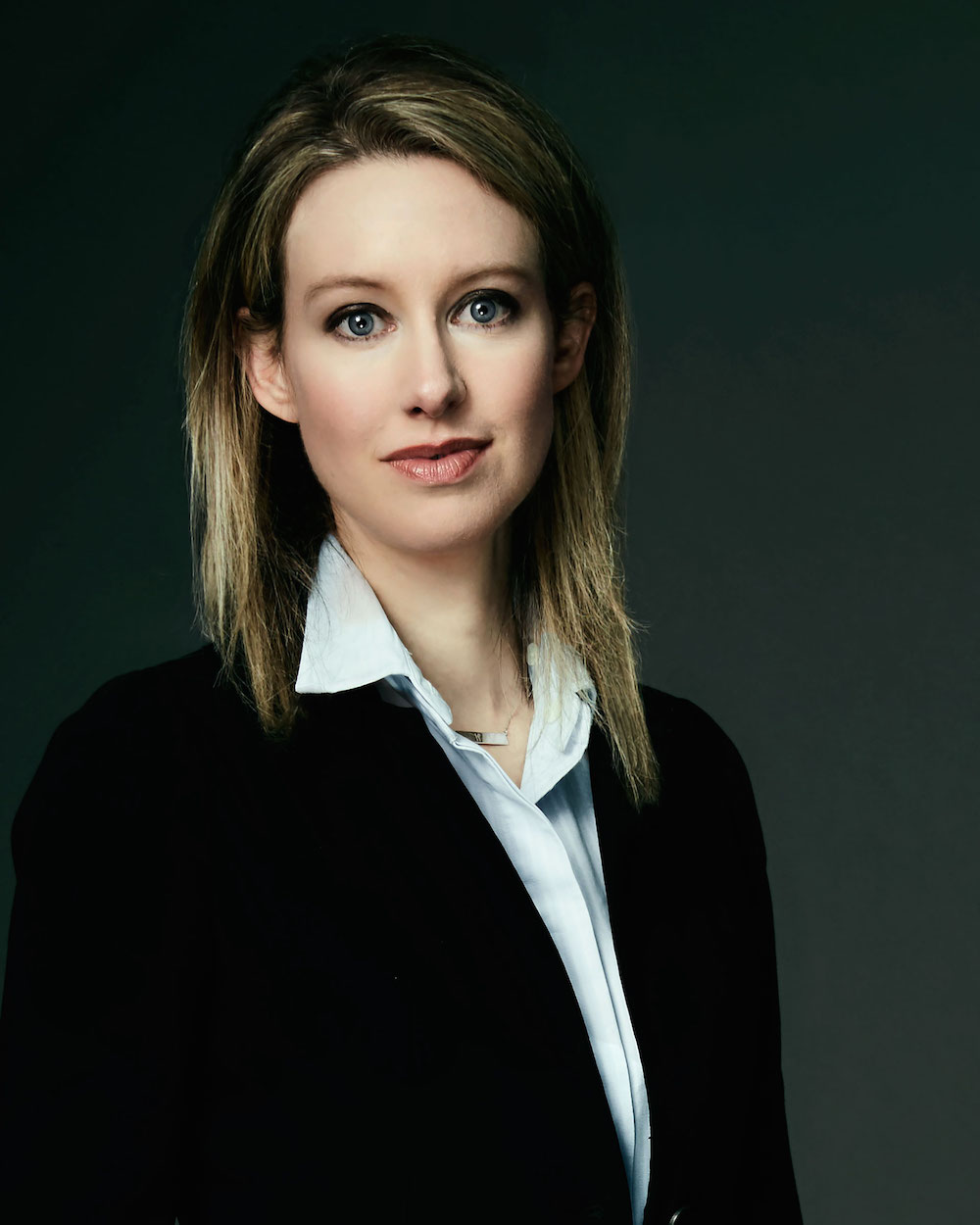
A picture of Holmes from a 2016 Theranos press kit.

John Carreyrou of The Wall Street Journal initiated a secret, months-long investigation of Theranos after he received a tip from a medical expert who thought that Theranos's Edison blood testing device seemed suspicious. Carreyrou spoke to ex-employee whistleblowers and obtained company documents. When Holmes' lawyer David Boies learned of the investigation, Holmes initiated a campaign to stop Carreyrou from publishing, which included legal and financial threats against both the Journal and the whistleblowers tied to the expected release of trade secrets.

In October 2015, despite Boies's legal threats and strong-arm tactics, the Journal published Carreyrou's "bombshell article" detailing how the Edison device gave inaccurate results, and revealing that the company had been using commercially available machines manufactured by other companies for most of its testing. Carreyrou continued to report problems with the company and Holmes's conduct in a series of articles and, in 2018, published a book titled Bad Blood: Secrets and Lies in a Silicon Valley Startup, detailing his investigation of Theranos.

Holmes denied all the claims, calling the Journal a "tabloid" and promising that her company would publish data on the accuracy of its tests. She appeared on CNBC's Mad Money the same evening the Journal exposé was published. Jim Cramer said, "The article was pretty brutal", to which Holmes responded, "This is what happens when you work to change things, first they think you're crazy, then they fight you, and then all of a sudden you change the world."

In January 2016, the Centers for Medicare and Medicaid Services (CMS) sent a warning letter to Theranos after an inspection of its Newark, California, laboratory uncovered irregularities with staff proficiency, procedures, and equipment. CMS regulators proposed a two-year ban on Holmes from owning or operating a certified clinical laboratory after the company had not fixed problems in its California lab in March 2016. On The Today Show, Holmes said she was "devastated we did not catch and fix these issues faster" and said the lab would be rebuilt with help from a new scientific and medical advisory board.

In July 2016, CMS banned Holmes from owning, operating, or directing a blood-testing service for a period of two years. Theranos appealed that decision to a U.S. Department of Health and Human Services appeals board. Shortly thereafter, Walgreens ended its relationship with Theranos and closed its in-store blood collection centers. The U.S. Food and Drug Administration (FDA) also ordered the company to cease use of its Capillary Tube Nanotainer device, one of its core inventions.

In 2017, the State of Arizona filed suit against Theranos, alleging that the company had sold 1.5 million blood tests to Arizonans while concealing or misrepresenting important facts about those tests. In April 2017, the company settled the lawsuit by agreeing to refund the cost of the tests to consumers, and to pay $225,000 in civil fines and attorney fees, for a total of $4.65 million. Other reported ongoing actions include an unspecified investigation by the U.S. Federal Bureau of Investigation (FBI) and two class action fraud lawsuits. Holmes denied any wrongdoing.

On May 16, 2017, approximately 99 percent of Theranos shareholders reached an agreement with the company to dismiss all litigation and potential litigation in exchange for shares of preferred stock. Holmes released a portion of her equity to offset any dilution of stock value to non-participating shareholders.

In March 2018, the U.S. Securities and Exchange Commission (SEC) charged Holmes and Theranos's former president, Ramesh Balwani, with fraud by taking more than $700 million from investors while advertising a false product. The charges of fraud included the company's false claim that its technology was being used by the U.S. Department of Defense in combat situations. The company also lied when it claimed to have a $100-million revenue stream in 2014. That year, the company made only $100,000. On March 14, 2018, Holmes settled the lawsuit. The terms of Holmes's settlement included surrendering voting control of Theranos, returning 18.9 million shares to the company, a ban on holding an officer or director position in a public company for 10 years, and a $500,000 fine.

At its height in 2015, Theranos had more than 800 employees. It dismissed 340 people in October 2016 and an additional 155 in January 2017. In April 2018, Theranos filed a WARN Act notice with the State of California, announcing its plans to permanently lay off 105 employees, leaving it with fewer than two dozen employees. Most of the remaining employees were laid off in August 2018. On September 5, 2018, the company announced that it had begun the process of formally dissolving, with its remaining cash and assets to be distributed to its creditors.

== Trial and sentence ==
=== U.S. v. Holmes, et al. ===
In June 2018, after a two-year-long investigation by the U.S. Attorney's Office for the Northern District of California, a federal grand jury indicted Holmes and Balwani on nine counts of wire fraud and two counts of conspiracy to commit wire fraud. Both pleaded not guilty. The prosecution alleged that Holmes and Balwani had engaged in two criminal schemes: one to defraud investors, and a second to defraud doctors and patients. After the indictment was issued, Holmes resigned as CEO of Theranos but remained chair of its board of directors.

Holmes was tried in the U.S. District Court for the Northern District of California, with U.S. district judge Edward Davila presiding. She hired defense lawyers from Williams & Connolly, a prominent American law firm that specializes in white-collar crime defense. The trial began on August 31, 2021, after being delayed for more than a year due to the COVID-19 pandemic and Holmes's pregnancy. At trial, Holmes testified on her own behalf for seven days, claiming among other things that she was misled by her staff about the technology, and that Balwani held sway over her during the romantic relationship they had and which was still ongoing when the alleged criminal acts happened. The case's evidence outlined Holmes's role in faked demonstrations, falsified validation reports, misleading claims about contracts, and overstated financials at Theranos.

On January 3, 2022, the jury found Holmes guilty on four of the seven counts related to defrauding investors: three counts of wire fraud, and one of conspiracy to commit wire fraud. She was found not guilty on four counts related to defrauding patients, and the jury returned a "no verdict" on the three other counts of wire fraud against investors. The judge declared a mistrial on the last three counts, and the prosecution later agreed to dismiss them. Holmes awaited sentencing while remaining free on $500,000 bail, secured with property.

=== Federal prison ===
In November 2022, Davila sentenced Holmes to 11 1/4 years in federal prison. He also ordered her and Balwani jointly to pay $452 million in restitution to the victims of their fraud. Davila recommended she be incarcerated at Federal Prison Camp, Bryan, a minimum-security federal prison in Bryan, Texas. Holmes reported to prison on May 30, 2023. In July 2023, the Federal Bureau of Prisons projected that Holmes would be released from prison on December 29, 2032, approximately two years early, in accordance with the Bureau's guidelines for good conduct time.

Holmes appealed her conviction and sentence to the U.S. Court of Appeals for the Ninth Circuit. Her lawyers argued that Davila had committed serious legal errors by, among other things, allowing the prosecution to introduce certain government reports and expert witness analysis, by restricting their cross-examination of former Theranos laboratory director Adam Rosendorff, and by excluding some of Balwani's testimony. U.S. circuit judges Jacqueline Nguyen, Ryan D. Nelson, and Mary M. Schroeder heard oral arguments regarding her appeal in June 2024. In February 2025, the Ninth Circuit judges rejected Holmes' legal arguments and affirmed her conviction and sentence.

In December 2025, the Los Angeles Times reported that Holmes had begun campaigning for a presidential pardon from President Donald Trump.

In March 2026, Judge Davila reduced Holmes's sentence by 12 months after considering revised federal sentencing guidelines that argued for a more lenient sentence given her lack of prior convictions and the failure of the prosecution to prove that any Theranos investors had suffered personal hardship as a result of the loss of their investment in the failed venture.

On September 22, 2026, the Federal Bureau of Prisons issued a notification that Holmes was approved for a transfer to Austin Transitional Center, a halfway house in Del Valle, Texas, on August 23, 2027. Given the nature of halfway houses being a temporary stay for prisoners as they reintegrate, it was unclear if her remaining sentence would be shortened from her scheduled release date of February 22, 2030, as indicated in the letter. The letter made no mention of the cause for the transfer nor the duration of her stay at Austin Transitional Center.

== Public image ==
=== Connections ===
Theranos's board and investors included many influential figures. Holmes's first major investor was Tim Draper – Silicon Valley venture capitalist and father of Holmes's childhood friend Jesse Draper – who "cut Holmes a check" for $1 million upon hearing her initial pitch for the firm that would become Theranos. Theranos's pool of major investors expanded to include Rupert Murdoch, the Walton family, the DeVos family including Betsy DeVos, the Cox family of Cox Enterprises and Carlos Slim Helú. Each of these investors lost tens to hundreds of millions of dollars when Theranos folded.

One of Holmes's first board members was George Shultz. With Shultz's early involvement aiding Holmes's recruitment efforts, the 12-member Theranos board eventually included: Henry Kissinger, a former secretary of state; William Perry, a former secretary of defense; Jim Mattis, a future secretary of defense; Gary Roughead, a retired U.S. Navy admiral; Bill Frist, a former U.S. senator (R-TN); Sam Nunn, a former U.S. senator (D-GA); and former CEOs Dick Kovacevich of Wells Fargo and Riley Bechtel of Bechtel.

=== Promotional activities ===
Holmes partnered with Carlos Slim in June 2015 to improve blood testing in Mexico. In October 2015, she announced #IronSisters to help women in science, technology, engineering, and mathematics careers. In 2015, she helped to draft and pass a law in Arizona to let people obtain and pay for lab tests without requiring insurance or healthcare provider approval, while misrepresenting the accuracy and effectiveness of the Theranos device.

=== Recognition ===
Before the collapse of Theranos, Holmes received widespread acclaim. In 2015, she was appointed a member of the Harvard Medical School Board of Fellows and was named one of Time magazine's "Time 100 most influential people". Holmes received the Under 30 Doers Award from Forbes and was ranked number 73 in its 2015 list of "the world's most powerful women". She was also named Woman of the Year by Glamour and received an Honorary Doctor of Humane Letters from Pepperdine University.

Holmes was awarded the 2015 Horatio Alger Award of the Horatio Alger Association of Distinguished Americans, making her its youngest recipient in history. She previously had been named Fortune's Businessperson of the Year and had been listed in its 40 Under 40 feature. In 2015, she was a member of Bloomberg's 50 Most Influential. In the same year actor Jared Leto presented her with a Glamour Award and then-US President Barack Obama named her as Presidential Ambassador for Global Entrepreneurship. In 2016, Fortune named Holmes in its article on "The World's 19 Most Disappointing Leaders".

=== Net worth ===
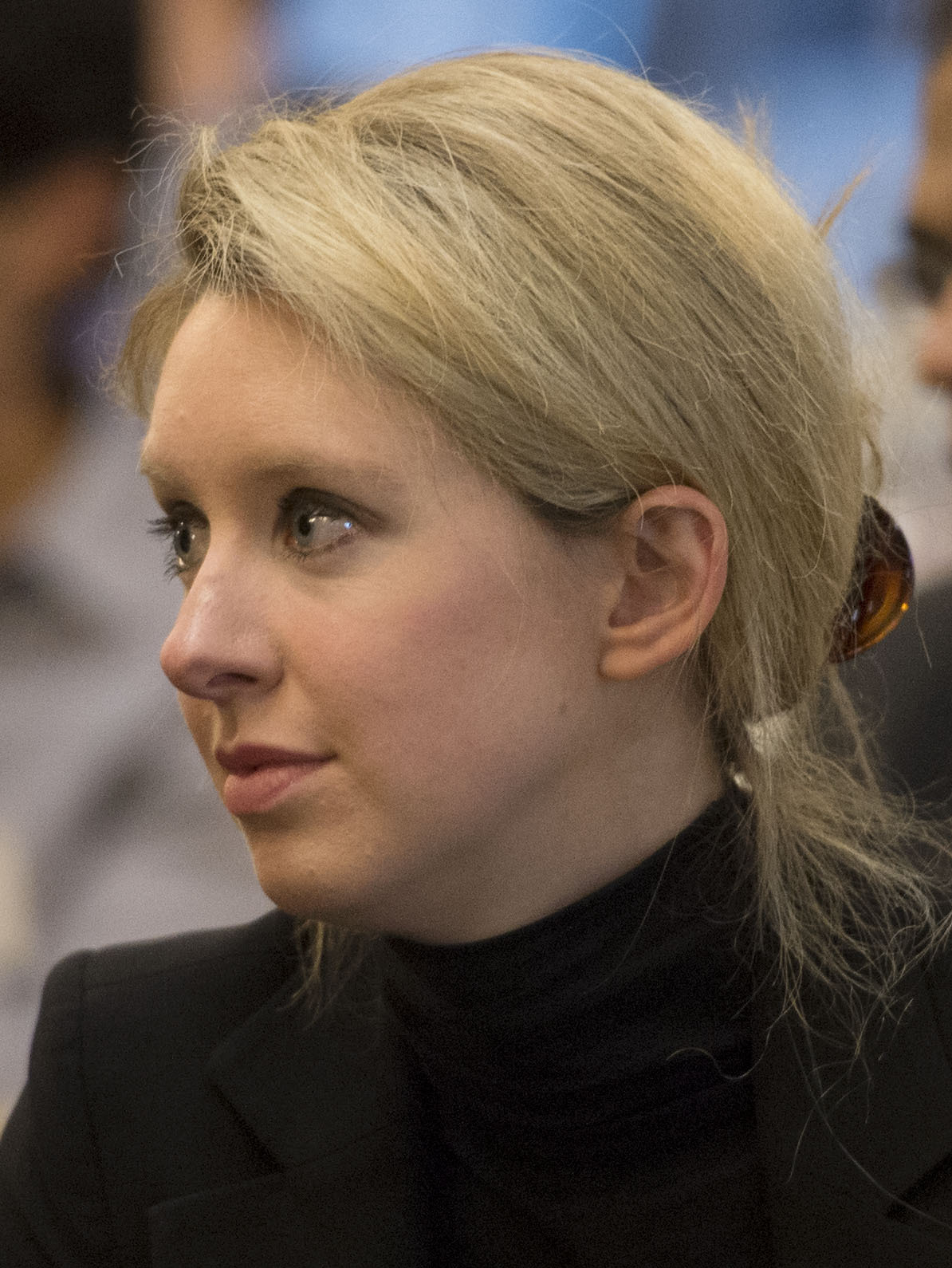
Holmes at Stanford University, 2013

The assessment of Holmes's net worth has fluctuated over time. Before the March 2018 settlement, Holmes owned half of Theranos's stock. Forbes listed her as one of U.S. Richest Self-Made Women in 2015 with a net worth of $4.5 billion. In June 2016, Forbes released an updated valuation of $800 million for Theranos, which made Holmes's stake essentially worthless, because other investors owned preferred shares and would have been paid before Holmes, who owned only common stock. Holmes reportedly owed a $25 million debt to Theranos in connection with exercising stock options. She did not receive any company cash from the arrangement, nor did she sell any of her shares, including those associated with the debt.

== Personal life ==
Holmes was an admirer of Apple founder Steve Jobs, and deliberately copied his style, frequently dressing in a black turtleneck sweater, as Jobs did. Holmes said her mother dressed her in black turtlenecks when she was young and that she had worn the turtlenecks beginning around the age of eight, but she also claims that she started wearing black turtlenecks upon founding the company in 2003. An employee said she suggested Holmes copy Jobs's famous Issey Miyake turtleneck look in 2007.

During most of her public appearances, she spoke in a deep baritone voice, although a former Theranos colleague later claimed he heard her speak in a voice stereotypical of a woman her age to welcome him when he was hired. Gardner of Stanford also denies that Holmes has a naturally deep voice. Her family, however, has maintained that her deep voice is authentic. In a 2023 New York Times interview, Holmes spoke in her natural, higher pitch voice, and confirmed that the low voice was unnatural.

Jen Shah, most known from the Real Housewives of Salt Lake City, and Holmes became close friends through a shared cleaning penalty, Shah’s fitness classes, and frequent personal conversations while serving overlapping sentences in Texas.

=== Relationship with Sunny Balwani ===
Holmes was romantically involved with the Pakistani-born technology entrepreneur Ramesh "Sunny" Balwani, who immigrated to India and then the US. She met him in the summer of 2002 during a trip to Beijing as part of a Stanford University Mandarin program. Holmes was 18 at the time, had just graduated from high school, and had not yet started attending Stanford. Balwani is 19 years older than Holmes and he was married to another woman at the time that they met.

Balwani divorced his wife in 2002, and became romantically involved with Holmes in 2003, about the same time Holmes dropped out of Stanford. The couple moved into an apartment together in 2005. Although Balwani did not officially join Theranos until 2009, when he was given the title of COO, he was advising Holmes behind the scenes from the company's inception. Balwani left Theranos in 2016 in the wake of investigations. The circumstances of his departure are unclear; Holmes has stated that she fired him, but Balwani says that he left of his own accord.

On November 29, 2021, Holmes testified that she had been raped in 2003 while she was a student at Stanford and that she sought solace from Balwani in the aftermath of the incident. She also said Balwani was very controlling during their romantic relationship, which lasted more than a decade, and at times he berated and sexually abused her. In her testimony, she stated he also wanted to "kill the person" she was and create a "new Elizabeth." However, she also testified that Balwani had not forced her to make the false statements to investors, business partners, journalists and company directors that had been described in the case. In court filings, Balwani has "categorically" denied abuse allegations, calling them "false and inflammatory."

=== Relationship with Billy Evans ===
In early 2017, Holmes met William "Billy" Evans, a 25-year-old heir to Evans Hotels, a family-owned group of hotels in the San Diego area. In 2018, they became engaged. On June 14, 2019, Vanity Fair reported that Holmes and Evans had married in a private ceremony. Holmes stated in 2025 that they had not married yet. In October 2026, the Los Angeles Times wrote that Evans "routinely" referred to Holmes as his wife.

Holmes gave birth to a son with Evans in July 2021. In October 2022, weeks before her sentencing hearing, it was reported she might have been pregnant with a second child. Holmes was accused of conceiving a second child, according to a court filing from February 2023, as a strategy for delaying the start of her prison term. Holmes denied this, saying she wanted to grow her family and the child was conceived before she was indicted, which she did not anticipate. Prior to her incarceration, she lived in the Mortimer Fleishhacker House in Woodside, California, with Evans. Holmes's relationship with Evans is central to the 2026 documentary film You Can See Everything, which saw Holmes and Evans invite filmmakers Nathan Fielder and Lance Oppenheim into their home just prior to Holmes's incarceration.

In 2024, Evans founded Haemanthus, a blood testing startup. Holmes is reported to be advising Evans on the startup from federal prison. A company statement denied any involvement on Holmes’ part. The company was co-founded by Holmes' college friend, Lauren Friedman Stat. Friedman Stat had previously written a letter to the judge in the case, United States v. Elizabeth A. Holmes, et al., to defend the character of her fellow university classmate. Friedman Stat's husband, medical doctor David Stat, also provided assistance in the founding of the company. Friedman Stat described the company's purpose as, "a way to give Holmes something to look forward to during her prison sentence".

On October 14, 2026, Evans was interviewed live on the All-In Podcast with David Friedberg. Friedberg asked him, "You're Elizabeth Holmes' husband?", to which Evans responded, "Yes, Elizabeth Holmes is my wife, and best friend, and partner." Asked about his recent life, Evans said "It's hard because I'm building a business and I'm trying to free my wife from prison and I'm raising two kids".

== In the media ==
The case of Holmes is said to have created a stigma for other female entrepreneurs, particularly in the sciences and health care industries, who are often compared to her. Writing in The New York Times, technology journalist Erin Griffith commented that "Holmes continues to loom large across the start-up world because of the audacity of her story, which has permeated popular culture", with female entrepreneurs reporting that "the frequent comparisons [to Holmes] are pernicious". Holmes has also been featured in a number of media works:

- In May 2018, author John Carreyrou released the book Bad Blood: Secrets and Lies in a Silicon Valley Startup, describing the life of Holmes and the inner workings of Theranos. The film rights to Carreyrou's book were purchased by Legendary nearly two years before the book was published.
- In January 2019, ABC News, Nightline, and Rebecca Jarvis released a podcast and documentary about the Holmes story called The Dropout. It included interviews and deposition tapes of key figures, including Holmes, Balwani, Christian Holmes (Elizabeth's brother), Tyler Shultz (Theranos whistleblower and grandson of Board Member George Shultz), Theranos board members Bill Frist, Gary Roughead, Dick Kovacevich and others. The series also featured an interview with Jeff Coopersmith, the attorney representing Balwani.
- On March 18, 2019, HBO premiered the documentary The Inventor: Out for Blood in Silicon Valley, a two-hour documentary film first shown at the Sundance Film Festival on January 24, 2019. It portrays the claims and promises made by Holmes in the last years of Theranos and how ultimately the company was brought down by the weight of many falsehoods. The documentary ends in 2018, with Holmes and Balwani indicted for multiple crimes.
- In June 2021, on season 7 episode 12 of the US comedy-drama Younger, a musical number is featured about famous scammers, in which Elizabeth Stanley portrays Holmes.
- In March 2022, Hulu released The Dropout, a miniseries based on the podcast of the same name. The series starred Amanda Seyfried as Holmes, a role for which she received a Primetime Emmy Award and a Golden Globe Award.
- In May 2023, Holmes gave her first interview in seven years to The New York Times. The interview was published while she was preparing to go to prison.
- In 2025, Holmes resurfaced with an interview from prison, in which she stated that she still intended to revolutionize the medical testing industry.
- On September 6, 2026, You Can See Everything, an A24 documentary depicting Holmes in the weeks before she began her prison sentence, premiered in a surprise screening at the Telluride Film Festival. The film was co-directed by Nathan Fielder and Lance Oppenheim and debuted in theaters on October 16.
