= Mortimer Fleishhacker House =

Historic house in California, United States

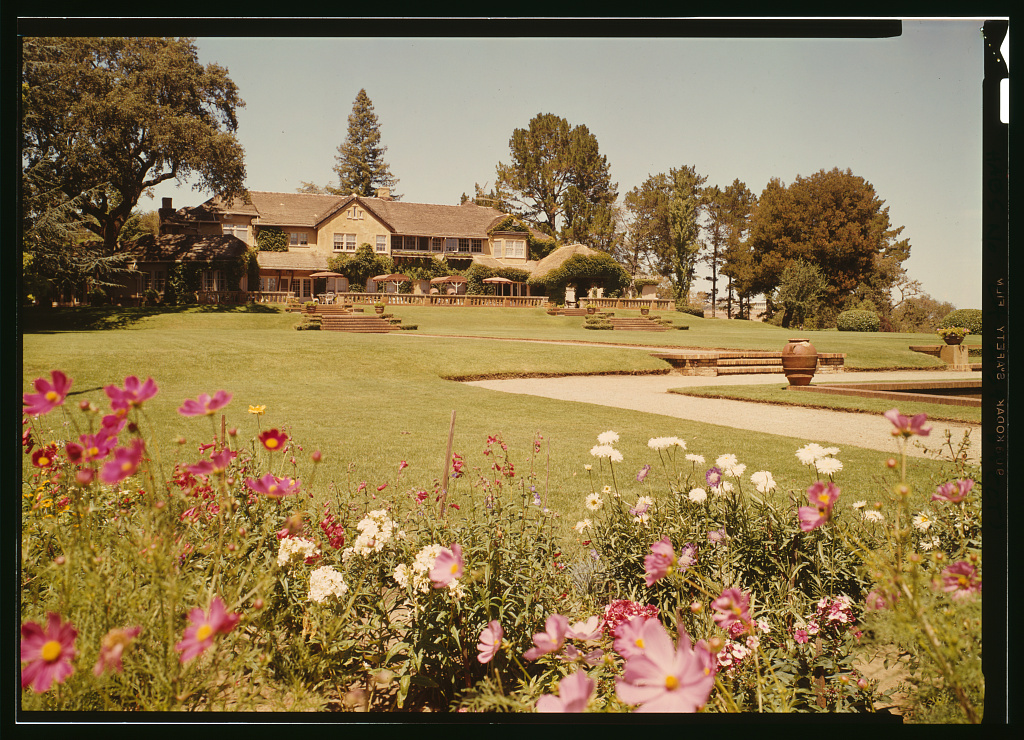
- Mortimer Fleishhacker House (1933)

- Fleishhacker House Mortimer Fleishhacker House (California)
- 37.432792°N 122.268711°W
- Location: 329 Albion Avenue, Woodside, California

History
- Built for: Mortimer Fleishhacker Sr. Bella Gerstle Fleishhacker

Site notes
- Architect: Greene and Greene
- Governing body: National Trust for Historic Preservation

U.S. National Register of Historic Places
- Official name: Green Gables – Fleischhacker
- Designated: September 26, 1986
- Reference no.: 86002396

The Mortimer Fleishhacker House, also known as the Green Gables Estate, is a historic estate with an English manor house, built between 1911 and 1935, and located at 329 Albion Avenue in Woodside, California. The house has been listed on the National Register of Historic Places since September 26, 1986.

The main house is two stories tall, and was created in an English manor-style with an imitation thatch roof, a gunite exterior, and 10 bedrooms. The garden is Italian style and features four levels of terracing, a lily pond, a Roman reflecting pool, and a piano-shaped swimming pool.

== History ==
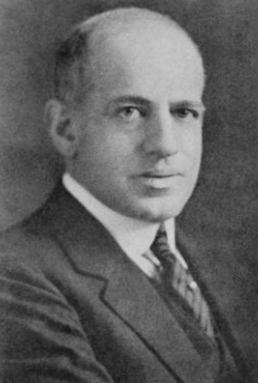
Mortimer Fleishhacker Sr.

=== The Fleishhacker family ===
Mortimer Fleishhacker Sr. (1866–1953) was an entrepreneur who co-founded (with his brother Herbert Fleishhacker) the Great Western Power utility company, which later became part of Pacific Gas and Electric and the City Electric Company. He served as a director of the San Francisco Opera, San Francisco Symphony, the Museum of Modern Art, and the Temple Emanu-El. Fleishhacker had a second home at 2418 Pacific Avenue in the Pacific Heights neighborhood of San Francisco, California.

The Green Gables Estate was used by and remained in the Fleishhacker family for five generations.

=== Property and landscaping ===
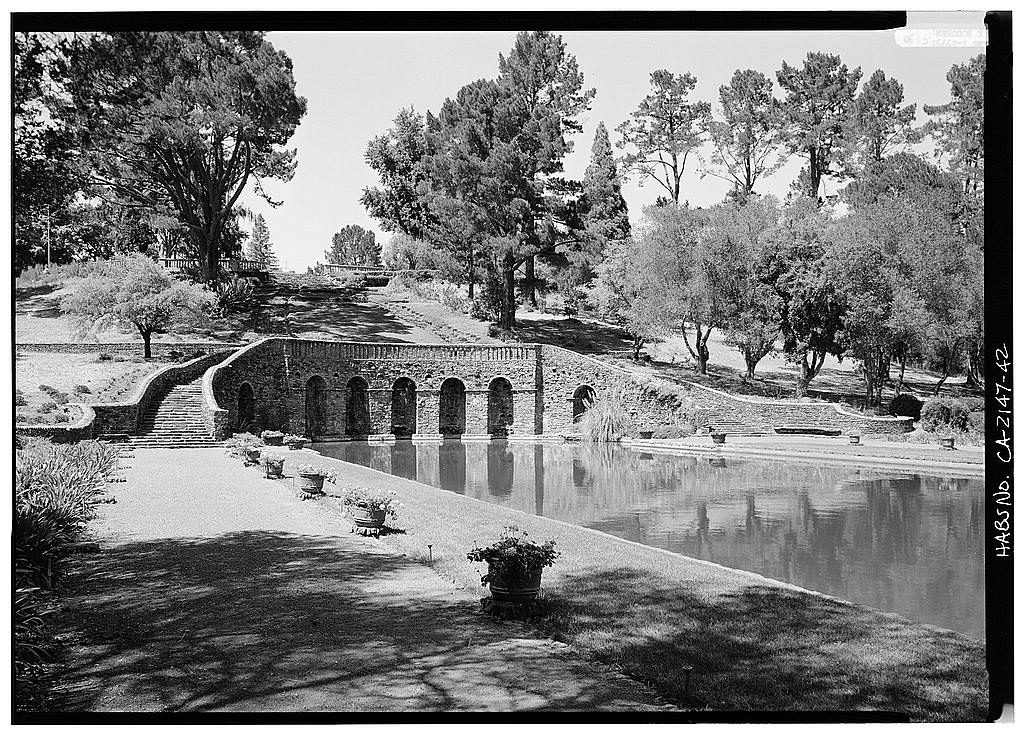
Mortimer Fleishhacker House Roman Pool (1933)

In 1911, Fleishhacker Sr. and his wife Bella Gerstle Fleishhacker (1875–1963), commissioned Charles Sumner Greene of the architectural firm Greene and Greene to design a country home for them on a 45-acre property. This was the largest of all Greene and Greene designs. The interior of the house was designed by Elsie de Wolfe and the San Francisco design house of Vickery, Atkins and Torrey. When designing the home, Greene also took into account the design of the landscaping and the driveway.

The property's rolling green lawns were inspired by the Fountains Abbey of Studley Royal Park in 18th-century England, which Greene had visited in 1909. The garden has used natural materials and design elements that complement the landscape such as terraces, walls, arcades, balustrades, and planting urns. Over the years, the Fleishhacker family built out the estate, adding new structures and land.

=== Modern history ===
The property was used to host family weddings, corporate retreats, and historic summits; including a United Nations 20th-anniversary gala in 1965. The estate was filmed as the Martin family home in the 1999 film Bicentennial Man.

Theranos CEO Elizabeth Holmes rented a house on the property with her partner Billy Evans from March 2021 until November 2022.

In 2025, the house was sold for $85 million and remains a private residence, with its original 74-acre parcel intact.

== See also ==
- National Register of Historic Places listings in San Mateo County, California
- Herbert Fleishhacker
