= Icy Blu =

American recording artist (born 1974)

- Born: Laurel Yurchick; June 1, 1974 (age 52); Austin, Texas
- Genre: Pop rap
- Occupations: Rapper, singer
- Years active: 1991–1992
- Label: Giant Records

Laurel Yurchick (born June 1, 1974), known as Icy Blu, is an American recording artist who had a brief pop career in the early 1990s.

== Career ==
In 1991, Icy Blu released a self-titled album containing the singles "Pump It (Nice an' Hard)" and "I Wanna Be Your Girl". Both singles entered the Billboard Hot 100 chart, peaking at numbers 78 and 46, respectively. "Pump It (Nice an' Hard)", which samples Salt-N-Pepa's "Push It", reached the top 10 in Australia and New Zealand, and was the 40th highest-selling single of 1991 in Australia.

== Personal life ==
In April 2021, the United States Attorney's Office of the Western District of Texas announced that Yurchick was one of 21 people that had been indicted for conspiracy to possess with intent to distribute kilogram quantities of methamphetamine in Texas and elsewhere from August 2019 to March 2021. Yurchick subsequently pleaded guilty to that charge on February 1, 2022. U.S. District Judge Earl Leroy Yeakel III sentenced Yurchick to 121 months of confinement in the Federal Bureau of Prisons, with the Judge recommending incarceration at Federal Prison Camp, Bryan, followed by four years of supervised release under the supervision of the U.S. Probation and Pretrial Services System.

== Discography ==
=== Albums ===
Album	Details	Peak chart positions
Album	Details	AUS
Icy Blu	Released: October 1991; Label: Giant Records, Reprise, Warner; Format: CD, Cassette, LP	100

=== Singles ===
Year	Single	Peak chart positions			Album
Year	Single	US	AUS	NZ	Album
1991	"Pump It (Nice an' Hard)"	78	8	4	Icy Blu
1991	"I Wanna Be Your Girl"	46	88	15	Icy Blu
