= Eleftherios Diamandis =

Greek Cypriot-Canadian biochemist

Eleftherios Diamandis FRCPC FRSC
- Ελευθέριος Διαμαντής
- Born: Eleftherios Phedias Diamandis; October 8, 1952 (age 74); Limassol, Cyprus
- Citizenship: Canada; Cyprus
- Education: University of Athens (BS, PhD, MD)
- Known for: Research on cancer biomarkers
- Spouse: Anastasia
- Children: 2
- Scientific career
- Fields: Clinical chemistry
- Workplaces: University of Toronto

Eleftherios Phedias Diamandis (born October 8, 1952) is a Greek Cypriot-Canadian biochemist who specializes in clinical chemistry. He is Professor & Head of Clinical Biochemistry in the Department of Laboratory Medicine and Pathobiology at the University of Toronto in Toronto, Ontario, Canada. He is also Division Head of Clinical Biochemistry at Mount Sinai Hospital and Biochemist-in-Chief at the University Health Network, both of which are also located in Toronto.

== Honors and awards ==
Diamandis is a member of the Academy of Athens and the Royal Society of Canada. He is also a fellow of the American Association for the Advancement of Science, the Canadian Academy of Health Sciences, and the Royal College of Physicians and Surgeons of Canada. From the American Association for Clinical Chemistry, he has received the Morton K. Schwartz Award for Significant Contributions in Cancer Research Diagnostics, among other awards; he is also a member of the Association's Hall of Fame.

== Theranos ==
In May 2015, Diamandis performed a deep investigation into claims of health technology company Theranos and concluded in a report that "most of the company's claims are exaggerated." This insight from Diamandis triggered John Carreyrou to further investigate the claims that had been made by Theranos. At the time, Theranos was widely considered a reliable and functional analysis company.
