= Bad Blood: Secrets and Lies in a Silicon Valley Startup =

2018 book by John Carreyrou

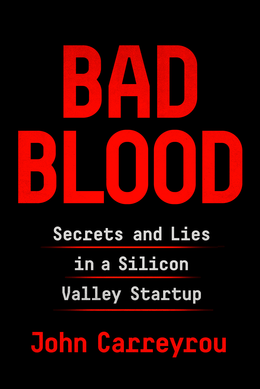
- Author: John Carreyrou
- Subject: Theranos
- Published: May 21, 2018
- Publisher: Alfred A. Knopf
- ISBN: 978-1-5247-3165-6
- OCLC: 1029779381
- Dewey Decimal: 338.7/681761
- LC Class: HD9995.H423 U627 2018

Bad Blood: Secrets and Lies in a Silicon Valley Startup is a nonfiction book by journalist John Carreyrou, released May 21, 2018. It covers the rise and fall of Theranos, the multibillion-dollar biotech startup headed by Elizabeth Holmes. The book received critical acclaim, winning the 2018 Financial Times and McKinsey Business Book of the Year Award.

In 2016, a film adaptation was announced, to star Jennifer Lawrence, to be written by Vanessa Taylor and to be directed by Adam McKay. However, after seeing Amanda Seyfried's critically acclaimed performance playing Holmes in the limited series The Dropout, Lawrence exited the project.

== Development ==
In late 2015, Carreyrou began a series of investigative articles on Theranos, published in The Wall Street Journal on the blood-testing startup founded by Elizabeth Holmes. The articles questioned the company's claim to be able to run a wide range of lab tests from a tiny sample of blood from a finger prick. In May 2018 Bad Blood: Secrets and Lies in a Silicon Valley Startup was published by Knopf.

In 2021, Carreyrou released a podcast called "Bad Blood: The Final Chapter" covering the trial of Elizabeth Holmes.

== Critical reception ==
While Roger Lowenstein from The New York Times conceded that "Carreyrou's presentation has a few minor flaws"—such as an excessive number of characters and occasional reliance on stereotypes—he concluded that "such blemishes in no way detract from the power of Bad Blood", and that "the author compellingly relates how he got involved" and "is admirably frank about his craft". He added, "The author's description of Holmes as a manic leader who turned coolly hostile when challenged is ripe material for a psychologist; Carreyrou wisely lets the evidence speak for itself." Kevin Nguyen with GQ magazine likewise called "Carreyrou’s reporting ... exhaustive, including interviews with more than 150 people", and said "the book stumbles a bit in its third act, when Carreyrou introduces himself and how he broke the story". However, he continued by saying that "these are small issues in a book that speaks volumes to tech at large", and that, "Bad Blood is a satisfying read for anyone who wants a book full of salacious startupenfreude."

Charles Harry with the Library Journal said "Carreyrou's clearly written and accessible work can be compared to another outstanding business exposé, James B. Stewart’s Den of Thieves," and "highly recommended for all collections". Danny Crichton, with TechCrunch, said "Carreyrou's tenacious and intrepid reporting at The Wall Street Journal would ultimately expose one of the largest frauds ever perpetrated in Silicon Valley ... And yet, what I found in the book was not all that thrilling or shocking, but rather astonishingly pedestrian." He explained, "Carreyrou's laconic WSJ tone, with its 'just the facts' attitude ... is punctuated only occasionally by brief interludes on the motivations and psychology of its characters", and that it "lacks the sort of verve that makes business thrillers like Barbarians at the Gate or Red Notice so engaging".

Bill Gates said: "Bad Blood tackles some serious ethical questions, but it is ultimately a thriller with a tragic ending. It's a fun read full of bizarre details that will make you gasp out loud."

The book was included on end-of-year lists, including the New York Post's list of the 28 most unforgettable books of 2018, NPR's Guide To 2018's Great Reads, and The New York Times Book Review's 100 Notable Books of 2018. The book also won the 2018 Financial Times and McKinsey Business Book of the Year Award.

== Editions ==
- John Carreyrou (May 21, 2018). Bad Blood: Secrets and Lies in a Silicon Valley Startup. Penguin Random House. ISBN 9781524731656.
