= Trial of Elizabeth Holmes =

Criminal fraud case

United States v. Holmes
- Court: United States District Court for the Northern District of California
- Full case name: United States v. Elizabeth A. Holmes, et al.
- Decided: January 3, 2022

Court membership
- Judge sitting: Edward J. Davila

United States v. Elizabeth A. Holmes, et al., (No. 18-CR-00258-EJD) was a United States federal criminal fraud case against Elizabeth Holmes, the founder of the now-defunct health-technology corporation Theranos, and Ramesh "Sunny" Balwani, its former president and COO. The case alleged that Holmes and Balwani perpetrated multi-million dollar wire-fraud schemes against investors and patients. They had separate jury trials.

A five-person team from the white-collar crime litigation firm Williams & Connolly defended Holmes. The case began on August 31, 2021, when a jury of Northern California residents was selected. The jury reached a split verdict on January 3, 2022, with Holmes found guilty of criminal fraud on four counts. On November 18, 2022, she was sentenced to 11.25 years (135 months) in prison. She started her 11-year prison sentence on May 30, 2023.

Balwani had the same charges as Holmes. On July 7, 2022, Balwani was found guilty on all counts and also faced up to 20 years in prison and millions of dollars in restitution. On December 7, 2022 he was sentenced to 12 years and 11 months, plus three years of probation, and surrendered on April 20, 2023.

Holmes and Balwani were further ordered to pay $452 million to the victims of the fraud, with responsibility for the amount shared between them.

== Background ==
Founded by Holmes in 2003, Theranos was a company that claimed to revolutionize blood testing by developing testing methods that could use surprisingly small volumes of blood, such as from a fingerprick. The decline of Theranos began in 2015, when a series of journalistic and regulatory investigations revealed doubts about the company's technology claims and whether Holmes had misled investors and the government. In 2018, the U.S. Securities and Exchange Commission charged Theranos and Holmes with deceiving investors by "massive fraud" through false or exaggerated claims about the accuracy of the company's blood-testing technology. Holmes settled the charges by paying a $500,000 fine, returning 18.9 million shares to the company, relinquishing her voting control of Theranos, and being barred from serving as an officer or director of a public company for ten years.

Balwani was in a romantic relationship with Holmes during his tenure at Theranos. Holmes met him in 2002 at age 18. He was 37 at the time. Their relationship was not disclosed to their Theranos investors. Balwani faced the same charges as Holmes and pleaded not guilty.

== Pre-trial ==
On June 15, 2018, following an investigation by the U.S. Attorney's Office for the Northern District of California in San Francisco that lasted more than two years, a federal grand jury indicted Holmes and Balwani on nine counts of wire fraud and two counts of conspiracy to commit wire fraud. Both pleaded not guilty. Prosecutors alleged that Holmes and Balwani engaged in two criminal schemes, one to defraud investors, the other to defraud doctors and patients. After the indictment was issued, Holmes stepped down as CEO of Theranos but remained chair of the board.

In June 2019, Bloomberg News reported Holmes and Balwani were looking into a possible defense strategy of blaming the media for the downfall of Theranos and whether journalist John Carreyrou's reporting caused undue influence upon government regulatory agencies in order to write a sensational story for The Wall Street Journal. Later unsealed documents indicated Holmes's plans to blame Balwani, who "dominated" her to such an extent she was unable to make her own decisions: "Ms. Holmes plans to introduce evidence that Mr. Balwani verbally disparaged her and withdrew ‘affection if she displeased him’; controlled what she ate, how she dressed, how much money she could spend, who she could interact with – essentially dominating her and erasing her capacity to make decisions." Holmes was also reported to be preparing a "mental defect" defense, to explain why she was dominated by Balwani.

In October 2019, The Mercury News reported that Cooley LLP, Holmes's legal team in a class-action civil case, requested that the court allow them to stop representing her, stating that she had not paid them in a year for services, and that "given Ms. Holmes's current financial situation, Cooley has no expectation that Ms. Holmes will ever pay it for its services as her counsel." In November 2019, Law.com reported that Senior District Judge H. Russel Holland, who was overseeing the civil case, indicated that he would allow Cooley to withdraw.

In February 2020, Holmes's defense requested a federal court to drop all charges against her and her co-defendant Balwani. This was not done, but a federal judge ruled in favor of the defense that four charges would be dropped: one count of conspiracy to commit wire fraud and three counts of wire fraud. These were in relation to doctors and "non-paying customers"; since some Theranos blood tests were paid for by medical insurance companies, these patients were not deprived of any money or property; nor were the doctors deprived of money. Still, patients who either paid in full or paid a copayment for a blood test would be considered as possible fraud victims. As such, the judge kept the 11 charges of wire fraud for investors and paying patients.

In May 2020, prosecutors added a twelfth fraud charge concerning test results from a patient in Arizona. In July 2020, prosecutors filed a third superseding indictment that removed the twelfth charge, settling on a final 11 indictments comprising 7 for investors and 4 for patients.

In late August 2020, Holmes's legal team filed new motions seeking the dismissal of seven of the felony fraud charges, claiming that Judge Edward Davila had made a mistake about her obligations to the Theranos investors. The charges were not dismissed.

In September 2020, Bloomberg News reported that Holmes was exploring a "mental disease" defense for her criminal fraud trial when the judge overseeing the case ruled that government prosecutors would be allowed to examine Holmes.

In February 2021, federal government prosecutors accused Holmes and other executives of destroying evidence in Theranos's final days in business. The attorney for Holmes argued the government was to blame for their failure to preserve critical evidence. The specific evidence in question concerned the company's history of internal testing, including the accuracy and failure rates of Theranos's blood-testing systems.

== Holmes ==
=== Proceedings ===
Holmes was charged with two counts of conspiracy to commit wire fraud in violation of 18 U.S.C § 1349 and nine charges of wire fraud in violation of 18 U.S.C §1343. The case was prosecuted by the United States Attorney for the Northern District of California, with Holmes being defended by white-collar crime litigation firm Williams & Connolly. The case began on August 31, 2021, after being delayed for over a year due to the COVID-19 pandemic and Holmes's pregnancy. A jury of residents from Northern California was selected, eventually consisting of 8 men and 4 women. Two of the jurors were replaced during the trial, one for playing Sudoku and another for her Buddhist faith.

There were dozens of witnesses, including James Mattis. Other prominent investors and/or board members were discussed but not called into court, including Betsy DeVos, Rupert Murdoch, Larry Ellison, George Shultz, and Henry Kissinger. Other witnesses include former employees, including a lab director, who said "I found these instruments to be unsuitable for clinical use". Erika Cheung, a former Theranos employee, said she was very concerned about the accuracy of the technology.

Evidence was provided of Holmes's role in faked product demonstrations, falsified validation reports, misleading claims about contracts, and overstated financials. There was audio and video evidence of Holmes making inflated or misleading claims about Theranos. There were forged documents saying Pfizer and Schering-Plough had validated the company's blood-testing technology. Holmes admitted to personally manipulating those documents.

Holmes took the stand in her defense for seven days. She deflected blame to others, or accepted it in some cases. She explained to the jury her vision of a future at Theranos, saying it was not a crime to be optimistic about the possibilities of the technology that she herself was misled about by her own expert staff. Holmes testified that she had been raped while she was a student at Stanford and that she had sought solace from Balwani in the aftermath of the incident. She also said that Balwani sought control over her during their romantic relationship, which was still ongoing when the alleged criminal acts took place, and at times berated and sexually abused her. However, she also testified that Balwani had not forced her to make the false statements to investors, business partners, journalists and company directors that had been described in the case.

Prosecutors argued her culpability crossed into fraud when she lied about the accuracy, types and number of tests Theranos's machines could do, "At so many of the forks in the road, she chose the dishonest path," said an attorney during closing arguments.

=== Verdict ===
On January 3, 2022, Holmes was found guilty on four counts of defrauding investors: three counts of wire fraud, and one of conspiracy to commit wire fraud. She was found not guilty on four counts of defrauding patients. The jury returned a "no verdict" on three counts of wire fraud against investors; the judge declared a mistrial on those counts because the jury failed to agree unanimously on a verdict and the government at its discretion declined to have a retrial. It contrasted with the verdict against Balwani, who was found guilty on all counts.

=== Sentencing ===
Holmes waited for sentencing while on $500,000 bail, secured on property. She faced a maximum sentence of twenty years in prison, and a fine of $250,000, plus restitution, for each count of wire fraud and for each conspiracy count. Prosecutors sought 15 years in prison, a three-year supervised release and restitution of $800 million.

On January 12, the judge scheduled sentencing for September 26, 2022, which was after the conclusion of the Balwani trial; the results of that trial might influence the sentencing decision. In July, the sentencing was rescheduled to October 17 with no reason given for the delay. A few days prior to the rescheduling, Holmes had asked the judge to acquit because she maintained "no rational juror could have found" her guilty beyond a reasonable doubt. On September 6, 2022, Holmes requested a new trial because of new evidence. A judge denied the new trial, saying the new evidence was not material enough to change the outcome.

On November 18, 2022, Holmes was sentenced to 11.25 years (135 months) in prison. The sentence included a fine of $400, or $100 for each count of fraud, and a three-year supervised release after the prison term was served. She could get about a 15% reduction on prison time with good behavior, which would put her sentence at 9 1/2 years with no possibility for parole. She would start her 11-year prison sentence on May 30, 2023, following the request Holmes's lawyers made to allow her to travel out of state and prepare child care. Judge Edward Davila recommended she be incarcerated at Federal Prison Camp, Bryan, in Texas, a minimum security facility with limited or no perimeter fencing. "No one wants to get kicked out because compared to other places in the prison system, this place is heaven. If you have to go it's a good place to go," said a criminal defense lawyer.

In May 2023, during the restitution phase, she was ordered to pay $452 million to the victims of the fraud, with the responsibility for the amount shared between her and Balwani.

=== Jury reactions ===
After the verdict, some members of the jury spoke publicly about the case. Juror Wayne Kaatz said, "It's tough to convict somebody, especially somebody so likable, with such a positive dream. [We] respected Elizabeth's belief in her technology, in her dream. [We thought], 'She still believes in it, and we still believe she believes in it." Kaatz said the jury found Holmes's seven-day testimony to be "non credible". He said the jury ranked each witness's testimony on a scale of one to four, with one being the least credible. Holmes scored a two. Kaatz said while the jury quickly concluded she was guilty of fraud against investors, they were not convinced she was fraudulent of patients, as they were "one-step removed" from the CEO.

=== Post-trial ===
On March 17, 2023, Holmes appeared in court to request she remain out on bail while she appealed her conviction. After her conviction, Holmes and her partner allegedly attempted to flee, according to prosecutors, when they bought one-way plane tickets to Mexico. Holmes's legal team said they bought the tickets with the hope the outcome of the case would have been different, and that she canceled her ticket after losing the case; her partner went on to Mexico without her. Judge Davila ruled it was a "bold" and "ill-advised" action, but not an attempt to flee. He also denied her request to remain free on bail while she appealed her conviction.

In April 2023, Holmes appealed her conviction, citing, in part, Judge Davila's evidentiary ruling that she could not refer to Balwani's testimony in her own defense and that the defense could not cross examine one witness about the failings of other labs in which he had worked. Holmes asked the district court to delay her prison-term start date pending the appeal. Separately, prosecutors requested Holmes to repay $878 million to Theranos investors, representing the entirety of all investments made into the company.

As to Holmes's request for a delay term of incarceration, the district court ruled Holmes's appeal had failed to raise "substantial questions of law or fact". Holmes also appealed that decision, which triggered an automatic delay of her term of incarceration. The appeal was rejected in May 2023.

=== Appeal ===
On 11 June 2024, Holmes' legal representatives submitted on her behalf an appeal before the United States Court of Appeals for the Ninth Circuit, arguing that judge Edward Davila "erred in several decisions" in her trial. The Ninth Circuit officially rejected Holmes's appeal and affirmed her 2022 fraud conviction, sentence, and $452 million restitution order. Her subsequent request for a rehearing was also denied in May 2025.

=== Importance of case ===
According to The New York Times, the case "came to symbolize the pitfalls of Silicon Valley's culture of hustle, hype and greed." It should serve as a warning to other Silicon Valley start-ups that stretch the truth to secure funding. Holmes "would be the most notable female executive to serve time since Martha Stewart did in 2004 after lying to investigators about a stock sale".

== Balwani ==
=== Proceedings ===
Jury selection began on March 9. Opening arguments were expected to start on March 15, but were delayed when the judge adjourned proceedings due to COVID-19 exposure by someone in attendance in the courtroom. Balwani was charged with two counts of conspiracy to commit wire fraud in violation of 18 U.S.C § 1349 and ten charges of wire fraud in violation of 18 U.S.C §1343. The case was prosecuted by the United States Attorney for the Northern District of California.

During opening arguments, Balwani's legal team argued he was only an investor, however the prosecution presented a text from Balwani to Holmes in which he said, "I am responsible for everything at Theranos", contradicting his earlier claim. The government called 24 witnesses, and Balwani's defense called 2; Balwani himself did not testify. Prosecutors maintained Balwani was responsible for the lofty financial projections that investors relied on. For example, Balwani told investors Theranos would generate $1 billion in revenue by 2015 as a result of a deal with Walgreens. Prosecutors said Balwani had in fact "duped" Walgreens into the business relationship, because it was useful for recruiting other investors, a "house of cards"; Walgreens terminated its relationship with Theranos in 2016. Prosecutors attempted to show that Balwani knew about the problems in Theranos's technology and business while deceiving investors and patients. Balwani's defense maintained he "acted in good faith to make blood testing more accessible, more convenient and more affordable to everyone" and had not engaged in fraud.

=== Verdict ===
On July 7, 2022, the jury returned a verdict of guilty on all 12 counts. It included two counts of conspiring with Holmes, six counts of defrauding investors and four counts of patient fraud. This contrasted with the verdict against Holmes which was mixed.

=== Sentencing ===
Balwani faced up to 20 years in prison and millions of dollars in restitution. On December 7, 2022 he was sentenced to 12 years and 11 months, plus three years of probation, with a surrender date by March 15, 2023. Balwani later appealed this ruling, which triggered an automatic stay of his sentence. On April 7, 2023, the Ninth Circuit Court of Appeals refused Balwani's request, and a new self-surrender date was set for April 20. He surrendered on that date.

In May 2023, during the restitution phase, he was ordered to pay $452 million to the victims of the fraud, with the responsibility for the amount shared between him and Holmes.
