= Theranos =

American health-technology company, 2003–2018

Theranos Inc.
- Formerly: Real-Time Cures (2003)
- Type: Private
- Industry: Health care
- Founded: 2003
- Founder: Elizabeth Holmes
- Defunct: September 2018 (Note: Sources have reported that Theranos became defunct on September 4 due to an email sent by then-CEO David Taylor to Theranos shareholders. Other reports state that Theranos remained active until its patents and most of its remaining assets were transferred to Fortress Investment Group the following week on September 12.)
- Fate: Dissolved and liquidated; founder convicted (January 2022) of wire fraud and conspiracy and sentenced to 11 1/4 years (135 months) in prison
- Headquarters: Palo Alto, California, United States
- Key people: Elizabeth Holmes (chairwoman and CEO); Sunny Balwani (president and COO); Ian Gibbons (CSO); Channing Robertson (technical advisor)
- Products: Blood tests
- Services: Medical tests
- Website: theranos.com at the Wayback Machine (archived August 28, 2018)

Theranos Inc. (Note: Pronounced /ˈθɛr.ən.oʊs/ THAIR-ən-ohss, being a portmanteau of "therapy" and "diagnose".) was an American privately held corporation that was touted as a breakthrough health technology company. Founded in 2003 by 19-year-old Elizabeth Holmes, Theranos raised more than US$700 million from venture capitalists and private investors, resulting in a $9 billion valuation at its peak in 2013 and 2014. The company falsely claimed that it had devised blood tests that could be performed rapidly and accurately while requiring very small amounts of blood, all using compact automated devices that the company had developed.

A turning point came in 2015, when medical research professor John Ioannidis, and later, professor of clinical biochemistry Eleftherios Diamandis, along with investigative journalist John Carreyrou of The Wall Street Journal, questioned the validity of Theranos's technology. The company faced a string of legal and commercial challenges from medical authorities, investors, the U.S. Securities and Exchange Commission (SEC), the Centers for Medicare and Medicaid Services (CMS), state attorneys general, former business partners, patients, and others. By June 2016, Forbes estimated that Holmes' personal net worth had dropped from $4.5 billion to "nothing". After several years of struggle, lawsuits, and sanctions from CMS, what remained of the company was dissolved in September 2018.

Theranos, Holmes, and former company president Sunny Balwani were charged with fraud by the SEC in 2018. Holmes and Balwani were also charged with wire fraud and conspiracy, with Holmes being found guilty on four counts in January 2022 and sentenced that November to 11 years and 3 months in prison. Balwani was convicted on all 12 counts brought against him in July 2022, and in December 2022 was sentenced to 12 years and 11 months in prison and 3 years of probation.

== History ==
=== Early years ===
While an undergraduate student at Stanford University, Holmes had an idea to develop a wearable patch that could adjust the dosage of drug delivery and notify doctors of variables in patients' blood, including infections, cancers, and hematologic abnormalities. She started developing lab-on-a-chip technology for blood tests, with the idea to start a company that would make blood tests cheaper, more convenient and accessible to consumers. Holmes dropped out of Stanford in 2003 and used the education trust from her parents to found the company that would later be called Theranos, derived from a combination of the words "therapy" and "diagnosis". The original name was "Real-Time Cures", which Holmes changed after deciding that people were skeptical of the word "cure".

By December 2004, Holmes had raised $6 million to fund the firm. By the end of 2010, Theranos had more than $92 million in venture capital. In July 2011, Holmes was introduced to former US secretary of state George Shultz. After a two-hour meeting, he joined the Theranos board of directors. Holmes was recognized for forming "the most illustrious board in U.S. corporate history" over the next three years.

=== Partnerships ===
In 2012, Safeway invested $350 million into retrofitting 800 locations with clinics that would offer in-store blood tests. After many missed deadlines and questionable results from a trial clinic at Safeway's corporate offices, the deal was terminated in 2015. In 2013, Theranos partnered with Walgreens to offer in-store blood tests at more than 40 locations. Although Theranos blood tests were reportedly used on drug trial patients for GlaxoSmithKline and Pfizer, both companies stated in October 2015 that there were no active projects with Theranos. In June 2016, Walgreens terminated its partnership with Theranos. In November 2016, it filed a suit against Theranos in federal court in Delaware for breach of contract. In June 2017, Theranos reported to investors that the suit, which originally sought $140 million in damages, was settled for less than $30 million.

In March 2015, the Cleveland Clinic announced a partnership with Theranos to test its technology and decrease the cost of lab tests. In July 2015, Theranos became the lab-work provider for Pennsylvania insurers AmeriHealth Caritas and Capital Blue Cross. The same month, the Food and Drug Administration approved the use of the company's fingerstick blood testing device for the herpes simplex virus (HSV-1) outside a clinical laboratory setting. Theranos was named the 2015 Bioscience Company of the Year by the Arizona BioIndustry Association (AzBio).

=== Exposure and downfall ===
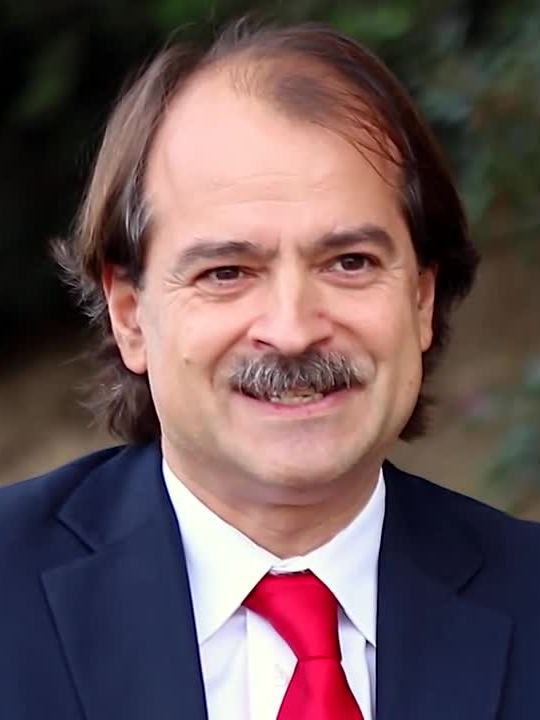
John Ioannidis

In February 2015, Stanford professor John Ioannidis wrote in the Journal of the American Medical Association that no peer-reviewed research from Theranos had been published in medical research literature. In May 2015, University of Toronto Professor Eleftherios Diamandis analyzed Theranos technology and concluded that "most of the company's claims are exaggerated". Attempting to boost the company's credibility, Holmes invited then–U.S. Vice President Joe Biden to tour their facility. Biden praised what he saw, but to conceal the lab's true operating conditions, Holmes and Balwani had created a fake lab for the Vice President's tour.

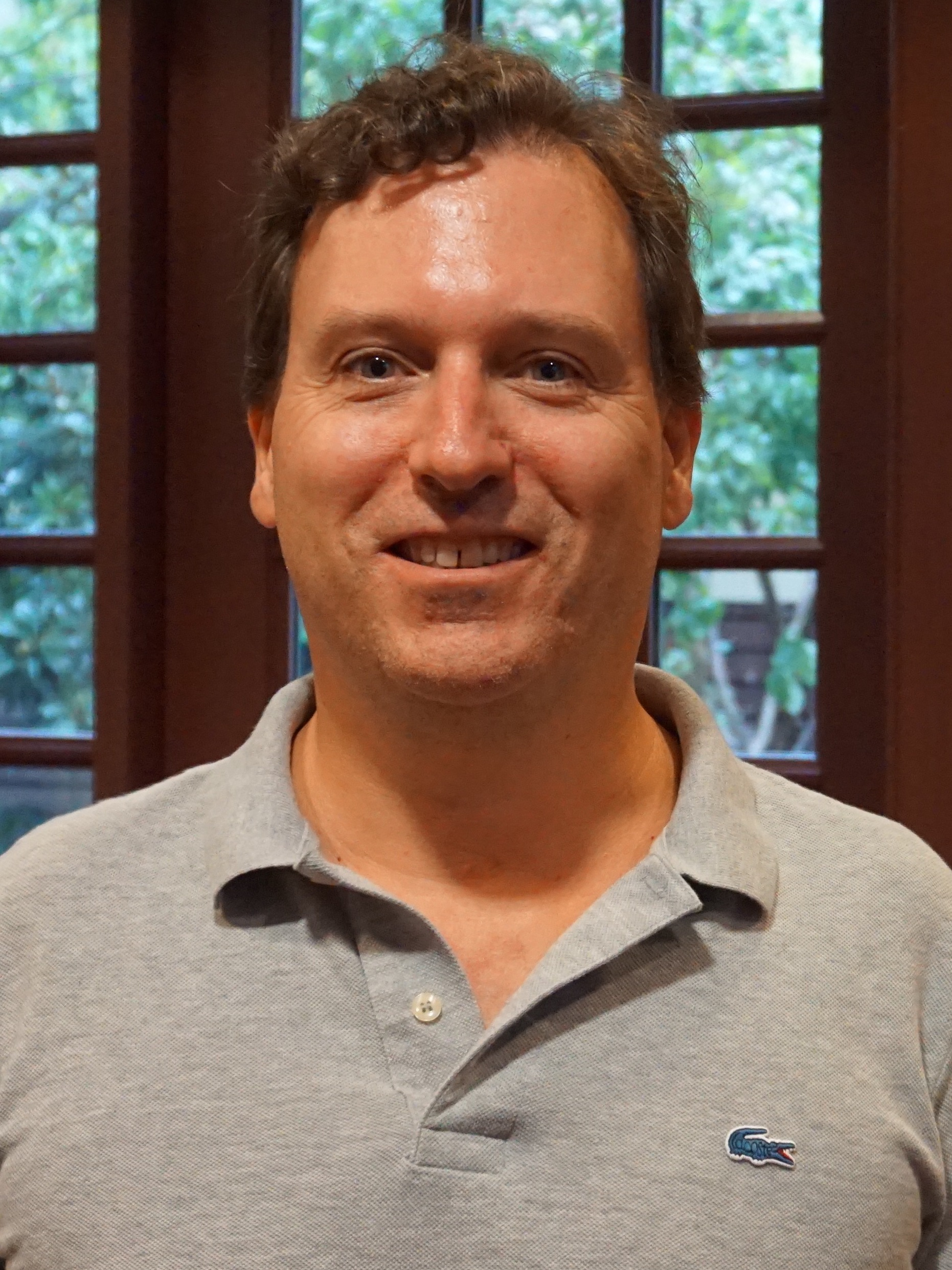
John Carreyrou

In October 2015, John Carreyrou of The Wall Street Journal reported that Theranos was using traditional blood testing machines instead of the company's Edison devices to run its tests, and that the company's Edison machines might provide inaccurate or wholly false results. Tyler Shultz, a Theranos employee from 2013 to 2014 and the grandson of then–Theranos director, former U.S. Secretary of State George P. Shultz, was a key source for the WSJ story. Shultz had attempted to take his concerns to company management. When that failed, he had spoken to Carreyrou and also, under an alias, reported the company to the New York State Department of Health for CLIA violations.

Theranos claimed that the allegations were "factually and scientifically erroneous". Walgreens suspended plans to expand blood-testing centers in their stores following the report. At that time, the Cleveland Clinic announced that it would work to verify Theranos technology. Theranos fought back against the Journal's investigation, sending lawyers after sources in the story, including Shultz, in an effort to stop them from providing information to the press. Former employees of reputation management firm Status Labs said that Theranos had hired the firm to discreetly erase mentions of the WSJ's reporting from its Wikipedia article, in violation of the website's terms of use.

Following the WSJ story, the history of FDA interactions with Theranos was scrutinized. The FDA had received a formal inquiry to look at Theranos blood test devices by the U.S. Department of Defense in 2012, when the devices were not yet commercially available and therefore did not require FDA approval. FDA inspection reports from 2014 and 2015 stated that its containers for blood collection were "not validated under actual or simulated use conditions" and "were not reviewed and not approved by designated individual(s) prior to issuance".

In 2015, an FDA inspection resulted in multiple observed violations of FDA Title 21 Regulations. It was eventually revealed that the FDA had classified Theranos's device, called a nanotainer, as a Class II medical device, meaning that Theranos would need to use special labels, meet certain performance standards and perform post-market surveillance of the device. Theranos asserted that the nanotainer was a Class I medical device and therefore not subject to any regulatory requirements. After the 2015 inspection, Theranos announced that it would voluntarily suspend its tests apart from the FDA-approved herpes simplex virus (HSV-1) test.

The Arizona Department of Health Services reported issues with the company's Scottsdale lab meeting regulations in September 2015. The reports were revealed in the Arizona Republic in November 2015. In January 2016, the Centers for Medicare and Medicaid Services (CMS) sent a letter to Theranos based on a 2015 inspection of its Newark, California, lab, reporting that the facility caused "immediate jeopardy to patient health and safety" due to a test to determine the correct dose of the blood-thinning drug warfarin. Walgreens subsequently announced a suspension of Theranos blood tests from the Newark lab and immediately paused wellness services in Palo Alto. Theranos also agreed to stop tests at the Capital Blue Cross retail store in Enola, Pennsylvania.

In the four months that followed, Theranos faced further action from government agencies. CMS regulators announced plans to enact sanctions that included suspending Holmes and Balwani from owning or operating any certified clinical laboratory for two years and that they would revoke the facility's certification as a clinical laboratory. The company came under criminal investigation by federal prosecutors and the SEC for allegedly misleading investors and government officials about its technology. The U.S. House of Representatives Committee on Energy and Commerce requested information on what Theranos was doing to correct its testing inaccuracies and adherence to federal guidelines. In July 2016, Theranos announced that the CMS had revoked its Clinical Laboratory Improvement Amendments (CLIA) certificate and issued sanctions prohibiting its owners and operators from owning or operating a clinical laboratory for two years, suspension of approval to receive Medicare and Medicaid payments, and a civil monetary penalty. The company discontinued testing at its Newark location while attempting to resolve the issues. Theranos announced plans to appeal the decision by regulators to revoke its license to operate a lab in California and other sanctions.

In May 2016, Theranos announced that it had voided two years of results from its Edison device. The company announced that about 1% of test results had been voided or corrected from its proprietary machines in June 2016. Within two weeks, Walgreens formally terminated its partnership with Theranos and would close all remaining Theranos wellness centers. In August 2016, the company withdrew its request for emergency clearance of a Zika virus blood test after a lack of essential safeguards during the testing process was found by federal inspectors. Theranos announced that it would close its laboratory operations and wellness centers and lay off about 40% of its workforce to work on miniature medical testing machines in October 2016. In January 2017, Theranos announced that it had laid off a further 41% of its workforce, or approximately 155 people, and closed the last remaining blood-testing facility after the lab failed a second major U.S. regulatory inspection. Also that month, the company faced lawsuits from several different entities including Walgreens and Arizona Attorney General Mark Brnovich.

In April 2017, lawyers for Partner Investments LP and two other funds, with combined stakes totaling more than $96 million in Theranos preferred shares, charged that Theranos had threatened to seek bankruptcy protection if the investors did not agree to accept additional stock equity in lieu of litigation. Theranos officials said the funds had mischaracterized the exchange offer, which was discussed before the suit was filed. The suit also alleged that Theranos had misled company directors about its practices concerning laboratory testing and that it had secretly bought lab equipment to run fake demonstrations. On May 1, 2017, Theranos announced that it had reached an undisclosed settlement with Partner Fund Management LP (PFM). Theranos's General Counsel, David Taylor, stated: "Theranos is pleased to have resolved both lawsuits with PFM. Although we are confident that we would have prevailed at trial, resolution of these two cases allows our tender offer to go forward and enables us to return our focus where it belongs, which is on executing our business plans and delivering value for our shareholders." In April 2017, Theranos reached a settlement with CMS agreeing to stay out of the blood-testing business for at least two years in exchange for reduced penalties, and signed a consent decree with Arizona Attorney General Mark Brnovich over violations of the Arizona Consumer Fraud Act. Alleged violations included false advertisement and inaccurate blood testing. Theranos agreed to refund $4.65 million to the state's residents for Theranos blood testing services, providing a refund to every resident who had received a test, regardless of whether the test results were voided or corrected.

In August 2017, Theranos announced it had reached a settlement with Walgreens. In December 2017, Fortress Investment Group, a wholly owned company of Softbank Group, loaned $100 million to Theranos for 4% of the company. Theranos had reportedly been on the verge of bankruptcy, with the loan meant to keep the company solvent into 2018. The loan was secured by Theranos's patents. On April 10, 2018, the company laid off the majority of workers in a renewed bid to avoid bankruptcy, leaving it with fewer than 25 employees, down from a workforce of 800 at its peak. Softbank's Fortress bought up Theranos patents and later, taking advantage of the new market conditions in the midst of the COVID-19 pandemic, set up a shell company called Labrador Diagnostics, which sued one of the companies making COVID-19 tests, saying that its test violated those Theranos patents. Theranos was still being issued patents into 2019 because of the lengthy patent application process.

=== Shutdown ===
On September 4, 2018, Theranos announced in an email to investors that it would cease operations and release its assets and remaining cash to creditors after all efforts to find a buyer were fruitless. Most of the company's remaining employees had been laid off on the previous Friday, August 31. However, Theranos general counsel and new CEO David Taylor and a few support staffers remained on payroll for a few more days. Any equity investments in the company were made worthless by the shutdown. Theranos would later transfer its patents to Fortress Investment Group on September 12 in exchange for Theranos's cash assets to be distributed to creditors.

=== Civil and criminal proceedings ===
In March 2018, the US Securities and Exchange Commission filed civil fraud charges against Theranos, its CEO Holmes and former president Ramesh "Sunny" Balwani, claiming they had engaged in an "elaborate, years-long fraud" wherein they "deceived investors into believing that its key product – a portable blood analyzer – could conduct comprehensive blood tests from finger drops of blood". Holmes reached a settlement with the SEC which required her to pay $500,000, forfeit 19 million shares of company stock, and be barred from having a leadership position in any public company for ten years. Balwani did not settle with the SEC.

On June 15, 2018, Holmes and Balwani were indicted on multiple counts of wire fraud and conspiracy to commit wire fraud. According to the indictment, investors, doctors, and patients were defrauded. It is alleged that the defendants were aware of the unreliability and inaccuracy of their products, but concealed that information. The case, United States v. Elizabeth A. Holmes, et al., was assigned to Lucy H. Koh, United States district judge of the United States District Court for the Northern District of California. The jury selection for the trial was to begin on July 28, 2020, and the trial was to have commenced in August 2020; however, the COVID-19 pandemic led to a proposed October date, before the trial for Holmes was rescheduled to begin on August 31, 2021, with Balwani's trial pushed back further to 2022.

In February 2021, federal prosecutors accused Holmes and other executives of destroying evidence in Theranos's final days in business. The specific evidence in question is the history of internal testing, including accuracy and failure rates of Theranos's blood-testing systems. On January 3, 2022, Holmes was found guilty of four counts of wire fraud and one count of conspiracy to commit wire fraud. She was sentenced in November 2022 to 11 years and 3 months in prison. On May 30, 2023, Holmes began serving her sentence at Federal Prison Camp, Bryan in Bryan, Texas. Balwani's trial began in March 2022 and he was convicted of 12 counts of fraud in July 2022. In December he was sentenced to 12 years and 11 months in prison and three years of probation.

== Technology and products ==
Theranos claimed to have developed devices to automate and miniaturize blood tests using microscopic blood volumes. Theranos dubbed its blood collection vessel the "nanotainer" and its analysis machine the "Edison". Holmes reportedly named the device "Edison" after inventor Thomas Edison, stating, "We tried everything else and it failed, so let's call it the Edison." Refinery29 posited that this was because of a well-known Edison quote: "I've not failed. I've just found 10,000 ways that won't work." The blood sample was to be collected via a finger prick and then transferred to the nanotainer through Theranos's sample collection device. At just 12.9 millimetres (0.51 in) in height, the nanotainer held a couple of drops of blood.

One of the patents for the Edison described a point of care system that could communicate with the Internet to receive instructions for which blood tests to run on the samples, before communicating these results back through the Internet. The results would then be compared to medical data available on the Internet, with the Edison running supplementary blood tests that were more targeted based on the results of the comparison. The patent was unclear on how much blood the Edison would actually require to conduct these blood tests. In one section, the patent claimed the sample needed to consist of about 10 drops of blood, but in another section, it claimed the Edison would need less than one drop of blood. The technology was criticized for not being peer reviewed. Theranos claimed to have data verifying the accuracy and reliability of its tests that would be published. In February 2016, Theranos announced that it would permit the Cleveland Clinic to complete a validation study of its technology.

David Agus, an oncologist who is a professor of medicine and chief executive of the Ellison Medical Institute has said "The problem with blood is it clots and, when you do these small fluidics, it clogs. She wouldn't give me an answer of why that wasn't a problem for her. To me, that was the initial red flag. The emperor with no clothes was evident in that she was either ultra-secretive, or the way she was trying to explain things didn't make sense." In March 2016, a study authored by 13 scientists appeared in the Journal of Clinical Investigation, where it was stated that the company's blood test results were flagged "outside their normal range 1.6× more often than other testing services", that 68 percent of lab measurements evaluated "showed significant interservice variability", and that "lipid panel test results between Theranos and other clinical services" were "nonequivalent". In August 2016, the company introduced a new robotic capillary blood testing unit named "miniLab" at the 2016 annual meeting of the American Association for Clinical Chemistry, but did not present any data supporting the claimed abilities of the device. The miniLab was allegedly capable of carrying out a range of tests from a small amount of blood. After Theranos failed to address concerns that it exaggerated the capabilities of the miniLab, Walgreens withdrew from their partnership. It was found that Theranos relied on commercial diagnostic analyzers, it had to dilute small blood samples using unvalidated dilution protocols to meet minimum volume requirements, a practice that introduced significant inaccuracies. It was later required that Theranos issue hundreds of thousands of corrected reports, voiding two years of test results showing inaccuracies with the Edison technology.

== Corporate affairs ==
=== Location ===
The company moved from 3200 Hillview Ave to the former headquarters of Facebook at 1601 S. California Ave in June 2012. By 2017 Theranos was headquartered at 1701 Page Mill Road, Palo Alto, California, paying a $1 million per month lease for the Stanford Research Park building. It had laboratories in Newark, California, and Scottsdale, Arizona. In 2017, when Theranos was still denying its publicly reported fraud, the company vacated its Page Mill headquarters, moving remaining staff into the Newark, California, laboratories; Stanford University School of Medicine converted the Page Mill building to offices and medical laboratories.

=== Management ===
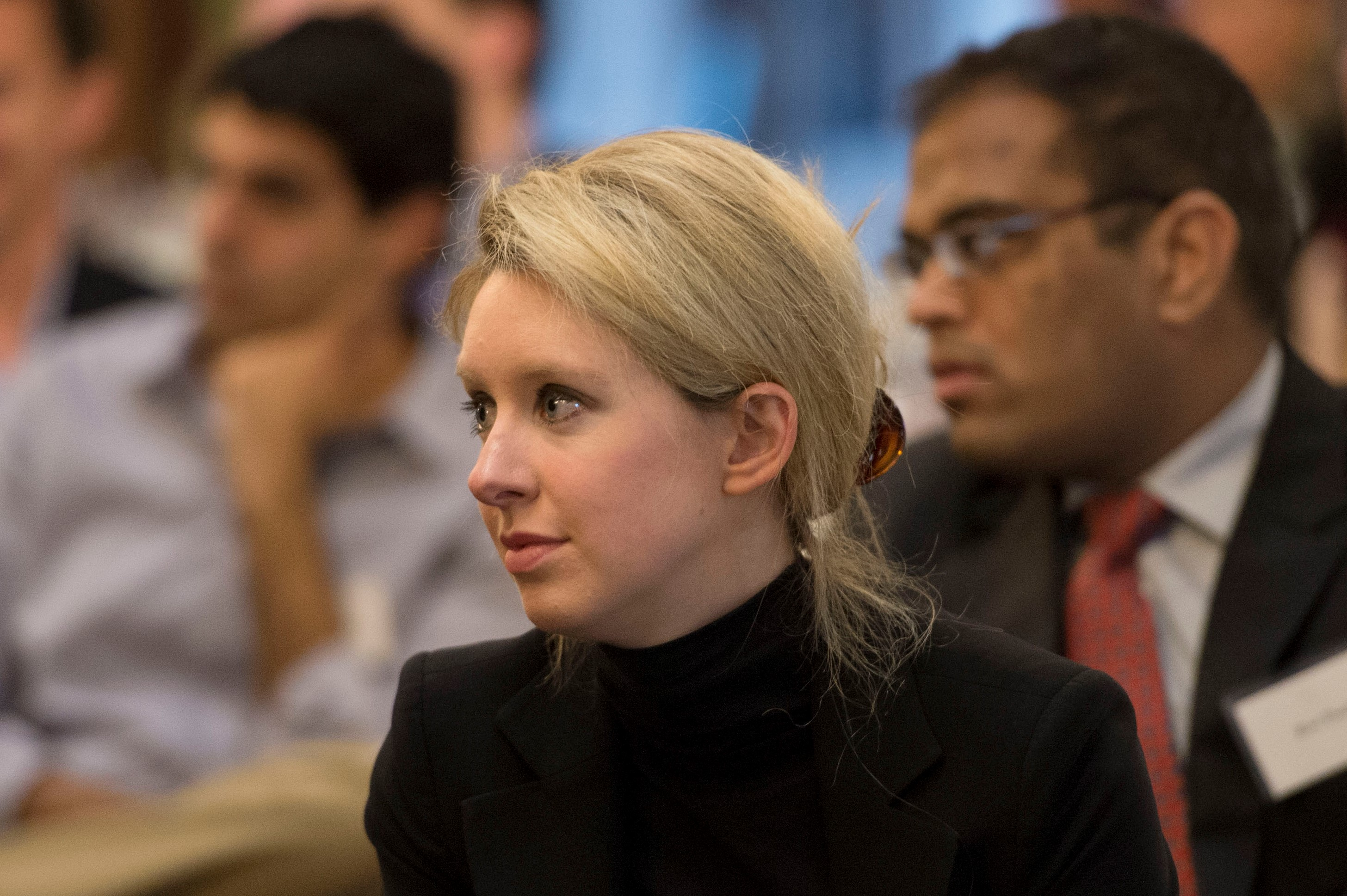
Holmes, the chief executive officer and founder of Theranos (2013)

From its incorporation in 2003 until 2018, Holmes was the company's chief executive officer. She recruited Channing Robertson, a chemical-engineering professor at Stanford, to be a technical advisor and the company's first board member during its early years. Holmes's then-boyfriend Sunny Balwani, a software engineer whom Holmes had met during high school, joined the company as its president and chief operating officer in 2009. In July 2011, Holmes was introduced to former U.S. Secretary of State George Shultz, who joined the Theranos board of directors that month. Over the next three years, Shultz helped to introduce almost all the outside directors on the "all-star board", which included William Perry (former U.S. Secretary of Defense), Henry Kissinger (former U.S. Secretary of State), Sam Nunn (former U.S. Senator), Bill Frist (former U.S. Senator, senate majority leader and heart-transplant surgeon), Gary Roughead (Admiral, USN, retired), Jim Mattis (General, USMC), Richard Kovacevich (former Wells Fargo Chairman and CEO) and Riley P. Bechtel (chairman of the board and former CEO at Bechtel Group). The board was criticized for consisting "mainly of directors with diplomatic or military backgrounds".

In April 2016, Theranos announced its medical advisory board, which included past presidents or board members of the American Association for Clinical Chemistry. Members were invited to review the company's proprietary technologies and advise on the integration into clinical practice. The board included members with relevant biomedical expertise such as past president of the American Association for Clinical Chemistry Susan A. Evans; William Foege, former director of the U.S. Centers for Disease Control and Prevention (CDC); David Helfet, director of the Orthopedic Trauma Service at the Hospital for Special Surgery; and professors Ann M. Gronowski, Larry J. Kricka, Jack Ladenson, Andy O. Miller and Steven Spitalnik.

Balwani left his position as president and COO in May 2016. At that time, the company announced its new board members, Fabrizio Bonanni (former executive vice president of Amgen), Richard Kovacevich and William Foege, who would help to publicly introduce its technologies. In May 2016, members of the Theranos board of directors were:

- Elizabeth Holmes, founder and CEO
- Riley Bechtel, former Bechtel Group CEO
- David Boies, a founder and the chairman of Boies Schiller Flexner
- William Foege, former director of the CDC
- Richard Kovacevich, former CEO and chairman of Wells Fargo
- Jim Mattis, later U.S. Secretary of Defense
- Fabrizio Bonanni, former executive vice president of Amgen

It was announced in November 2016 that the celebrity-studded "board of counselors" would be scrapped in January 2017. In December 2016, Theranos announced that its management team would be restructured with the departure of Riley Bechtel. In January 2017, incoming U.S. Secretary of Defense nominee James Mattis resigned from the Theranos board. In December 2016, the Theranos board of directors included:

- Elizabeth Holmes
- William Foege
- Fabrizio Bonanni
- Daniel Warmenhoven, former NetApp CEO, replacing Bechtel

=== Board member controversy ===
Avie Tevanian left Apple on March 31, 2006, and joined the boards of both Dolby Labs and Theranos, Inc. He resigned from the board of Theranos in late 2007, with an acrimonious ending as he faced legal threats and was forced to waive his right to buy a company co-founder's shares, actions he believed were in retaliation for the skepticism he was often alone in expressing about the company's finances and progress in developing its technology at board meetings.

In 2019, Tevanian gave a wide-ranging interview on his time at Theranos for a six-part podcast series called The Dropout, produced by ABC News. In the interview, he said: "I had seen so many things that were bad go on. I would never expect anyone would behave the way that she [Elizabeth Holmes] behaved as a CEO. And believe me, I worked for Steve Jobs. I saw some crazy things. But Elizabeth took it to a new level.”

=== Valuation ===
Theranos raised millions of dollars in its first years. In 2004, Theranos was based in a rented basement near the Stanford campus. By December 2004, the company had raised more than $6 million from investors at a valuation of $30 million. The company had about $45 million total fundraising after Series B and Series C funding in 2006. Theranos raised an additional $45 million in 2010 at a valuation of $1 billion. The company had significant news coverage starting in September 2013 after profiles in the San Francisco Business Times and The Wall Street Journal. By 2014, Theranos had raised more than $400 million with an estimated value of $9 billion. Theranos raised more than $700 million from venture capitalists and private investors, resulting in a $10 billion valuation at its peak in 2013 and 2014. In 2016, Forbes revised the estimated net worth of the company to $800 million taking into account the $724 million of capital raised. Between 2004 and 2016, the amount of available cash from investors for private equity/venture capital firms to invest in companies grew from $400 billion to $1.5 trillion. It was a period of plentiful capital available where investors were pressured to find investment targets to deploy capital on. In the Theranos case, insufficient due diligence and fraudulent business practices led to the losses for investors.

In May 2017, participating shareholders provided a release of any potential claims against Theranos in exchange for shares of the company's new preferred stock. Holders of more than 99% of the shares elected to participate. Holmes contributed shares to the company and gave up equity to offset potential dilution to non-participating shareholders. In May 2018, John Carreyrou reported that American business and government leaders lost more than $600 million by privately investing in Theranos. Major investments had been made by the Walton family ($150 million), Rupert Murdoch ($121 million), Betsy DeVos ($100 million), the Cox family (of Cox Media Group) ($100 million) and Larry Ellison. The final liquidation of the company in September 2018 rendered these investments worthless.

== Books, documentaries, and miniseries ==
John Carreyrou, a Wall Street Journal journalist whose work exposed Theranos, published a book-length treatment in May 2018 titled Bad Blood: Secrets and Lies in a Silicon Valley Startup. A film version was reportedly scheduled for release in 2020, starring Jennifer Lawrence as Holmes, written by Vanessa Taylor and directed by Adam McKay. In January 2022, McKay stated that preparations for the film had resumed, and that Lawrence was working on learning Holmes's speech pattern. However, in November 2022, Lawrence announced she would no longer be involved with the project.

In January 2019, ABC News Nightline released a podcast and documentary about the Holmes/Theranos story called The Dropout.

A docudrama miniseries with the same name, based on the eponymous podcast, premiered on Hulu in the US, Star+ in Latin America and Disney+ internationally in March 2022, with Amanda Seyfried as Holmes.

Also in January 2019, a documentary film entitled The Inventor: Out for Blood in Silicon Valley about Holmes and Theranos was released. Directed by Alex Gibney, it made its debut at the Sundance Film Festival and was released March 2019 on HBO platforms.

On October 16, 2026, filmmaker Nathan Fielder and co-director Lance Oppenheim's documentary You Can See Everything was released. Elizabeth Holmes and partner Billy Evans invited Fielder and Oppenheim to spend time with them and their children, and filming started 34 days before Holmes would report to prison in May 2023. The film crew continued to follow and interact with the family over the next 3 years.

== See also ==
- Ian Gibbons – Theranos's chief scientist who died by suicide in 2013
- Richard Fuisz – defendant in a patent related lawsuit filed by Theranos and its CEO
- Haemanthus (company)
