= John Carreyrou =

American journalist and author

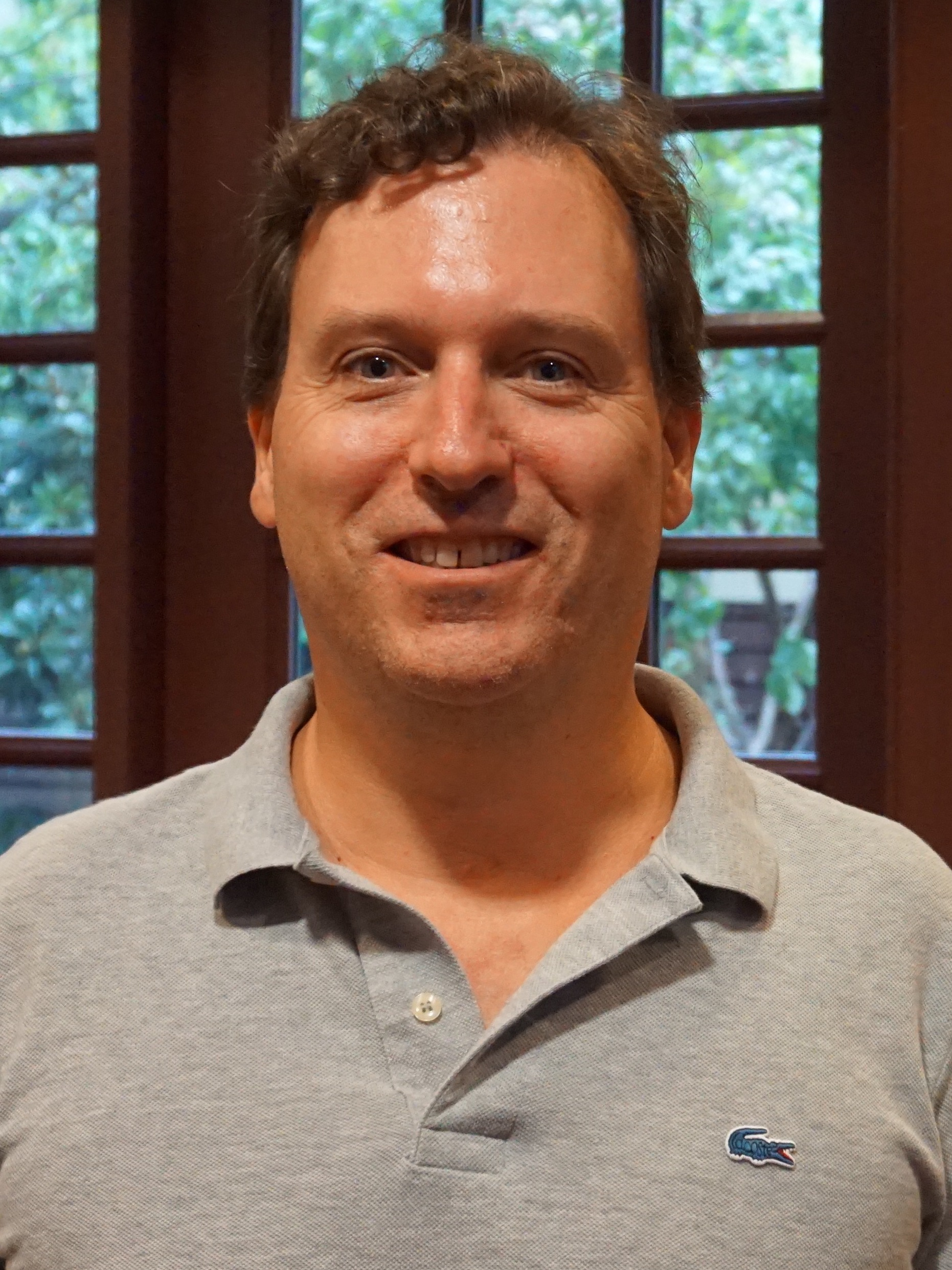
- Carreyrou in 2019
- Born: New York City, New York, U.S.
- Citizenship: French; American
- Education: Duke University (BA)
- Notable work: Bad Blood: Secrets and Lies in a Silicon Valley Startup (2018)
- Spouse: Molly Schuetz
- Children: 3
- Awards: Pulitzer Prize for Explanatory Reporting (2003); Gerald Loeb Award for Investigative (2015); Pulitzer Prize for Investigative Reporting (2015); George Polk Award for Financial Reporting (2016)

John Carreyrou (/ˌkæriˈruː/) is an American investigative reporter at The New York Times. Carreyrou worked for The Wall Street Journal for 20 years between 1999 and 2019 and has been based in Brussels, Paris, and New York City. He won the Pulitzer Prize twice and helped expose the fraudulent practices of the multibillion-dollar blood-testing company Theranos in a series of articles published in The Wall Street Journal.

== Early life and career ==
John Carreyrou was born to French journalist Gérard Carreyrou and an American mother. He grew up in Paris. Carreyrou graduated from Duke University in 1994 with a B.A. in political science and government.

After graduation, he joined the Dow Jones Newswires. In 1999, he joined The Wall Street Journal Europe in Brussels. In 2001, he moved to Paris to cover French business and other topics such as terrorism. In 2003, he was appointed the deputy bureau chief for Southern Europe. He covered French politics and business, Spain, and Portugal. By 2008, he was the deputy bureau chief and later bureau chief of the health and science bureau in New York.

In late 2015, spurred by a deep investigation carried out by Eleftherios Diamandis and a tip by pathologist Adam Clapper, Carreyrou began a series of investigative articles on Theranos, the blood-testing start-up founded by Elizabeth Holmes, that questioned the firm's claim to be able to run a wide range of lab tests from a tiny sample of blood from a finger prick. Holmes turned to Rupert Murdoch, whose media empire included Carreyrou's employer at the time, The Wall Street Journal, to kill the story. Murdoch, who became the biggest investor in Theranos in 2015 as a result of his $125 million injection, refused the request from Holmes saying that "he trusted the paper's editors to handle the matter fairly". In May 2018, Knopf published Carreyrou's book-length treatment of the topic, Bad Blood: Secrets and Lies in a Silicon Valley Startup. Carreyrou also features prominently in a documentary about Theranos called The Inventor: Out for Blood in Silicon Valley.

In August 2019, Carreyrou left the Wall Street Journal, opting for paid speaking engagements that are banned by the newspaper. For future plans, he commented "I want to keep writing non-fiction books for the second part of my career".

In 2021, Carreyrou released a podcast called "Bad Blood: The Final Chapter" covering the trial of Elizabeth Holmes.

In March 2022, Hulu released The Dropout, a miniseries about Elizabeth Holmes and the Theranos scandal, where Carreyrou is portrayed by Ebon Moss-Bachrach.

In early 2023 Carreyrou joined The New York Times as an investigative reporter.

In December 2025, Carreyrou, with five other authors, sued various companies offering large language models (LLMs) over unauthorized use of copyrighted work to train their models. Defendants included OpenAI, Anthropic, Meta Platforms, xAI, Perplexity, and Google.

In 2026, Carreyrou claims to have identified Adam Back as the creator of Bitcoin, pseudonymously known as Satoshi Nakamoto.

== Awards ==
In 2003, Carreyrou shared the Pulitzer Prize for Explanatory Reporting with a team of Wall Street Journal reporters for a series of stories that exposed corporate scandals in America. Carreyrou co-authored the article Damage Control: How Messier Kept Cash Crisis at Vivendi Hidden for Months, published Oct. 31, 2002.

In 2003, Carreyrou won the German Marshall Fund's Peter R. Weitz Junior Prize for excellence in reporting on European affairs for his detailed coverage of the downfall of Vivendi Universal SA and its chairman, Jean-Marie Messier.

In 2004, Carreyrou shared the German Marshall Fund's Peter R. Weitz Senior Prize for excellence in reporting on European affairs with a team of six Wall Street Journal journalists. In the five-part series titled The Disintegration of the Trans-Atlantic Relationship over the Iraq War Carreyrou contributed the article In Normandy, U.S.–France Feud Cuts Deep. Published on February 24, 2003, while Carreyrou was based in Paris, the article explored how France's Normandy region, site of the D-Day landings, was caught between gratitude for the U.S. role in World War II and France's opposition to war in Iraq.

In 2015, Carreyrou shared the Pulitzer Prize for Investigative Reporting and the Gerald Loeb Award for Investigative with a team of investigative reporters at The Wall Street Journal for "Medicare Unmasked", a project that forced the American government in 2014 to release important Medicare data kept secret for decades, and in a sweeping investigative series uncovered abuses that cost billions. Carreyrou co-authored four articles in the series: Taxpayers face big tab for unusual doctor billings, A fast-growing medical lab tests anti-kickback law, Doctor 'self-referral' thrives on legal loophole and Sprawling medicare struggles to fight fraud.

In 2016, Carreyrou received the 67th annual George Polk Awards in Journalism for Financial Reporting in 2015, and the Gerald Loeb Award for Beat Reporting. His investigation of Theranos, Inc. "raised serious doubts about claims by the firm and its celebrated 31-year-old founder, Elizabeth Holmes". According to Vanity Fair, "a damning report published in The Wall Street Journal had alleged that the company was, in effect, a sham". A book-length treatment titled Bad Blood: Secrets and Lies in a Silicon Valley Startup (2018) won the Financial Times and McKinsey Business Book of the Year Award. A film version was once described as being in the works starring Jennifer Lawrence, written by Vanessa Taylor, and directed by Adam McKay. Lawrence has since stated that she will no longer be participating in the new film after seeing the strength of Amanda Seyfried's performance as Elizabeth Holmes in the Hulu limited series The Dropout.

== Personal life ==
Carreyrou lives in Brooklyn, New York, with his wife Molly Schuetz, an editor at Bloomberg News, and their three children.
