= Federal Prison Camp, Bryan =

Federal prison in Texas, United States

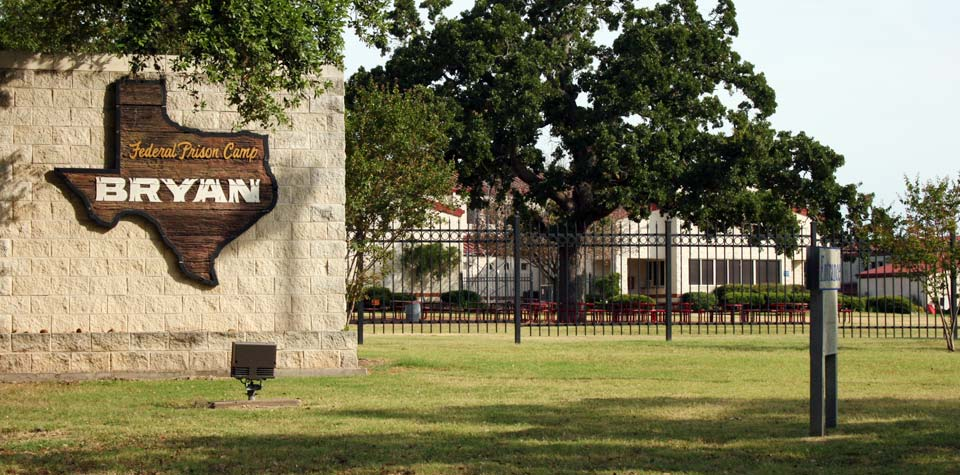
- Interactive map of Federal Prison Camp, Bryan
- Location: Bryan, Texas; 30.6779°N 96.3609°W
- Status: Operational
- Security class: Minimum-security
- Capacity: 720
- Population: 639
- Opened: 1989
- Managed by: Federal Bureau of Prisons
- Warden: Tanisha Hall

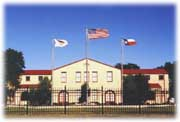
Front of the camp

Federal Prison Camp, Bryan (FPC Bryan) is a minimum-security United States federal prison for female inmates in Bryan, Texas. It is operated by the Federal Bureau of Prisons, a division of the United States Department of Justice. Opened in July 1989, the prison is located in a 37-acre (15-hectare) compound. It is designed to hold short-term offenders with average sentences of five years or less.

FPC Bryan is located 95 miles (153 km) northwest of Houston. FPC Bryan along with FPC Lewisburg and FPC Lompoc have the lowest security rating of all the federal institutions, other than community corrections centers as those are known as halfway houses. Due to the low classification, most of these facilities have no fence and a low staff-to-inmate ratio.

== Ghislaine Maxwell controversy ==
In August 2025, Ghislaine Maxwell was transferred to FPC Bryan from FCI Tallahassee, following a meeting with Todd Blanche. This was a controversial move, as normally sex offenders are not housed in minimum security prisons. A statement was released by the family of Virginia Giuffre and Annie and Maria Farmer, expressing that they feel that Maxwell had received preferential treatment in the transfer. However, Ian Maxwell, her brother, claimed that the move was needed, as FCI Tallahassee was violent and she had many threats. Residents in Bryan also disliked the move, because of increased security requirements and unwanted attention on the town, with one saying "It's creepy because a lot of people try to catch her." In leaked emails, Maxwell claimed that Bryan is a much better place, and that she is safer. In response, David Oscar Markus, who is Maxwell's lawyer, claimed that the leaking of the emails was "tabloid behavior".

There have also been claims that Maxwell has been receiving special treatment. On November 9, 2025, Jamie Raskin wrote a letter to Donald Trump. Raskin claimed that Maxwell had been receiving special meals, ability to interact with a puppy, and alternative phone access when phone lines were down. Whistleblower Noella Turnage, who was a nurse at the prison, was fired. Canine Companions, the company that runs the dog training program for the prison, stated on August 7, 2025, that Maxwell would not be allowed to train a puppy, as she is there on sex offender charges. Former Real Housewives star Jen Shah, who was there in the same prison with Maxwell made similar claims, such as saying she got custom meals. In response, the Bureau of Prisons gave a statement saying allegations of preferential treatment would be taken seriously. Shah was also contacted by Robert Garcia for more information.

On June 16, officials from the House Oversight Committee visited Maxwell's prison. Robert Garcia alleged that Maxwell was receiving special treatment and stated that the warden told him that Maxwell was the only sex offender in the prison. David Oscar Markus, lawyer for Maxwell stated that he opposed the prison tour and said that "Humane treatment isn't special treatment, and political prison tours don't move the country forward". The Bureau of Prisons also released a statement saying that Maxwell was transferred for reasons concerning her own safety and that they answered questions from congressional staff.

== Notable inmates ==
Inmate Name	Register Number	Status	Details
Ruby Jane McMillan	17577-035	Arrived in 2016, served 38 months. Released August 2017.	Part of a methamphetamine distribution ring broken up in 2014; pleaded guilty to conspiracy in 2015.
Lea Fastow	20290-179	Released from custody in 2005; served 11 months.	Former Enron Assistant Treasurer and wife of former Enron CFO Andrew Fastow; pleaded guilty in 2004 to tax fraud for failing to report over $200,000 in illegal income from the company.
Jenna Ryan	25912-509	Served a 60-day sentence that began on November 4, 2021.	Participated in the 2021 Capitol Attack.
Sylvia Handy	59164-279	Released from custody in 2012; served 2 years.	Former Commissioner in Hidalgo County, Texas; pleaded guilty in 2010 to hiring illegal immigrants as county employees, using them as caretakers at her home, and stealing their earnings to pay for personal expenses.
Michelle Janavs	77816-112	Served a 5-month sentence; released November 16, 2020.	Charged with connection to the 2019 college admissions bribery scandal.
Jen Shah	37357-509	Arrived in February 2023, serving a 6.5 year sentence. Released early on December 10, 2025, after 2.5 years.	Pleaded guilty to conspiracy to commit wire fraud between 2012 and 2021.
Elizabeth Holmes	24965-111	Serving an 11-year prison sentence. Scheduled for release November 19, 2032. — or, as of September 16, 2026, perhaps as early as February 22, 2030.	Convicted of wire fraud and conspiracy to commit wire fraud.
Icy Blu (born Laurel Yurchick)	87525-380	Serving a 10.1 year prison sentence. Scheduled for release December 7, 2029.	Convicted of conspiracy to possess with intent to distribute 50g or more of methamphetamine.
Ghislaine Maxwell	02879-509	Sentenced to 20 years in prison, with a scheduled release date of July 17, 2037.	Associate of Jeffrey Epstein, convicted of: Sex trafficking of a minor; Transporting a minor with the intent to engage in criminal sexual activity; Conspiracy (3 counts)
Deadra Johnson	95105-510	Serving a 3-year prison sentence. Scheduled for release May 11, 2028.	Former executive director of Killeen Housing Authority in Killeen, Texas. Plead guilty to the Theft of Government Property for stealing over $300,000 in HUD funds intended for low-income housing

== See also ==
- List of U.S. federal prisons
- Incarceration in the United States
