= Fingerstick =

Capillary blood test

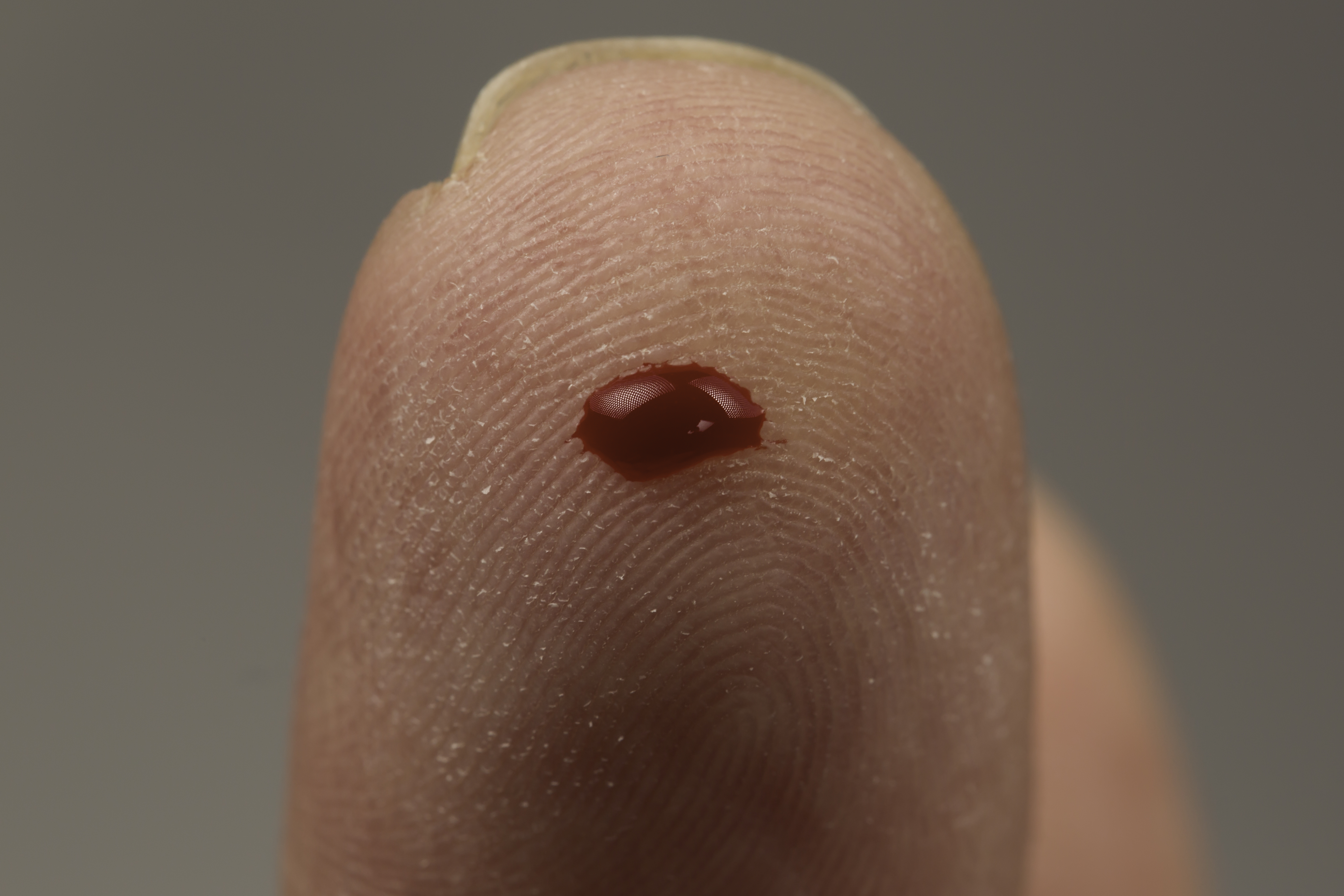
A droplet of blood is taken from the fingertip

A fingerstick blood test being taken

In medicine, some blood tests are conducted on capillary blood obtained by fingerstick (or fingerprick). The site, free of surface arterial flow, where the blood is to be collected is sterilized with a topical germicide, and the skin pierced with a sterile lancet. After a droplet has formed, capillary blood is captured in a capillary tube (usually relying on surface tension) or on a membrane.

In very young children, blood may be taken by an analogous neonatal heel prick on the heel of the foot.

== Advantages ==
Capillary blood is easy to obtain especially for people with bad veins and infants. This method requires lower blood volumes which reduces the chance of anemia, it can be done from home and requires no training. It is less invasive and cheaper than traditional venous blood sampling. This method could improve the lives of patients who need regular check ups, have flaring diseases, or live remotely and have less access to doctors or phlebotomists.

== Disadvantages ==
Capillary blood is more prone to inconsistencies due to the lower blood volume, or differences in drawing capillary blood. Blood cells drawn from fingersticks have a tendency to undergo hemolysis, especially if the finger is "milked" to obtain more blood. When the finger is "milked", the blood dilutes and the quantities of metabolites or biomarkers will be incorrect. Further, regularly pricking the finger could cause scarring and occasionally leads to calcified nodules in infants.

== Uses ==
Tests commonly conducted on the capillary blood collected are:

- Blood gas test – Fingerstick testing may be used for measuring blood gas tension values, blood pH, and the level and base excess of bicarbonate.
- Glucose levels – Diabetics often have a portable blood meter to check on their blood sugar.
- Lipid profile – Fingerstick testing may be used to find abnormalities in blood lipid (such as cholesterol and triglycerides) concentrations.
- Mononucleosis – Fingerstick testing can be used to test for mononucleosis.
- Hemoglobin levels – Fingerstick testing of hemoglobin is a quick screening procedure to ensure a blood or plasma donor has an acceptably high blood count for donating blood or blood components.
- Genetic testing – Heelprick testing of a newborn's DNA allows for early diagnosis and mitigation of common hereditary disorders.
- Complete blood count
- Prothrombin time
- Dried blood spot and dried plasma spot - A method where dried capillary blood is used to detect metabolites or biomarkers in blood or plasma.

Fingersticks are routine for adults, but are generally performed on children and the elderly only if a small amount of blood suffices for needed tests. Neonates are given heelpricks instead, as this is less likely to cause permanent damage.
