= List of swimming pools =

This is a list of notable swimming pools, especially full long course 50 by 25 metres (164 ft × 82 ft) ones suited for Olympic competitions (with 10 lanes, just 8 used, and 2m or more deep). This also includes current and past pools with historical or architectural importance. It is not intended to include hot springs pools except where actual swimming, as opposed to bathing or wading, is possible.

Organized swimming as a competitive sport seems to have emerged in England in the 1830s, after the first indoor swimming pool of some type, at St. George's Baths, was opened in 1828. Swimming was included in the first Olympics of modern times, in Athens in 1896, with competition held in the Bay of Zea at Piraeus, about 10 kilometres (6.2 mi) from the stadium where many events were held. In the 1900 Summer Olympics in Paris, swimming was in the Seine. The 1904 Summer Olympics, the only Olympic games where the yard was the measure for setting racing distances, was held at a lake in Forest Park, in St. Louis, Missouri. The first Olympic swimming pool was used in the 1908 Summer Olympics, in London, outdoors in the infield of White City Stadium (demolished in 1985).

In modern times, an Olympic pool may be used for a competition, and then moved to be used elsewhere. This what happened with pools at the Olympic Aquatics Stadium and the Maria Lenk Aquatic Center of the 2016 Summer Olympics: these were transformed into four 50 meter pools in Manaus (4000 km west of Rio), Salvador de Bahia (1600 km north), Guarantiguetà (250 km west) and Fortaleza de São João (20 km away within Rio). And for the 2028 Summer Olympics, a baseball stadium in Los Angeles will be modified into a temporary aquatics venue to host the swimming, synchronized swimming and diving events.

World Aquatics (Previously FINA) sets standards for swimming pools used in international competitions. Its requirements are not met by many "Olympic-sized" pools; for example of the 15 or more Olympic-sized pools in the Philippines, only the one at New Clark City Aquatics Center is FINA-certified. FINA's requirement that a pool must be 2 meters deep (with 3 meters recommended) is met by some pools elsewhere being adjustable in depth at their shallow ends, such for the competition pool in Tromsø, Norway.

Specialization of Kenya, other East African countries in track, of Cuba in boxing, has been attributed by some to their lack of investment in pools and other athletic facilities. There have been numerous calls within countries for Olympic level facilities, e.g. Kenya below, even in developed nations such as Canada, where the capital region around Ottawa is deemed to be under-served. Just as it is hard for a tropical nation to develop what's needed to be competitive in bobsled, so is it difficult for many nations to afford the upfront and high continuing costs of Olympic pools, given other needs.

In recent years, there has been possibility for some third world countries to obtain needed investment through China's Belt and Road program. "Chinese construction companies also helped the Government of Kenya build a US$52 million sports stadium with a seating capacity of 60,000 people, an Olympic-size swimming pool, and a modern gymnasium to host the fourth All-Africa games ..." Plan for initiative to build an Olympic stadium in Kuwait.

Swimming pools, worldwide, are numerous. For the facilities that have actually been used in an Olympics, see List of Olympic venues in swimming. For very large ones, see List of largest swimming pools.

Facilities by nation include:

== Algeria ==
Piscine du Complexe Olympique, Algiers, used in 2007 All-Africa Games. The 1978 All-Africa Games were also held in Algiers.

== Argentina ==
- Club Universitario de Buenos Aires, Buenos Aires, hosted swimming events of 1951 Pan American Games

== Australia ==
- Swimming and Diving Stadium (1956), now the Melbourne Sports and Entertainment Centre in what is known as Melbourne Sports and Entertainment Precinct in Melbourne, the aquatic centre for the 1956 Olympic Games. Its Olympic-sized pool was replaced with a parquetry floor in 1983 for use in basketball and concert events.
- Sydney Olympic Park Aquatic Centre, Sydney Olympic Park in Sydney, built in 1994, it hosted swimming and diving events of the 2000 Summer Olympics
- Brisbane Aquatic Center, in Sleeman Centre, Brisbane, was built for the 1982 Commonwealth Games. It has a 50 m indoor Olympic pool (2m depth), a 50 m outdoor Olympic pool (4m to 2m in depth), a 25 m lap pool, and a 25-metre diving pool with .5, 1, 3, 5, 7, and 10 m diving boards and platforms.
- North Sydney Olympic Pool (1936), North Sydney, designed in Inter-War Free Classical style with art deco-style decorations, hosted the swimming and diving events for the 1938 Empire Games. A 25 m indoor pool was added in 2001. Closed in 2021-22 for replacement of pool.
- Melbourne Sports and Aquatic Centre, 1997, has an outdoor 50m pool, an indoor 50m pool, and a 25m lap pool.
- Beatty Park Aquatic Centre, North Perth, Western Australia, built for the 1962 British Empire and Commonwealth Games
- Doone Kennedy Hobart Aquatic Centre was built to replace the Hobart Olympic Pool. It has a 50m Olympic pool (2m depth), and a 25-metre diving pool with 6 lanes and 5 m diving boards and platforms at lanes 5 and 3.

== Belgium ==
- Stade Nautique d'Antwerp, Antwerp, Belgium, built for the 1920 Summer Olympics, the first structure devoted to the aquatics events for the Summer Olympics
- Wezenberg Olympic Swimming Center, Antwerp, built in 1973 with a 50-meter pool and an 20 by 17 metres (66 ft × 56 ft) instruction pool. A second 50-meter pool, too narrow for competitions, was completed in 2015.
- Nemo 33, Brussels, 34.5 metres (113 ft) deep, the deepest indoor swimming pool from 2004 to 2014. In 2022, Nemo 33 is the fifth deepest swimming pool in the world

== Brazil ==
- Esporte Clube Pinheiros, São Paulo, hosted swimming events of the 1963 Pan American Games
- Fortaleza de São João in Rio de Janeiro was to get the main Olympic Stadium pool of the 2016 Summer Olympics. That pool is 50m x 25m x 3m in size."
- Manaus "The water polo pool (14x25x3 meters), which sat just outside of the permanent Maria Lenk Aquatic Center, was moved to Manaus and expanded into a 50 meter pool," "the water polo pool at the Maria Lenk Aquatics Centre will be turned into a 50m pool in the Amazonian city of Manaus." The Water Polo pool (14x25x3 meters), installed during the Games just outside the Maria Lenk Aquatic Centre was to be moved to Manaus, where it would become a 50-meter pool.
- Swimming Olympic Centre of Bahia, Salvador de Bahia, moved in April 2017 from the grounds of the 2016 Rio Olympics in Rio de Janeiro Swimming Olympic Centre of Bahia, also referred to as Aquatics Sports Centre of SUDESB. The facility will eventually include two pools – the main competition pool and" "This particular pool is one of two matching 50m x 25m x 2m deep pools from the Parque dos Atletas – the training ground for many Olympic athletes prior to competition. Its twin is destined for a military base in Guarantigueta, near São Paulo, and will be used for military training and competitions."

== Canada ==
50 m pools in Canada, from west to east, include:

British Columbia:

- Vancouver Aquatic Centre, West End, Vancouver, a City of Vancouver facility, has a 50 m pool, and has 1m and 3m diving boards and a diving tower with 5 m, 7.5 m, and 10 m height platforms.

Alberta:

- Kinsmen Aquatic Centre (1976) of Kinsmen Sports Centre, Edmonton, built to serve the 1978 Commonwealth Games

Manitoba:

- Pan Am Pool, Winnipeg indoor swimming facility built for the 1967 Pan American Games

Ontario: Toronto

- Aquatics Centre, Toronto Pan Am Sports Centre (2014), Toronto, Ontario, built for the 2015 Pan American Games has two Olympic sized swimming pools and a diving well
- Donald D. Summerville Olympic Pool, at Woodbine Beach, Toronto and East York, has an elevated 50 m Olympic size pool overlooking Lake Ontario, a 25 m training pool and a separate diving pool with 5 and 10 metre diving platforms. It was completed in 1963.
- Etobicoke Olympium in Etobicoke, has an 8 lane, 50 meter pool, and a 25-meter training pool. It also has diving towers attached to the competition. The building was built in 1975 and renovated in 2014 or 2015 for the 2015 Pan Am Games.
- Sunnyside Bathing Pavilion, outdoor pool along Lakeshore Boulevard West in Toronto
- Markham Pan Am Centre, has an Olympic size pool, and was opened in November 2015

Ontario: Ottawa

- Nepean Sportsplex (1971), Ottawa, owned by City of Ottawa, " has a 50 m Olympic pool with diving towers and springboards, and a 25 m family pool
- Montpetit Hall's pool (well before 1971), University of Ottawa, Ottawa, "lacks spectator space"
- Carleton University's pool (well before 1971), Ottawa only has six lanes

Ontario: Guelph

- Victoria Road Recreation Center, City of Guelph, has a 50 m pool and a 25 m swimming pool
- University of Guelph has a 25 m pool

Quebec: Montreal:

- Montreal Olympic Pool, in base of Montreal Tower, Montreal, built for the 1976 Summer Olympics

Nova Scotia: Halifax

- Dalplex, located at Dalhousie University, Halifax, built in 1979 has an 8-lane, 50-metre indoor swimming pool.

== Chile ==
- San Alfonso del Mar, Algarrobo, Chile, saltwater lagoon which is world's largest pool

== China ==
- Beijing National Aquatics Centre, Olympic Green in Beijing. Built for the 2008 Summer Olympics, it has a main pool, an Olympic "demonstration" pool, and a training pool, as well as a 12,000 square metres (130,000 sq ft) water park area (added in 2010).

== Congo ==
- Kintele Aquatic Complex, Brazzaville, Republic of the Congo, host to the swimming events of the 2015 African Games

== Croatia ==
- Sports Park Mladost, in Zagreb, on the embankment of the Sava River, has an Olympic-size swimming pool
- The Utrine sports center in Novi Zagreb has a newly opened indoor Olympic-size pool.
- Recreational swimmers can enjoy a smaller-size indoor swimming pool in Daničićeva Street, Zagreb

== Cuba ==
- Hotel Nacional de Cuba had a rectangular swimming pool that may have been Olympic-sized
- Copacabana sea water pool

== Dominican Republic ==
- Centro Olímpico Juan Pablo Duarte, in area of Félix Sánchez Olympic Stadium, Santo Domingo, hosted swimming events of 2003 Pan American Games.

== Egypt ==
- venue unknown, Cairo's hosting of the 1991 All-Africa Games

== Finland ==
- Helsinki Swimming Stadium, Helsinki, designed and partially built for the (cancelled) 1940 Olympic Games, completed in 1947, and later hosted the swimming events of the 1952 Summer Olympics.

== France ==
- Piscine des Tourelles, Paris, aquatics venue for the 1924 Summer Olympics.

== Germany ==
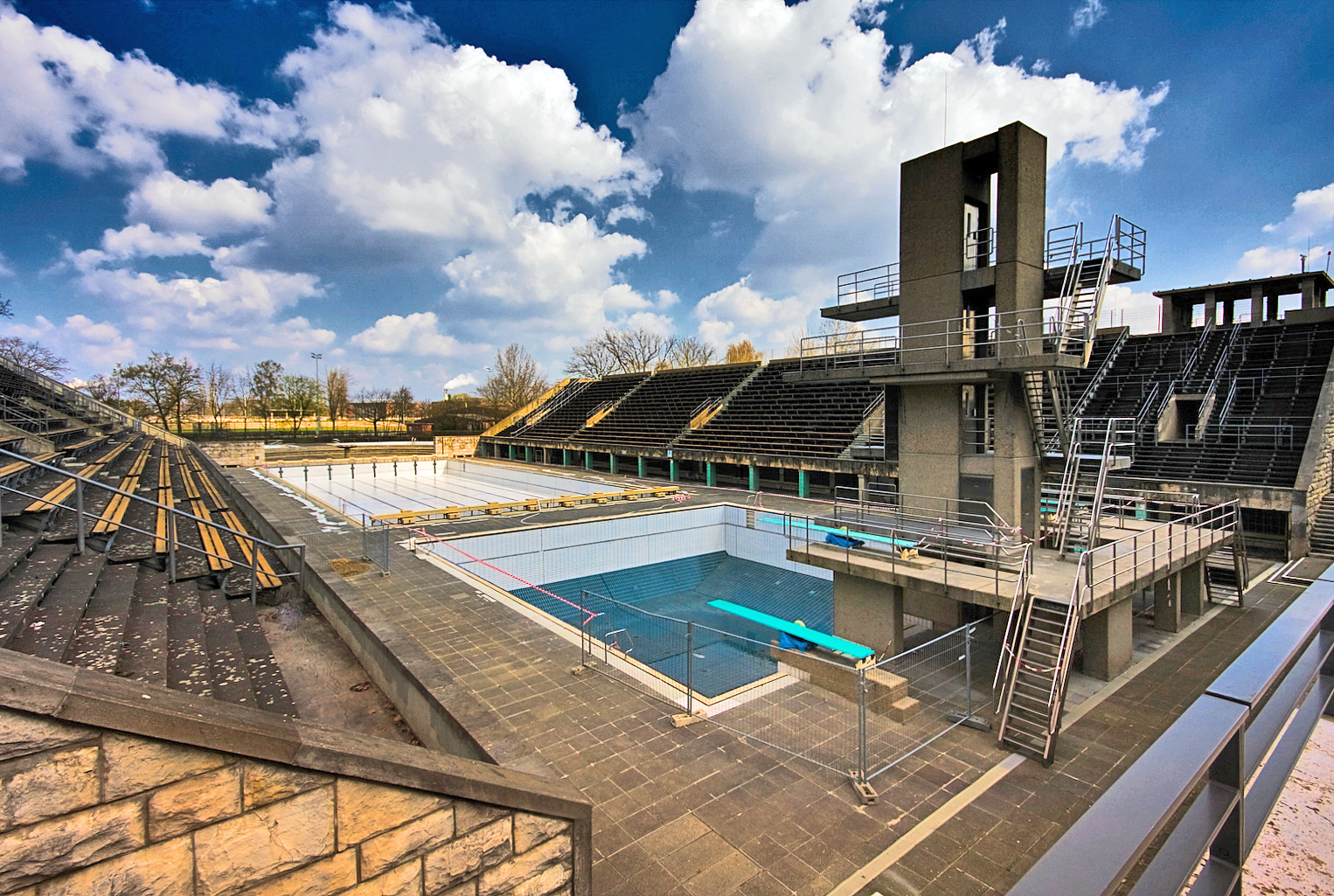
Olympic Swimming Stadium in Berlin

- Olympiapark Schwimmstadion Berlin, Reich Sportsfeld, Berlin, which hosted the 1936 Summer Olympics's swimming and diving competitions.
- Olympia Schwimmhalle, Olympiapark (Munich), Munich, which hosted swimming and diving of the 1972 Summer Olympics.
- Müller’sche Volksbad (c.1900), Munich, an Art Nouveau building with 30-meter pool (former men's pool) and 18-meter pool (former women's pool).

== Greece ==
- Olympic-sized pool of the Athens Olympic Aquatic Centre (c.1991, expanded c.2004), Athens Olympic Sports Complex, used in the 2004 Summer Olympics. There were complaints at the Olympics that the competition pool, outdoors, was too exposed to the hot sun; since then a roof has apparently enclosed the pool stadium.

== Hungary ==
- List of swimming pools in Hungary

== India ==
- Mahatma Gandhi Swimming Pool, Dadar West, Mumbai, has an Olympic-sized 50 by 25 metres (164 ft × 82 ft) outdoor pool with 10 lanes, and a 25 by 21 metres (82 ft × 69 ft) diving pool with 1m and 3m boards, 5m, 7.5m and 10m platforms.
- Kamla Nehru Park, Gurgaon was to get one, as of 2018
- Padukone Dravid Centre for Sports Excellence, Bangalore
- SPM Swimming Pool Complex (formerly known as Talkatora Swimming Pool), New Delhi
- Nerul Gymkhana, Nerul, Navi Mumbai has an olympic sized pool.

== Ireland ==
- List of long course swimming pools in the Republic of Ireland

== Italy ==
- Stadio Olimpico del Nuoto, Foro Italico in Rome, designed for the swimming and diving events of the 1960 Summer Olympics. Expanded to host the 1994 World Aquatics Championships.
- Y-40 The Deep Joy at Hotel Terme Millepini, Montegrotto Terme, Padua, Italy fourth deepest pool in the world.

== Japan ==
- Yoyogi National Gymnasium, Yoyogi Park in Shibuya, Tokyo, famous for its suspension roof design, completed in 1964 to host swimming and diving events of the 1964 Summer Olympics.
- Tokyo Aquatics Center Tokyo Aquatics Centre, Tokyo
- Tatsumi International Swimming Center, Tokyo Tatsumi International Swimming Center: "Housing two Olympic-sized pools and a diving pool, this futuristic-looking facility often hosts international swimming competitions."
- Tokyo Metropolitan Gymnasium, in Sendagaya, Tokyo? "has two pools, a 50m, eight-lane Olympic one and a 25-metre, six-lane pool"
- Meguro Citizens Center Gymnasium, in Meguro, Tokyo. Has a 25m indoor pool, and a 50m outdoor and kids' pool.

== Kenya ==
Note: 1985 call in the National Assembly for an Olympic pool, among other facilities, so we are not limited to track events.

== Malaysia ==
- National Aquatic Center, Bukit Jalil National Sports Complex, Kuala Lumpur, has an Olympic pool, an eight-lane training pool and a diving pool.
- Chin Woo Swimming Pool, Chin Loo Stadium, Kuala Lumpur
- Olympic pool, 50x25, 10 lanes, Penang
- Renaissance Kuala Lumpur Hotel & Convention Centre has an Olympic-size swimming pool

== Mexico ==
- Alberca Olímpica Francisco Márquez, Mexico City, which hosted swimming events of the 1968 Summer Olympics
- Scotiabank Aquatics Center, Zapopan, near Guadalajara, built for the 2011 Pan American Games. It is the most modern aquatic complex of its kind in Latin America.
- Estadio Olímpico Universitario, Ciudad Universitaria, Mexico City, hosted 1955 Pan American Games

== Monaco ==
- Rainier III Nautical Stadium, a salt water Olympic sized pool, constructed in 1961 out of a swimming area that was sectioned off from Monaco's harbor.

== Morocco ==
- Stade Mohammed V, Casablanca, Morocco includes Olympic pool, used in 2019 African Games

== Mozambique ==
- Zimpeto Olympic Pool, Maputo, used in 2011 All-Africa Games

== Netherlands ==
- Olympic Sports Park Swim Stadium, Amsterdam, aquatics venue for 1928 Summer Olympics, with pool 50 m long by 18 m wide, with 5 m deep diving area at one end. Demolished following the Olympics in 1929.
- Groenhovenbad, Gouda
- Pieter van den Hoogenband Zwemstadion, Eindhoven

== New Zealand ==
- The Olympic (1939), the nation's first and only 50 m pool for decades, used in 1950 Empire Games.
- Hawkes Bay Regional Aquatics Centre, under construction in 2021
- Christchurch Metro Sports Facility was to include a 50 m pool and a separate diving pool.

== Nigeria ==
- National Stadium, Lagos, Lagos, used in the 1973 African Games, closed in 1999.
- Moshood Abiola National Stadium, Abuja, its pool hosted swimming events of 2003 All-Africa Games

== North Korea ==
- Kim Il Sung University, Pyongyang, 8-lane Olympic size pool
- Multiple reports Olympic sized pool on 80 foot yacht of Kim Jong-un, including Deseret News, Business Insider,

== Norway ==
Norway has four "Olympic-sized" pools, including:

- Oasen, a public swimming pool built inside a rock cavern in Namsos
- Indoor 50-by-25-metre (164 ft × 82 ft) pool at Tøyenbadet, Tøyen, Oslo. In 2022, Tøyenbadet was being entirely rebuilt, to reopen in 2023.
- A 50-metre (160 ft) pool at Tromsøbadet, Tromsø, Norway's northernmost competition pool. The pool meets the requirements for national and international competitions. At the shallow end of the pool the depth can be adjusted from 0–2 metres (0.0–6.6 ft).

Other pools include:

- Two 50-metre (160 ft) pools, one with 8 lanes, at Frognerbadet (1956), Frogner, Oslo
- A 25-by-12.5-metre (82 ft × 41 ft) meter pool at Østfoldbadet, Askim

== Pakistan ==
- Islamabad venue, as Islamabad hosted 2004 South Asian Games
- Karachi, which had its first Olympic-size swimming, per Pakistan Digest
  - KMC Sports Complex? appears to be 8 lanes? youtube
  - Sports and Rehabilitation Centre, Aga Khan University appears to have 8 lanes Sports and Rehabilitation Centre | The Aga Khan University
  - Olympic size pool at Karachi Marriott Karachi Marriott Hotel - The Olympic size pool at Karachi Marriott | Facebook
  - Karachi: An Olympic-sized swimming pool existed in a Pakistan navy facility, PNS Dilawar. The swimming pool was filled with sea water, A Pursuit of Happiness: Memories, Dreams, and Mortality
- 2023 South Asian Games to be held in Lahore, first time out of Islamabad

== Peru ==
- Videna Aquatic Center, Lima, built for hosting the 2019 Pan American Games, Peru's first. It has two 50x25 m pools and a diving pool. Its pool was Peru's first new 50m pool built since 1962, and Lima's first.
- Pools complex of Estadio Mansiche, biggest stadium of the city of Trujillo, part of the greater Mansiche Sports Complex which includes the Mansiche Stadium, the Coliseo Gran Chimu, a swimming pool, and other facilities. Hosted 2018 South American Swimming Championships and 2013 Bolivarian Games.

== Philippines ==
There were 15 Olympic-sized (50 by 15 metres (164 ft × 49 ft)) pools and more being built, as of 2019, in the Philippines, and about 20 other 50-meter pools.

== Poland ==
- Termy Maltańskie Termy Maltanskie(the Olympic swimming pool complex) Poznań
- Deepspot, Mszczonów, Poland, the world's third? deepest swimming pool, 45 metres (148 ft), below Y-40 The Deep Joy pool in Italy, which is 131 feet
- Olympic swimming arena in Szczecin

== Russia ==
- Swimming Pool at the Olimpiysky Sports Complex, Moscow built for the 1980 Summer Olympics, includes a 50x25m swimming pool and a 35x25m diving pool.
- Olympic Pool, Moscow, Luzhniki Sports Complex Moscow. Opened in 1957, it was renovated in 1980 to host water polo events at the 1980 Summer Olympics. It has been demolished and may be reconstructed as a Multipurpose Aquatic Centre.

== South Africa ==
- Ellis Park Aquatic Centre, by Ellis Park Stadium, Johannesburg, Olympic pool used in 1999 All-Africa Games

== South Korea ==
- Jamsil Indoor Swimming Pool (1980), in Seoul Olympic Park, which hosted the 1988 Summer Olympics. It has an outdoor 50m x 25m, 10-lanes pool, an indoor 50m x 12.5m 5-lane pool, and an indoor 25m x 25m diving pool with 1m and 3m diving boards and 1m, 3m, 5m, 7.5m and 10m diving platforms.
- K-26, a pool with depth 26 metres (85 ft), the deepest swimming pool of its kind in Asia (vs. Taiwan's Divecube with depth 21 metres (69 ft)).

== Spain ==
- Piscines Bernat Picornell in the Olympic Ring in Montjuïc, Barcelona, with three swimming pools: a 50m indoor pool, a 50m outdoor pool, and a pool for diving. It hosted swimming events of the 1992 Summer Olympics.

== Taiwan ==
- Divecube, in Taichung, a 21 metres (69 ft) deep pool asserted to be deepest swimming pool of its kind in Asia, since submarined by K-26 in South Korea.

== Turkey ==
- Two 10-lane Olympic pools and a 5-lane 50-meter pool, Atatürk Swimming Complex, Adana, in facility opened in 1936 and re-constructed in 2009

== United Arab Emirates ==
- Deep Dive Dubai, United Arab Emirates, deepest swimming pool in the world

== United Kingdom ==
The UK has numerous Olympic-size pools itemized in List of long course swimming pools in the United Kingdom. Selected ones from that list, and other notable pools of the UK include:

=== England ===
- White City Stadium, London. Its outdoor pool, in the infield of the stadium, was the first swimming pool used in any Olympics, hosted swimming events of the 1908 Summer Olympics. It was demolished in 1985.
- London Aquatics Centre in Queen Elizabeth Olympic Park in Stratford, London. Used in the 2012 Summer Olympics, modified and opened to the public in 2014, it has is two 50-meter swimming pools and a 25-metre diving pool.
- Empire Pool, London, of complex now the Wembley Arena, built for the 1934 British Empire Games and last used for the 1948 Summer Olympics
- Manchester Aquatics Centre, Manchester, built for the 2002 Commonwealth Games
- Blue Abyss in Cornwall, second deepest swimming pool in the world
- UEA Sportspark in Norwich
- Basildon Sporting Village in Basildon

=== Scotland ===
- Tollcross International Swimming Centre, Glasgow, which hosted swimming events of the 2014 Commonwealth Games. It has an Olympic standard 50 m swimming pool and a second 50-metre pool for warm-ups and training
- Royal Commonwealth Pool, a category-A-listed building in St. Leonard's, Edinburgh. Built as part of seeking (and winning) 1970 British Commonwealth Games for Edinburgh. Hosted 1986 Commonwealth Games, 2014 Commonwealth Games and the inaugural 2018 European Championships The building's Modernist architecture is highly regarded: it was selected as one of 60 key Scottish monuments of the post-war period and nominated in 2002 by the Architecture Heritage Society of Scotland as one of the most significant modern contributions to Scottish heritage. S&P Architects, the architects and lead consultants for its 2012 refurbishment, were awarded the Scottish Design Award in 2012 for the best reuse of a listed building.

=== Wales ===
- Wales Empire Pool, Cardiff, was completed in 1958 for the 1958 British Empire and Commonwealth Games and was demolished in 1998. Its building was asserted to be the first modernist architecture in Cardiff. Its main pool measured 55 by 20 yards (50 m × 18 m); in 1970 it was shortened to 50 meters to meet international standards.

== United States ==
=== Arizona ===
- Mona Plummer Aquatic Center (1981), Arizona State University, Tempe. It includes an Olympic-size competition pool, another swimming pool, and a diving pool. Has been claimed to be "one of the best collegiate aquatic centers in the nation."

=== California ===
- LA84 Foundation/John C. Argue Swim Stadium, originally the "Los Angeles Swimming Stadium", near Los Angeles Coliseum, Los Angeles, which was aquatics center for the 1932 Summer Olympics
- McDonald's Olympic Swim Stadium, now the Uytengsu Aquatics Center, at University of Southern California in Los Angeles. Built for the 1984 Summer Olympics, it has a long course 50x25 m pool and a 25x25m diving well.
- Dirks Pool at Spieker Aquatics Center, of UCLA, a 52-meter, all deep water pool with a diving platform as well as one-meter and three-meter diving boards
- Rose Bowl Aquatics Center, Pasadena, has competition pool and recreational pool

=== Georgia ===
- Aquatic Center of the Georgia Tech Campus Recreation Center, Atlanta, built for the 1996 Summer Olympics.

=== Illinois ===
- Olympic-sized pool at Portage Park, Chicago, hosted swimming events of the 1959 Pan American Games.

=== Michigan ===
- Canham Natatorium, University of Michigan campus, Ann Arbor, has an 8-lane competition pool,

=== Missouri ===
- Shaw Park, Clayton, a near suburb of St. Louis. It has an Olympic-sized swimming pool.

=== Nebraska ===
- Devaney Center Natatorium, Bob Devaney Sports Center, University of Nebraska–Lincoln campus, Lincoln. Built in 1976, it has a 25-yard pool.

=== New York ===
- Olympic sized pool at Riverbank State Park (Denny Farrell Riverbank State Park)

=== Oregon ===
- Howard M. Terpenning Recreation Complex, Beaverton, has a 50 m indoor pool.

=== Pennsylvania ===
- Nile Swim Club, Yeadon, the first Black-owned swimming pool in the United States

=== Virginia ===
- Marine Corps Base Quantico 8-lane 50 m pool, used in triathlons. Media related to Quantico 50m pool at Wikimedia Commons

=== Washington ===
- Weyerhaeuser King County Aquatic Center, Federal Way, constructed for the 1990 Goodwill Games. It has an Olympic competition and training pool and a diving pool.

== Zimbabwe ==
- unknown venue, Harare, as 1995 All-Africa Games included swimming events

== See also ==
- List of diving facilities
- List of hot springs
