= List of largest swimming pools =

There are a number of large swimming pools around the world, several of which are artificial lagoons. As of 2019, the Guinness World Record holder for the largest man-made lagoon is Citystars Sharm El Sheikh, located in Sharm El Sheikh, Egypt.

== List ==
Only extant completed artificial swimming pools larger than 1,000 m^{2} (11,000 sq ft) for which reliable size sourcing information is available are listed, sorted by surface area. Depth and volume are not taken into account. Note that this list may not be comprehensive as large swimming pools for which no reliable sources exist attesting to their size are not included.

Rank	Swimming Pool	Country	City	Area	Opened	Water	Notes	Coordinates
1	Citystars Sharm El Sheikh	Egypt	Sharm El Sheikh	96,800 m^{2} (1,042,000 sq ft)	2015	Sea water	Marketing material and press releases claim a larger area of 12.5 hectares (125,000 m^{2}; 1,350,000 sq ft)	28°1′41.2″N 34°23′38.7″E
2	San Alfonso del Mar	Chile	Algarrobo	80,000 m^{2} (860,000 sq ft)	2006	Sea water		33°21′2.68″S 71°39′11.81″W
3	Mahasamutr Lagoon	Thailand	Hua Hin	72,000 m^{2} (780,000 sq ft)	2014	Sea water		12°31′20.6″N 99°56′16.6″E
4	Treasure Bay Bintan	Indonesia	Bintan	63,000 m^{2} (680,000 sq ft)	2015	Sea water		
5	The Lagoon at Epperson	USA	Wesley Chapel	30,540.9 m^{2} (328,739 sq ft)	2017	Sea water		28.2727°N 82.2910°W
6	Balneario Carlos Xamena	Argentina	Salta	26,199 m^{2} (282,000 sq ft)		Fresh water		24°48′48.48″S 65°25′4.08″W
7	Freibad Fürstenfeld	Austria	Fürstenfeld	23,000 m^{2} (250,000 sq ft)	1966	Fresh water		47°03'23.2"N 16°04'06.8"E
8	The Lagoon at Windsong Ranch	USA	Prosper, Texas	23,230 m^{2} (250,000 sq ft)				33.23554, -96.86658
9	Laguna Las Brisas De Santo Domingo	Chile	Santo Domingo	22,000 m^{2} (240,000 sq ft)		Sea water		33°41′36.4″S 71°39′4.7″W
10	Peninsula	Romania	Cicarlau	18,000 m^{2} (193,750 sq ft)	2021	Fresh water		
11	Rabat municipal pool	Morocco	Rabat	17,000 m^{2} (182,986 sq ft)	2020	Sea Water	X4R6+7X9, Rabat	
12	Freibad Weyermannshaus	Switzerland	Bern	16,000 m^{2} (170,000 sq ft)	1908	Fresh water		46°56′51.7″N 7°24′18.8″E
13	Brentanobad	Germany	Frankfurt	11,000 m^{2} (118,403 sq ft)	1966	Fresh water		50°7′33.941″N 8°37′8.592″E
14	Dreamworld Resort	Pakistan	Karachi	8,903.1 m^{2} (95,832 sq ft)	2008	Well water		25°1′56.5″N 67°8′29.3″E
15	Hard Rock Guitar Hotel	USA	Hollywood, Florida	8,410 m^{2} (90,500 sq ft)	2019	Fresh water		26°03′06.09″N 80°12′33.51″W
16	Nakache été	France	Toulouse	7,500 m^{2} (81,000 sq ft)	1933	Fresh water		43°35′8.85″N 1°26′7.61″E
17	Sunlite Pool	USA	Cincinnati	7,450 m^{2} (80,200 sq ft)	1925	Fresh water		39°03′17.20″N 84°25′03.02″W
18	Bronte Creek Provincial Park	Canada	Oakville, Ontario	7,300 m^{2} (79,000 sq ft)	1972	Fresh water		43.4032341°N 79.7582572°W
19	Freibad Waschmühle	Germany	Kaiserslautern	7,200 m^{2} (78,000 sq ft)	1908			49°27'37"N 7°45'46"E
20	Balmorhea State Park	USA	Balmorhea	7,158.5 m^{2} (77,053 sq ft)	1930s	Fresh water		30°56′40″N 103°47′00″W
21	Outdoor pool Riviéra Brno	Czechia	Brno	6,510 m^{2} (70,100 sq ft)	1920	Municipal water	world´s largest stainless steel pool	49°11′9.55″N 16°34′20.98″E
22	Freibad	Germany	Ensdorf	6,250 m^{2} (67,300 sq ft)		Municipal water		49°18′40.5″N 6°47′18.79″E
23	Hansen Dam Recreation Center	USA	Los Angeles	6,100 m^{2} (65,000 sq ft)	1998	Municipal water		34°16′13.9″N 118°23′20.9″W
24	Lymington Sea Water Baths	UK	Lymington	5,500 m^{2}	1833	Sea Water		50°45′10.08″N 1°31′41.52″W
25	North Park Pool	USA	Pittsburgh	5,365 m^{2} (57,748 sq ft)	1937	Municipal water	2,250,000 gal.	40° 35' 19.6002"N79° 59' 41.6466"W
26	Oak Ridge Outdoor Pool	USA	Oak Ridge	5,100 m^{2} (54,000 sq ft)	1944	Fresh water		36.0160°N 84.2658°W
27	Astoria Park Pool	USA	New York City	5,059 m^{2} (54,450 sq ft)	1936	Fresh water		40.7789°N 73.9224°W
28	Pearce Pool	USA	Jackson	4,394.7 m^{2} (47,304 sq ft)	1960s	Fresh water		31.5029°N 87.8884°W
29	Europasportpark	Germany	Berlin	3,391 m^{2} (36,500 sq ft)	1999	Municipal water		52.52966°N 13.45384°E
30	Tooting Bec Lido	UK	London	2,800 m^{2} (30,000 sq ft)	1906	Fresh water		51° 25′ 54″ N, 0° 8′ 21″ W
31	Budlong Pool	USA	Cranston, Rhode Island	2,029 m^{2} (21,840 sq ft)	1950s	Municipal water		
32	Neutral Buoyancy Laboratory	USA	Houston	1,914.2 m^{2} (20,604 sq ft)	1995			29°36′25.4″N 95°8′36.8″W
33	Crystalbrook Riley	Australia	Cairns	1,000.0 m^{2} (10,764 sq ft)	2018	Tropical oasis		
34	Oaks Pacific Blue Resort	Australia	Salamander Bay (Port Stephens)	3,500.000 m^{2} (37,673.69 sq ft)	2007	Lagoon pool, separate 25-metre lap pool and outdoor spas		

== Other swimming pool superlatives ==
Swimming pool	Country	City	Opened	Notes	Coordinates
Marina Bay Sands	Singapore	Downtown Core	2010	World's highest and longest rooftop infinity pool at 200 metres (650 feet) high and 150 metres (490 feet) long	1°16′59.2″N 103°51′34.5″E
Deep Dive Dubai	United Arab Emirates	Dubai	2020	World's deepest pool at 60.02 metres (196.9 feet) deep	25°7′40.08″N 55°17′42.36″E
