= Tøyen Park =

Park in Oslo municipality, Norway

Coordinates: 59°55′03″N 10°46′39″E

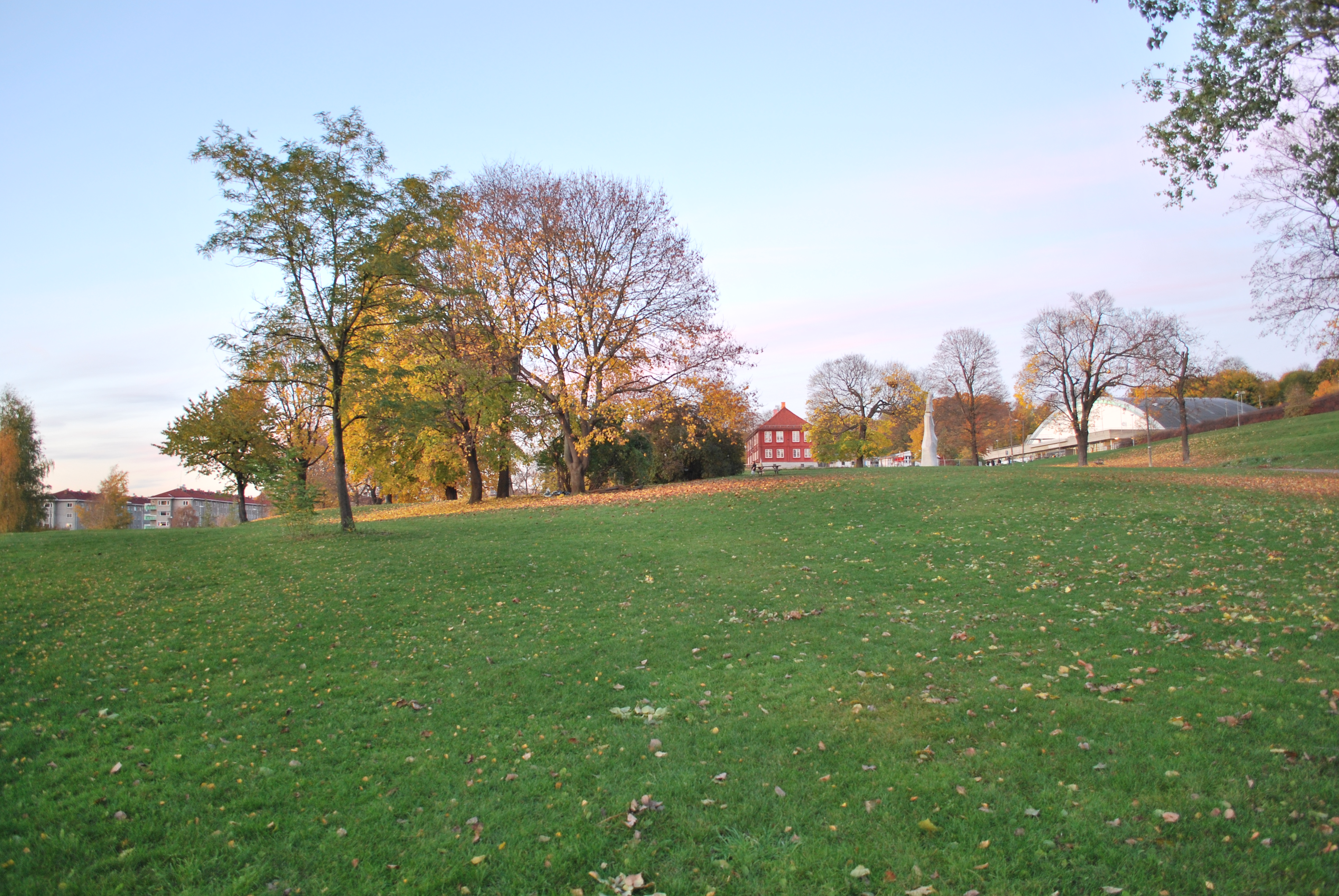
Tøyen Park

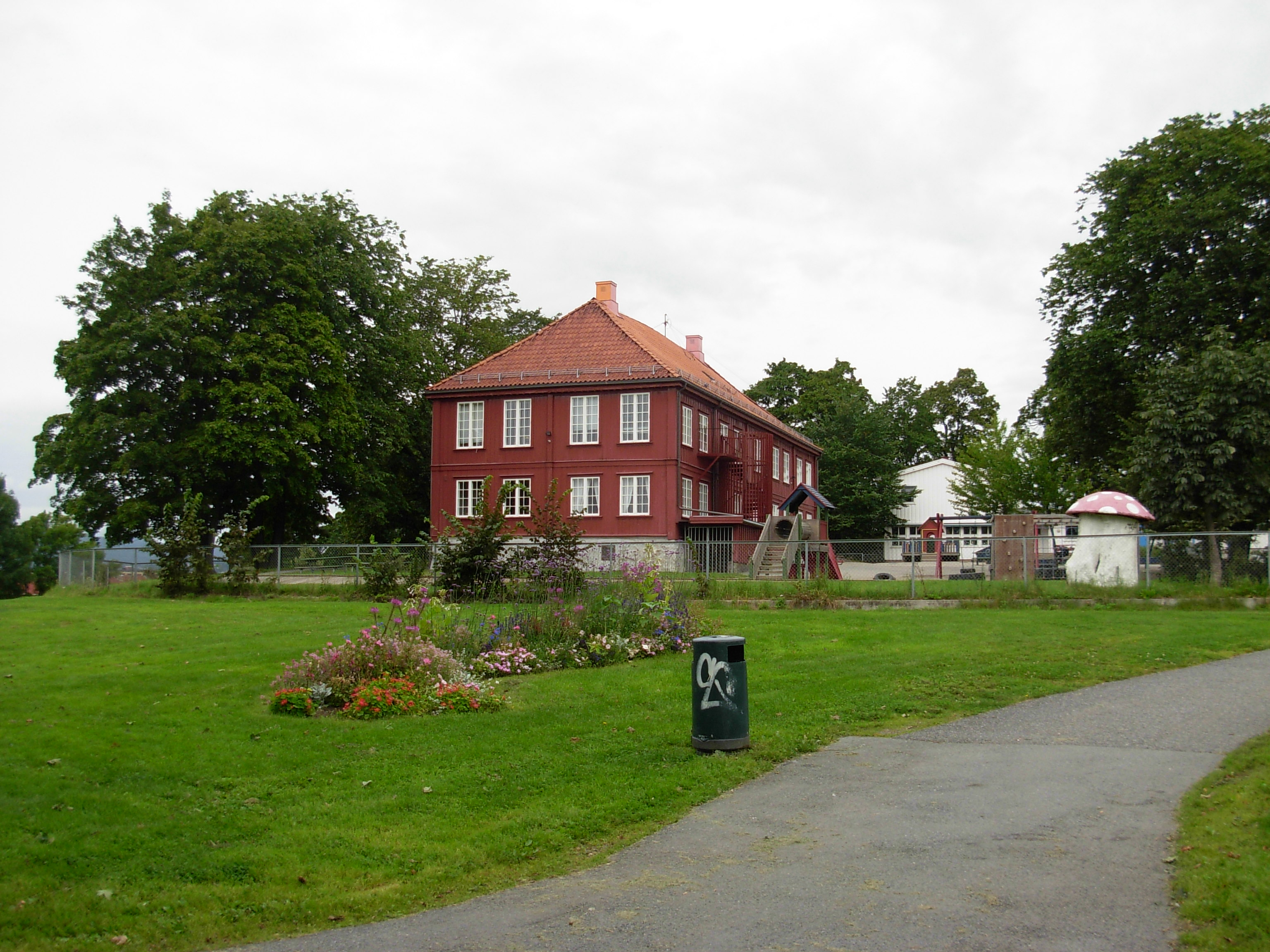
Bellevue in Tøyenparken. Photo by Helge Høifødt

Tøyen Park (Norwegian: Tøyenparken) is a park in Oslo, Norway. It is located to the north-east of the old Munch Museum and neighbours the University of Oslo Botanical Gardens.

Tøyen Park is an expanse of grass-covered hills, dotted with clusters of large trees. Like most parks in Oslo, Tøyen Park is a popular recreation area. During summer, groups of people barbecue and fly frisbees, while during winter, tobogganing down the hills is popular. Tøyen Park attracts birdwatchers, where frequently seen birds include the hawfinch. Since 2014, the annual music festival Øyafestivalen has been held here every summer.

Tøyenbadet contains indoor and outdoor swimming pools. The water park features a swimming hall and several open-air pools along with a waterslide and sauna. There is an indoor climbing wall. Small children have their own pool. The outdoor pool is open year-round. The park provides a dressing area and shower facilities.
