= Júlio Delamare Aquatics Centre =

Swimming venue in Rio de Janeiro, Brazil

Coordinates: 22.9123°S 43.2278°W

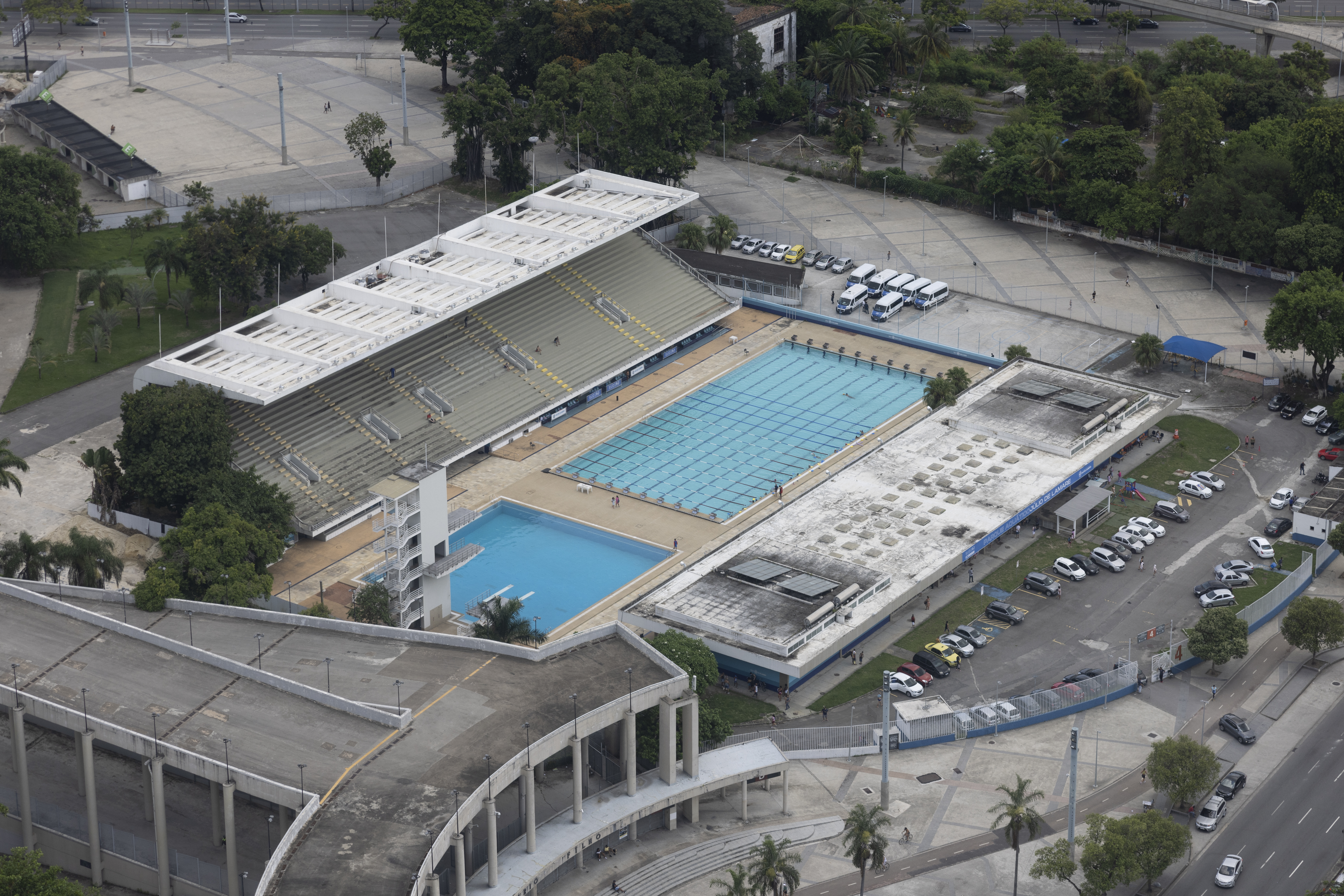
Rio de Janeiro - Júlio Delamare Aquatics Centre

Júlio Delamare Aquatics Centre is located in the Maracanã neighbourhood of Rio de Janeiro, Brazil. It is one of the main swimming facilities in Rio and opened in 1978. It was named after the sports journalist Júlio Delamare, a supporter of its creation, who died five years before its inauguration. He died on the Varig Flight 820, in France. The plane caught on fire, causing it to crash.

== See also ==
- Maria Lenk Aquatic Center
- Swimming Olympic Centre of Bahia
