= Júlio Delamare =

Brazilian journalist and sports commentator

- Born: Júlio Barbosa Delamare; July 1, 1928; Rio de Janeiro, Brazil
- Died: July 11, 1973 (aged 45); Orly, France
- Occupation: Sports journalist

Júlio Barbosa Delamare (July 1, 1928 – July 11, 1973) was a Brazilian sports journalist who worked as a journalist and sports commentator for the newspaper O Globo for more than ten years and for the television network Rede Globo, where he was the first director of the sports department.

== Death ==
He died on Varig Flight 820, in France. The plane caught on fire, causing it to crash. The Júlio Delamare Aquatics Centre, situated in Rio de Janeiro, was named after him, five years after the accident that caused his death.
