= Deepspot =

Deep swimming pool in Poland

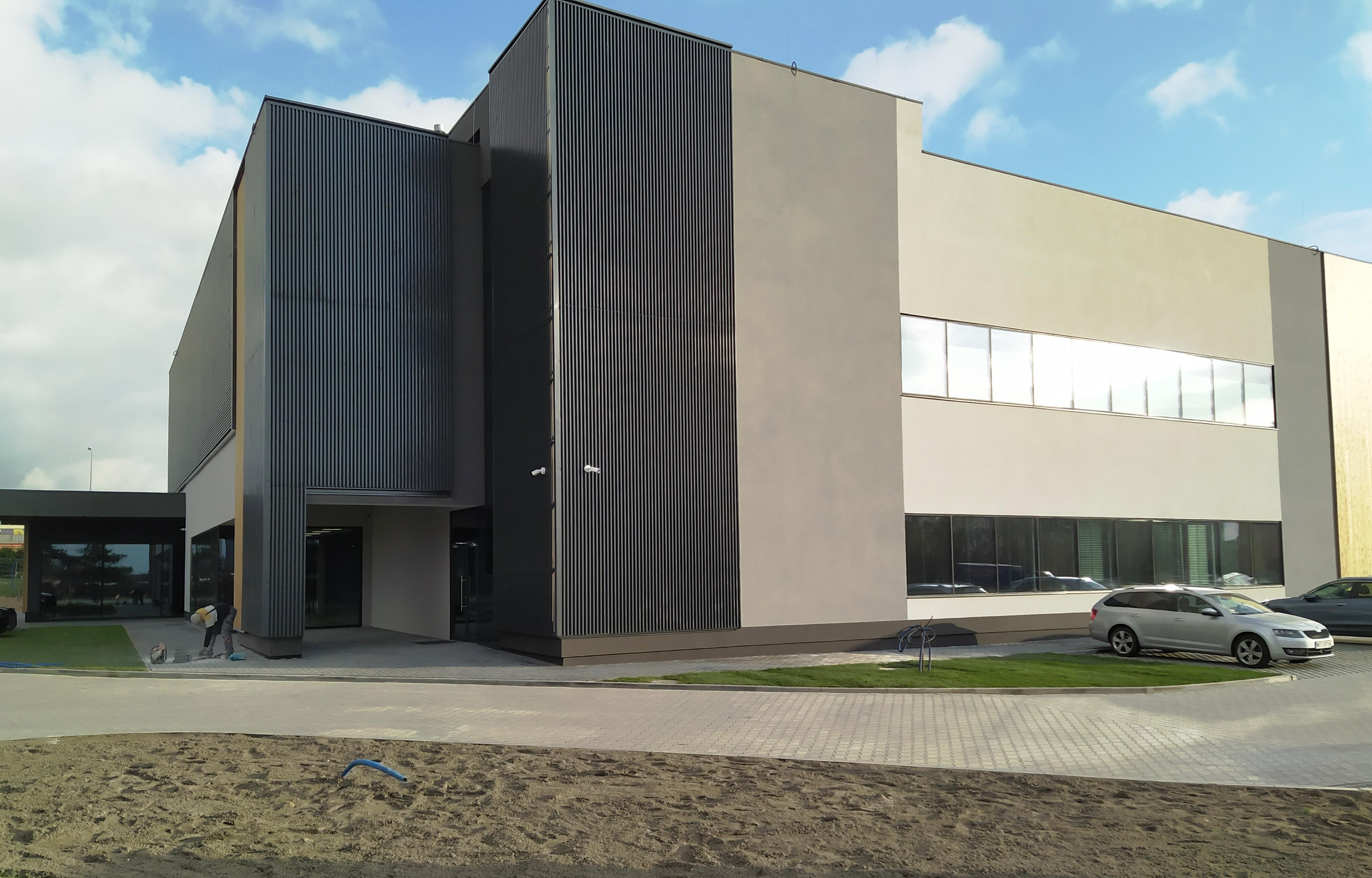
- The Deepspot facility
- Interactive map of Deepspot
- Address: Mszczonów, Poland
- Coordinates: 51°58′40.4″N 20°31′29.4″E
- Pool size: 45 metres (148 ft) deep

Construction
- Built: 2019–2020
- Opened: December 2020
- Architect: Aerotunel

Website
- www.deepspot.com

Deepspot is a 45-metre (148 ft) deep swimming pool and scuba diving training center, located near Warsaw in Mszczonów, Poland. It held the record for being the deepest swimming pool in the world until June 2021, (Note: Previously the record holder for deepest pool was the Y-40 "Deep Joy", in the northern Italian town of Montegrotto Terme at 42 metres (138 feet).) when the 60-metre (200 ft) Deep Dive Dubai was opened.

Deepspot is designed as a practice and training site for divers with varying levels of experience who wish to develop additional diving skills. The facility opened in December 2020 at an estimated cost of 8.75 million euros ($10.6 million US dollars) and over two years of construction. 5,000 cubic metres (180,000 cu ft) of concrete and 1,000 tonnes (1,000,000 kg) of steel were used to create the pool, and it contains 8,000 cubic metres (280,000 cu ft) of water.

The facility and pool have numerous special features to facilitate training, including a simulated blue hole going down to the deepest point in the pool, artificial underwater caves and archaeological ruins for training in overhead environments, and a small simulated shipwreck. There is an underwater observation tunnel for spectators, and a hotel adjoining the pool with underwater rooms at 5 meters depth and viewing areas are under construction.

The facility is mainly intended for recreational diving and professional training; however, Deepspot also offers training to police, fire, medical, and military personnel needing proficiency in technical and professional diving disciplines.

It is owned by Michał Braszczyński who also owns FlySpot, in Warsaw, Poland. At Deepspot's opening it became the world's deepest swimming pool, exceeding Y-40 Deep Joy in Montegrotto Terme, Italy and Nemo 33 in Brussels, Belgium.

Deepspot is now known as the world's second deepest swimming pool, after Deep Dive Dubai in the United Arab Emirates.

== See also ==
- World Recreational Scuba Training Council
- Blue Abyss
- Nemo 33
- Y-40 pool
