= Fernando Fischmann =

Chilean biochemist and property developer

- Born: Santiago, Chile
- Education: University of Chile
- Occupations: Real state investor, entrepreneur, biochemist
- Known for: Artificial lagoons
- Title: Founder of Crystal Lagoons, Board member of Inmobiliaria El Plomo
- Awards: Ernst & Young “Best Entrepreneur Award”
- Scientific career
- Fields: Biochemistry

Fernando Fischmann is a Chilean scientist, businessman, biochemist, and real estate developer, whose project is the Crystal Lagoons innovation.

== Biography ==
Fernando Fischmann was born in Santiago. He attended the Grange School in Santiago and then the University of Chile, earning a graduate degree in biochemistry. In 1986, Fischmann bought 60 hectares of land at the port of Algarrobo, on the coast of central Chile, with the plan to develop a holiday resort, that is now known as San Alfonso del Mar, built around an artificial crystalline lagoon. Fischmann developed a new process for maintaining the purity and clarity of the water in large volumes and at low cost.

In 2016, he won "The Stevie Award" in its two categories: Innovator of the Year, for his sustainable vision for water usage, and Innovation of the Year, for his water desalination technology that uses no energy. In addition, the London Business School nominated Fischmann for its 2017 international innovation contest, the "Real Innovation Award" In 2021 he was awarded with The World Intellectual Property Organization (WIPO) Medal for Inventors.

Fischmann is one of the directors of Chilean Fraunhofer institute. In addition, he is director of the North America Chamber of Commerce (AmCham), and is a member of the advisory council of the business network Endeavor (non-profit).

=== Crystal Lagoons ===
Crystal Lagoons is an American biochemical and water services company founded by Fernando Fischmann in 2009. The Boston Consulting Group evaluated eight companies at US$1.8 billion, after a three years in operation.
