= Nemo 33 =

Indoor recreational diving facility in Brussels, Belgium

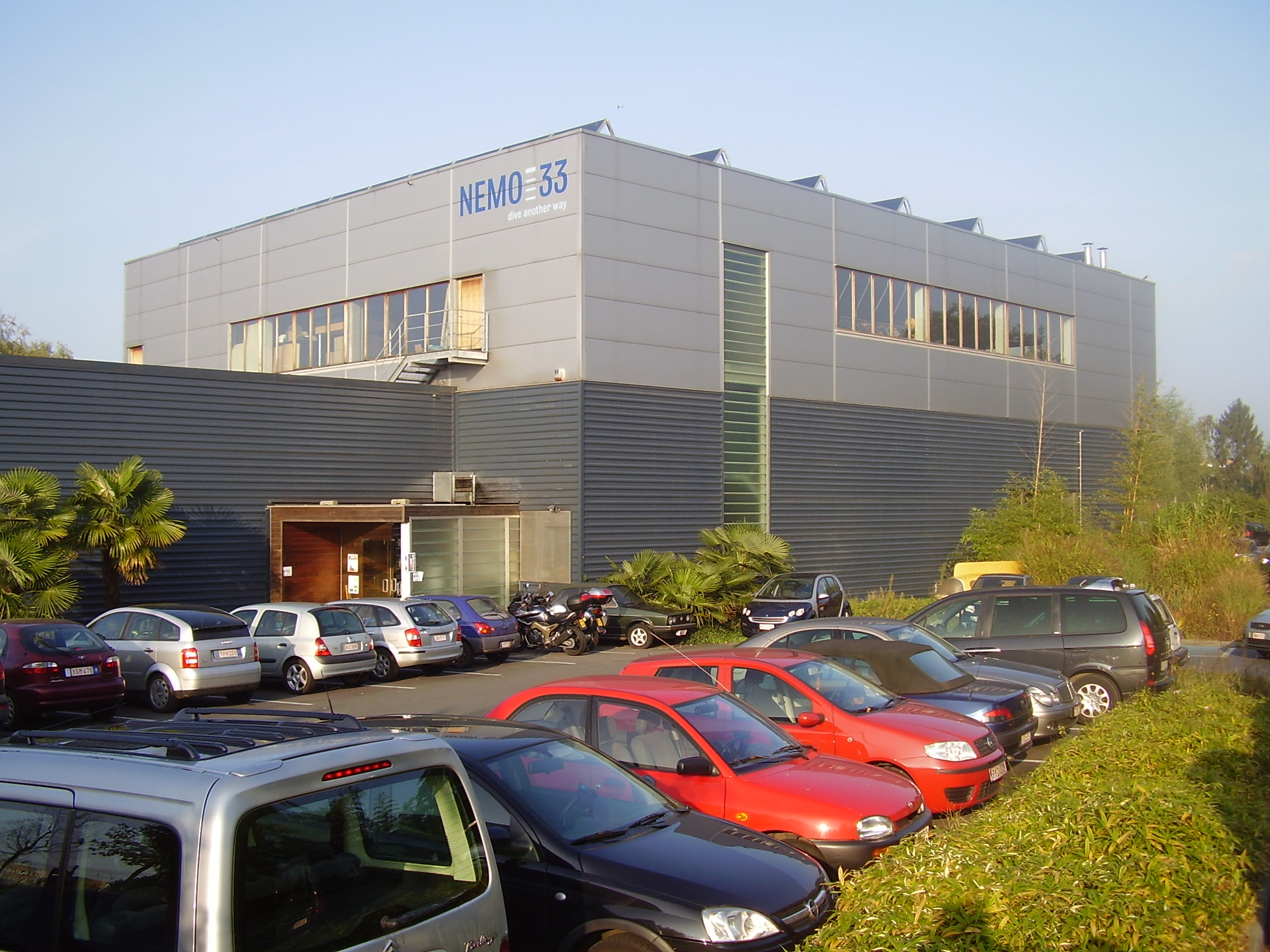
- Exterior of Nemo 33
- Interactive map of Nemo 33
- Location: Brussels, Belgium
- Coordinates: 50.796211°N 4.316468°E
- Pool size: 34.5 metres (113 ft) deep

Construction
- Opened: 5 June 2014

Website
- www.nemo33.com

Nemo 33 is an indoor non-chlorinated fresh water facility in the municipality of Uccle in Brussels, Belgium. It previously held the Guinness World Record as the deepest indoor swimming pool in the world between its opening on 1 May 2004, and the completion of "Y-40 The Deep Joy" at Hotel Terme Millepini in Montegrotto Terme, Padua, Italy, on 5 June 2014.

The pool's maximum depth is 34.5 metres (113 ft). It contains 2,500,000 litres (550,000 imp gal; 660,000 US gal) of non-chlorinated, highly filtered spring water, maintained at 30 °C (86 °F) by a solar heater, and holds several simulated underwater caves at the 10 metres (33 ft) depth level. Due to the warm temperature in the pool, divers can dive for extended periods without a dry suit. The complex was designed by Belgian diving expert John Beernaerts as a multipurpose diving instruction, recreational, and film production facility in 2004. Popular Mechanics rates Nemo 33 as one of the top eighteen strangest pools in the world.

== Safety ==
The facility allows tourists, amateur divers, and professional divers. It requires that divers be at least 12 years of age and in good health. All divers must be either certified or supervised by a trainer. All divers must have a certified diver as a dive buddy.

== Features ==
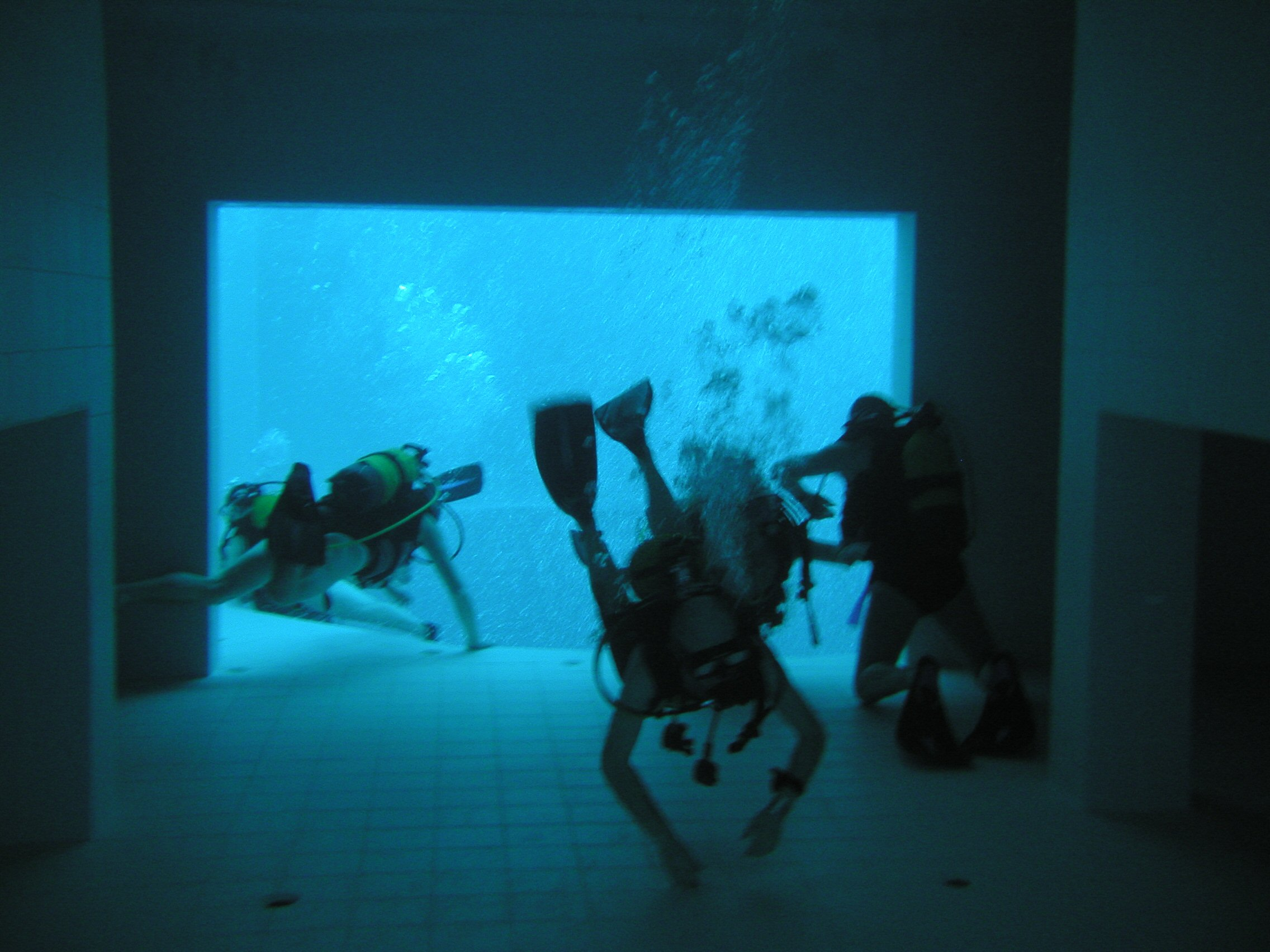
An underwater house at Nemo, with the 34.5 m deep pit in the background

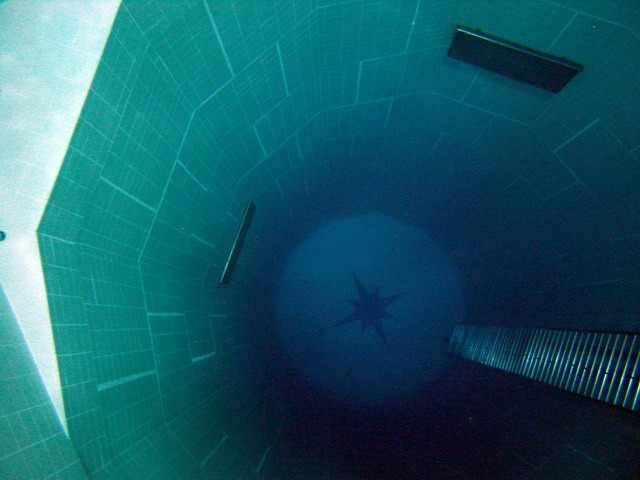
The view down into the deep pit at Nemo 33

The facility contains a restaurant, bookshop, swimwear store, souvenir store, and rooms for other water activities. There are numerous underwater windows that allow outside visitors and spectators to look into the pools at various depths. It also offers tours around the city of Brussels.

Nemo 33 now stands as one of the deepest swimming pools in the world, exceeded by Y-40 The Deep Joy in Italy, Deepspot in Poland, and Deep Dive Dubai in the United Arab Emirates.

== See also ==
- Deep Dive Dubai (60 metres (200 ft) deep pool)
- Blue Abyss
- Deepspot (45 metres (148 ft) deep pool)
- Y-40 (42.15 metres (138.3 ft) deep pool)
