= Lymington Open Air Sea Water Baths =

Outdoor swimming pool in Lymington, Hampshire, England

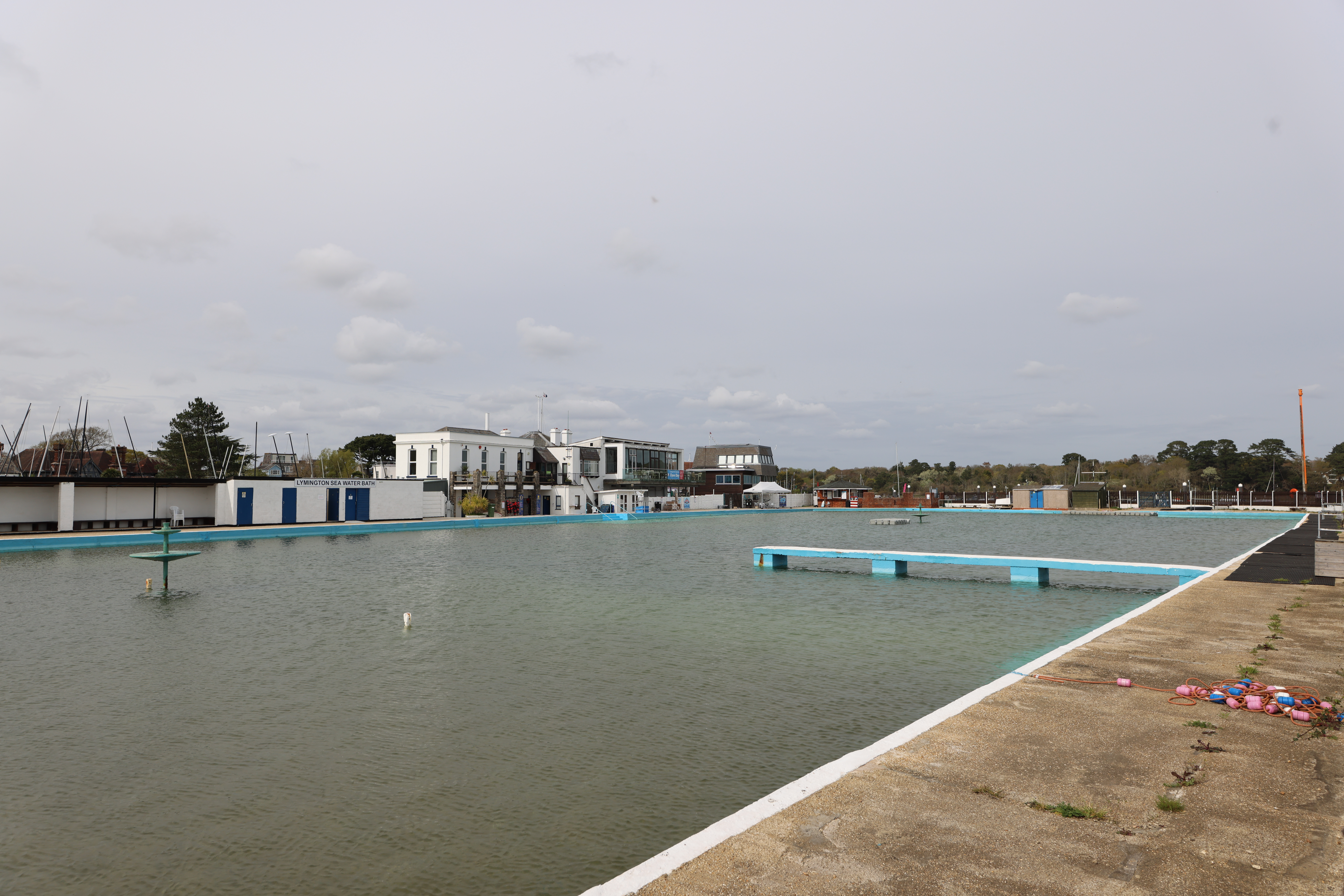
- April 2025
- Interactive map of Lymington Open Air Sea Water Baths
- Location: Bath Road, Lymington, SO41 3RU
- Coordinates: 50.7528°N 1.5282°W
- Owner: Lymington and Pennington Town Council
- Type: seawater lido
- Dimensions: Length: 110 metres (361 ft); Width: 50 metres (164 ft)

Construction
- Opened: 1833
- Closed: 2008 (reopened 2010)

The Lymington Open Air Sea Water Baths (or "historic Roman Seawater Baths") is a lifeguarded open air lido in Lymington, Hampshire, England. Built in 1833, it is the oldest lido in the United Kingdom, and at 110 metres long by 50 metres wide it is also one of the largest in area. The baths reopened in 2010 following a campaign by local people who also completed the baths' refurbishment.

== Description ==
The pool uses filtered and chlorinated seawater.

Owned and managed by Lymington and Pennington Town Council, the opening season is normally from May to September.

== History ==
A seawater pool and smaller baths were on the same site in the 1780s. (There was a Roman camp near Lymington (Lentune, Lementon), but there is no evidence of baths.)

The current lido was built in 1833 by William Bartlett of the Lymington Bath and Improvement Co. with donations of £6,000. From 1872 the lido was run by Mrs Beeston. The local Corporation acquired the site in 1937.

The main building, erected from the elegant and gratuitous design of Mr. William Bartlett, of this town; and the machinery fixed under the direction of Mr. John Silvester, civil engineer, affords every convenience for hot, cold or vapour bathing: one wing being appropriated for the use of ladies, the other for gentlemen.

— A new guide for Lymington, 1841

The local St Barbe Museum has information on the history of the pool.
