= Hotel Terme Millepini =

Hotel with 40m deep underwater diving pool

- Hotel logo
- Interactive map of the Hotel Terme Millepini area

General information
- Type: Hotel
- Location: Montegrotto Terme, Padua, Italy, Via Cataio 42, Montegrotto Terme, Italy 35036
- Coordinates: 45.318966°N 11.784396°E
- Opened: 1997
- Renovated: 2013

Design and construction
- Awards: Guinness World Records for Deepest Swimming Pool for Diving

Renovating team
- Architect: Emanuele Boaretto

Other information
- Number of rooms: 100

Website
- http://www.millepini.it/

Hotel Terme Millepini is a four-star hotel in Montegrotto Terme, Padua, Italy. It contains 100 rooms and until 2020 was recognized for having the world's deepest pool, the Y-40, which put it in the Guinness World Records. The hotel was first built in 1997 and renovated in 2013.

== Y-40 pool ==
The pool's logo

Y-40 "The Deep Joy" pool first opened on 5 June 2014 and was designed by architect Emanuele Boaretto. It is 42.15 metres (138 ft) deep, which at the time of opening made it the deepest pool in the world. It contains 4,300 cubic metres (1,136,000 US gal) of thermal water kept at a temperature of 32–34 °C (90–93 °F). The pool features underwater caves and a suspended, transparent, underwater tunnel for guests to walk through. It includes platforms at various depths, ranging from 1.3 metres (4.3 ft) to 12 metres (39 ft), before the walls of the pool narrow into a well-like funnel which plunges straight down to 40 metres (131 ft). The hotel offers tickets to freedive and scuba dive. Italian freediver Umberto Pelizzari first measured the depth before the pool was opened.

When it opened on 5 June 2014, it was awarded the "Deepest Swimming Pool for Diving" by the Guinness World Records. That record was previously held by the Nemo 33 pool in Belgium.

Y-40 now stands as the third deepest swimming pool in the world, exceeded only by Deepspot in Poland, and Deep Dive Dubai in the United Arab Emirates.

=== Thermal hot spring water ===
The thermal waters originate in deep underground sources at a temperature of more than 40°C. The mineral rich waters are of a salt-bromine-iodine profile having high levels of sodium chloride, bromine and iodine and bromine as well as trace minerals. The water emerges from the source at 87°C similar to other thermal waters in the Euganeo basin. It is cooled before collecting in the soaking pools and swimming pools.

== Gallery ==
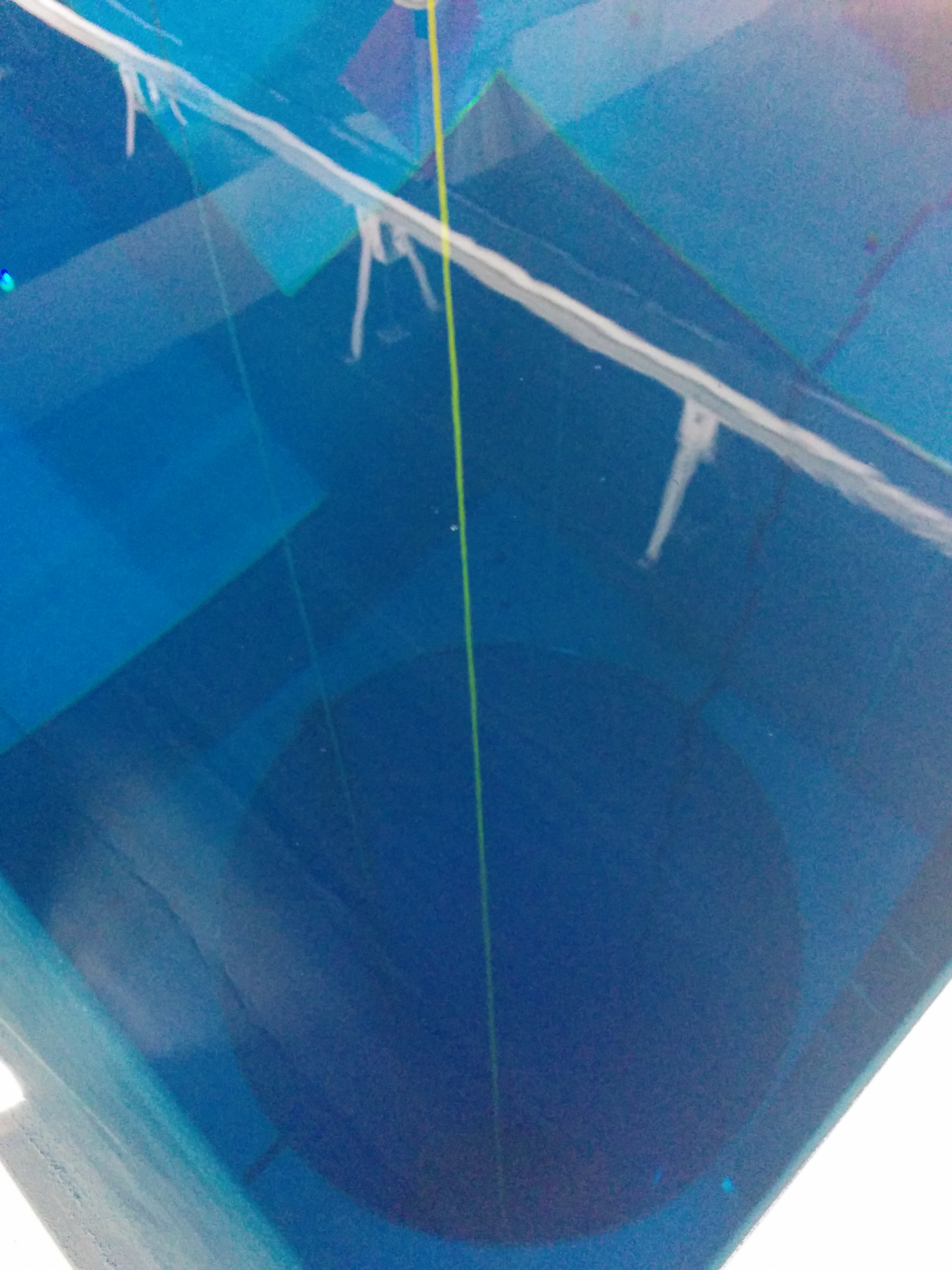
View of the funnel that goes down 40 m

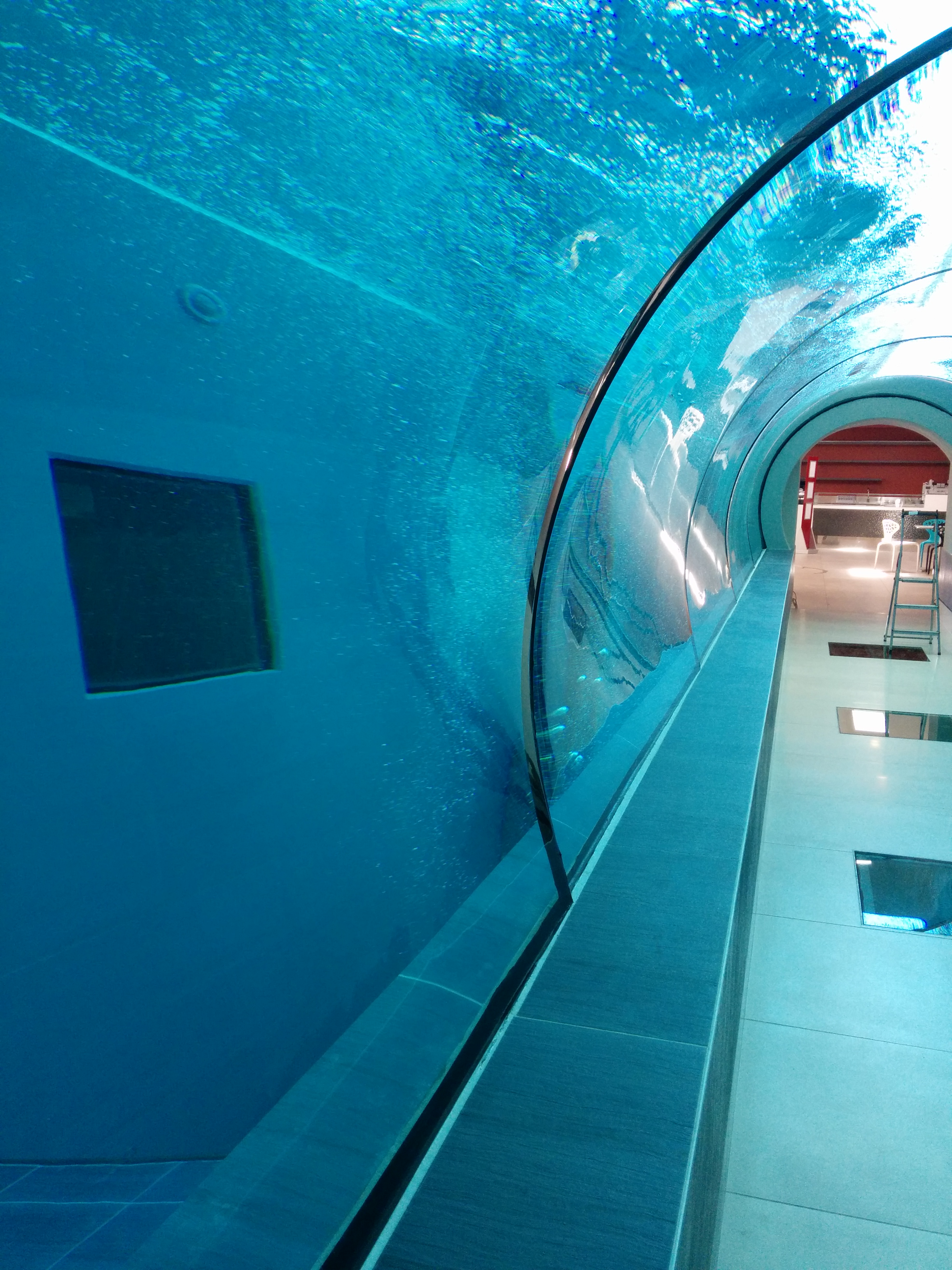
View from the tunnel that guests can walk through in the pool

== See also ==
- Blue Abyss, England (planned deep pool)
- Deepspot, Poland (45 metres (148 ft) deep pool)
- Deep Dive Dubai (60 metres (200 ft) deep pool)
- Nemo 33, Belgium (34.5 metres (113 ft) deep pool)
