= Østfoldbadet =

Water park located in Askim, Norway

Coordinates: 59°35′01″N 11°10′05″E

Østfoldbadet is a water park located in Askim, Norway. The park was officially opened on December 16, 2000. Construction commenced on August 31, 1999 and was completed in December 2000.

== History ==
David Koht-Norbye was hired as the operating company's managing director in April 2000. Construction took two years, and was interrupted by a strike in 2000. Construction cost 62.5 million Norwegian krone. The pool opened on 16 December 2000 by King Harald V. This was the first time since 1964 that Askim had received a royal visit. The municipality has guaranteed for an operating deficit of NOK 1.5 million per year. Mayor Hans Jakobsen stated that he hoped it would become a tourist attraction.

As of 2010, the pool regularly experienced people bathing fully dressed, especially immigrants from Asia. Bathing dressed was regarded as repulsive by some bathers, while those bathing in clothes stated that it was common in their home country and that they were too bashful to bathe in a bathing suit.

== Facilities ==
The pool complex has a capacity for 500 people. In addition it has a wet café with capacity for 175 people. The main pool is 25 by 12.5 meters (82 by 41 ft) with a maximum depth of 3.8 meters (12 ft) and a minimum of 1.5 meters (4 ft 11 in). There are four diving boards (1 meter (3 ft 3 in), 2.7 meters (8 ft 10 in), 3 meters (9.8 ft) and 5 meters (16 ft)). There is a 25-by-10-meter (82 by 33 ft) wave pool, a 6-by-6-meter (20 by 20 ft) play pool, a 10.5-by-7-meter (34 by 23 ft) hot pool, wet and dry saunas and slides.
