= Blue Abyss =

Proposed deep-water diving and research pool

Blue Abyss is a research pool planned for construction in Cornwall, England, United Kingdom. It will be 50 metres (160 ft) deep with a volume of approximately 42,000 cubic metres (1,500,000 cu ft), making it the world's second deepest pool after the Deep Dive Dubai.

The Blue Abyss pool will be used for training and development for commercial diving, space exploration, human life science, and submersibles. This pool could aid in reducing risk in extreme environments, including space and the sub-aquatic.

== The pool ==
The pool itself will have several entrance points and includes a series of depths. The multi-level depths of the pool has many functions, including 'Astrolab' at 12 metres (39 ft). The total surface area of the pool is planned to be 50 by 40 metres (160 ft × 130 ft), and its deepest point at 50 metres (160 ft), giving a total volume of 42,000m$^3$ of water. The pool was designed by architect Robin Partington.

The facility itself will include:

- A multi-layered pool
- Sliding roof to facilitate insertion of larger objects into pool
- Astronaut training centre
- Hypobaric and hyperbaric chambers
- Microgravity suite
- Training center with six classrooms
- Diving quality compressed gas supply (air and nitrox)
- Secure workshops, lay down areas and storage
- Onsite catering
- Hotel

== Commercial diving ==
The Blue Abyss will aid in testing, training, and pre-operational exercises for the commercial diving sector. The pools indoor facility will allow for diving any time and year round. The facility will not be dependent on weather. A 30-tonne crane and lifting platforms will allow for roof access to the pool, and the sliding roof will facilitate access to insert larger training objects into the pool. The pool will allow for deep water training for offshore and inshore commercial divers and diving teams. This training will include scenarios and conditions that otherwise would be impossible for safe diving training. This would allow for an acceleration of emergency services, oceanographic research, archaeology, and civil engineering.

== Submersibles ==
Submersible vehicles are a new alternative to classic diving methods. The indoor pool will permit a controlled environment allowing for submersible trials and training, including simulations. This would reduce the risk of subsea operations by moving trials and training into a safe and heavily monitored facility. Testing and training is expected to include hydrographic, pipeline and cable surveys, inspections of wind turbine foundations, vessel hulls and installations, oceanographic studies, and even film production. The pool will include roof access, as well as an R&D capability for new ROV and AUV sub-systems.

== Space exploration ==
The Blue Abyss will provide a facility for spaceflight simulation, like a mission to Mars simulation. It will offer safety and experience for astronauts undergoing human spaceflight training. The facility will include a neutral buoyancy pool, parabolic flight and centrifuge training, hypo and hyperbaric chambers and micro-gravity simulation suite, and an environmental research centre.

== Human life science ==
The centre will provide human physiology and human robotic interface R&D capabilities. This will allow for extreme environment research, including human spaceflight.

The Kuehnegger Human Performance Centre will have astronaut and athlete test and evaluation facilities, with full-body suspension and hypobaric chambers for altitude training.

== See also ==
- Deep Dive Dubai (60 metres (200 ft) deep pool)
- Nemo 33 (34.5 metres (113 ft) deep pool)
- Deepspot (45 metres (148 ft) deep pool)
- Y-40 (42.15 metres (138.3 ft) deep pool)
