= Varig Flight 820 =

1973 aviation accident in France

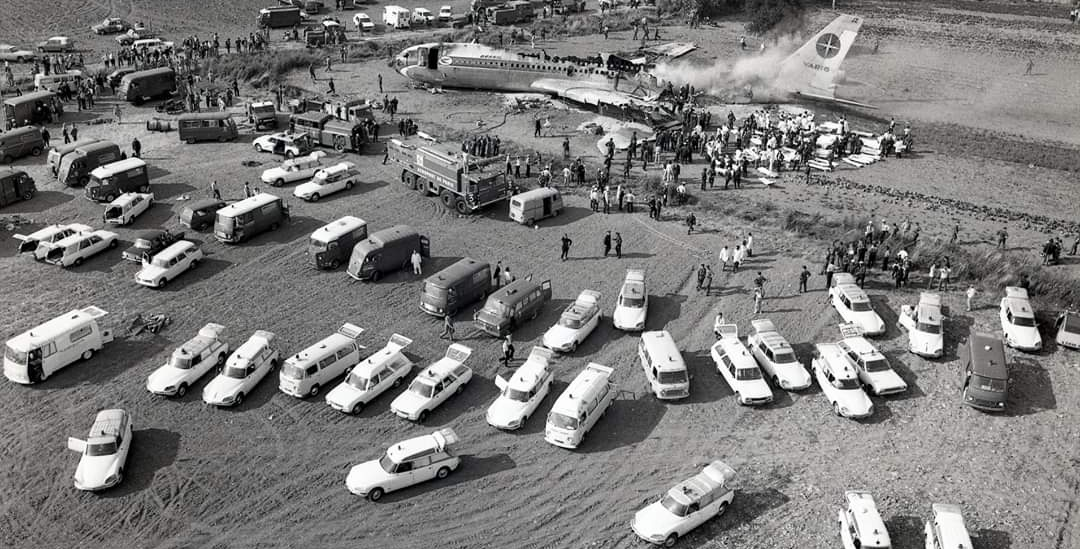
- Wreckage of the aircraft

Accident
- Date: 11 July 1973
- Summary: Belly landing following in-flight fire
- Site: Near Orly Airport, Orly, Paris, France; 48°40′56.8″N 2°16′22.1″E

Aircraft
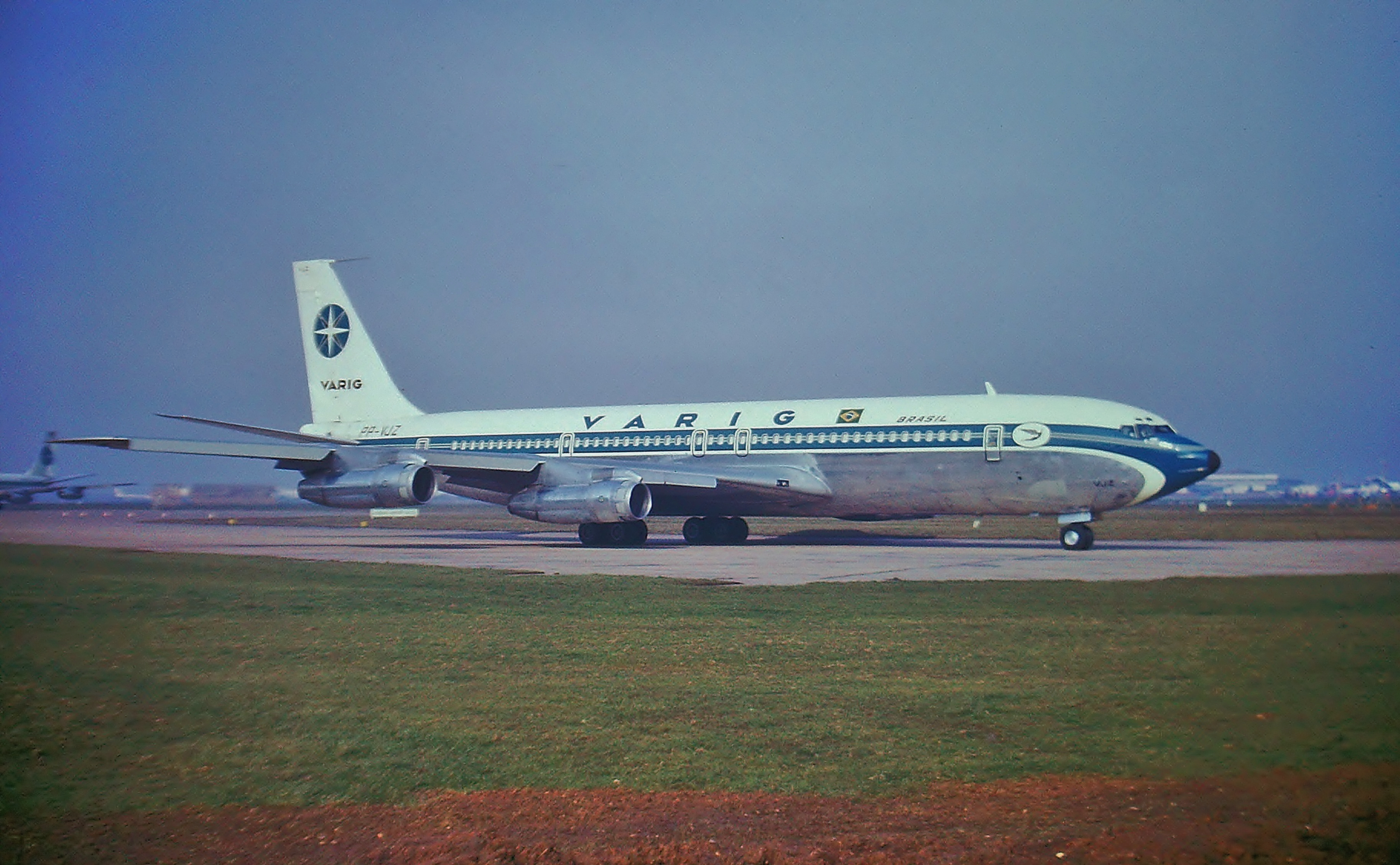
- PP-VJZ, the aircraft involved in the accident, seen in 1970
- Aircraft type: Boeing 707-320C
- Operator: Varig
- IATA flight No.: RG820
- ICAO flight No.: VRG820
- Call sign: VARIG 820
- Registration: PP-VJZ
- Flight origin: Galeão International Airport, Rio de Janeiro, Brazil
- Stopover: Orly Airport, Paris, France
- Destination: Heathrow Airport, London, United Kingdom
- Occupants: 134
- Passengers: 117
- Crew: 17
- Fatalities: 123
- Injuries: 11
- Survivors: 11

Varig Flight 820 was a scheduled flight of the Brazilian airline Varig that departed from Galeão International Airport in Rio de Janeiro, Brazil, on 11 July 1973, for Orly Airport, in Paris, France. The Boeing 707, registration PP-VJZ, made an emergency landing in onion fields about 5 km (2.7 nmi) from Orly Airport, due to smoke in the cabin from a lavatory fire. The fire caused 123 deaths; there were only 11 survivors (ten crew members and one passenger). Relief Captain Antonio Fuzimoto was the pilot who handled the controls and landed the plane in the field.

== Background ==
=== Aircraft ===
The Boeing 707-320C with registration PP-VJZ, was manufactured in February 1968 and had flown 21,470 hours. Varig briefly leased it to Seaboard World Airlines, but otherwise owned and operated the aircraft for the entirety of its life. The aircraft had seating capacity for 124 passengers and was operating close to full on the accident flight.

=== Crew ===
The crew aboard the flight consisted of four flight crew, four relief flight crew, and nine cabin crew. The primary flight crew consisted of Captain Gilberto Araújo da Silva, 49, First Officer Alvio Basso, 46, Flight Engineer Claunor Bello, 38, and Navigator Zilmar Gomes da Cunha, 43. Captain Araújo da Silva was highly experienced and had flown 17,959 hours, of which 4,642 hours were on the 707. First Officer Basso was also very experienced, with 12,613 flying hours, of which 5,055 hours were on the 707. Both Bello and Gomes da Cunha were also highly experienced airmen with 9,655 hours and 14,140 hours in total respectively; between them they had 8,113 hours on the 707.

The relief flight crew consisted of Captain Antonio Fuzimoto, 45, First Officer Ronald Utermoehl, 23, Flight Engineer Carlos Nato Diefenthaler, 38 and Navigator Salvador Ramos Heleno, 45. Relief Captain Fuzimoto was also very experienced, with 17,788 flying hours total, of which 3,221 were on the 707. Relief First Officer Utermoehl was much less experienced, with only 1,540 hours in total, of which only 768 were on the 707. Relief Flight Engineer Diefenthaler and Relief Navigator Heleno were both very experienced airmen, with 16,672 and 15,157 flying hours, respectively, and 17,859 total hours between them on the 707.

== Accident ==
Flight 820's problems began when a fire started in a rear lavatory shortly after the aircraft had descended to 8,000 feet (2,400 m) on its approach to Paris - Orly Airport. Crew members moved to the front of the airplane toward the emergency exit, as many passengers in the rear of the plane inhaled smoke. Prior to the forced landing, many of the passengers had already died of carbon monoxide poisoning and smoke inhalation. The aircraft landed in a field 5 km (2.7 nmi) short of the runway, in a full-flap and gear-down configuration.

Of the 134 passengers and crew aboard the flight, ten crew and one passenger, 21-year-old Ricardo Trajano, survived. Of the crew, Captain Araújo da Silva, First Officer Basso, Flight Engineer Bello, Navigator Gomes da Cunha, Relief Captain Fuzimoto, Chief Purser Galleti and Attendants Pires de Oliveira and Piha were in the cockpit and evacuated from there, and Tersis and Brandão escaped out of the forward galley. Trajano was found unconscious with Relief Navigator Heleno, Attendant Balbino and another passenger; Balbino and the passenger died at the scene, whereas Heleno died in a hospital eleven days later. Araújo da Silva would later be involved in the disappearance of Varig Flight 967.

== Cause ==
A possible cause of the fire was that the lavatory waste bin contents caught fire after a lit cigarette was thrown into it. Consequently, the FAA issued AD 74-08-09 requiring "installation of placards prohibiting smoking in the lavatory and disposal of cigarettes in the lavatory waste receptacles; establishment of a procedure to announce to airplane occupants that smoking is prohibited in the lavatories; installation of ashtrays at certain locations; and repetitive inspections to ensure that lavatory waste receptacle doors operate correctly".

== Passengers ==
Most of the passengers on the aircraft were Brazilian. The only survivors were in the cockpit and the first several rows of seats. Of the 11 survivors, 10 were members of the crew; the sole surviving passenger disobeyed instructions to remain in his seat.

Notable passengers who died included:

- Jörg Bruder, Olympic sailor
- Filinto Müller, President of the Senate of Brazil
- Agostinho dos Santos, singer and composer
- Joe Baxter, Argentine fascist guerrilla fighter
- Júlio Delamare, sports journalist

== See also ==
- Air Canada Flight 797, another accident caused by a fire in the aircraft lavatory
- Saudia Flight 163
- ValuJet Flight 592
- Varig Flight 967, another flight that was piloted by Captain Araujo da Silva that disappeared over the Pacific Ocean.
