= Wezenberg Olympic Swimming Center =

Swimming center in Antwerp, Belgium

Coordinates: 51.192761°N 4.406371°E

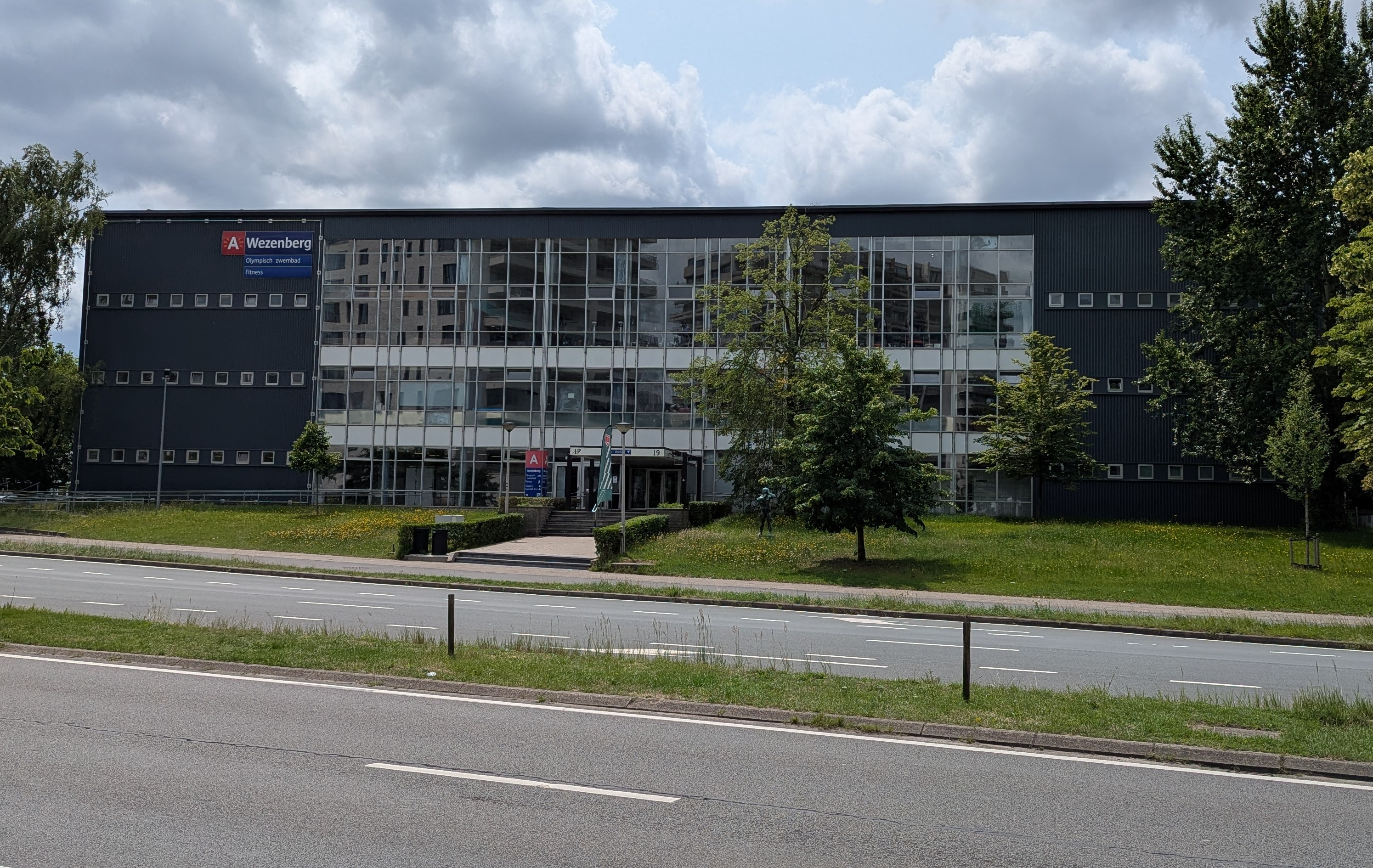
- Exterior view of the swimming center
- Interactive map of Wezenberg Olympic Swimming Center
- Location: Desguinlei 17–19, 2018 Antwerp, 2018
- Owner: City of Antwerp
- Operator: City of Antwerp
- Type: Olympic-size indoor swimming pool
- Facilities: Image and time registration equipment (Wezenberg 2)
- Dimensions: 7,500 m²; Length: 50 metres (164 ft); Width: 21 m (main), 16 m (Wezenberg 2); Depth: 2.2 m (Wezenberg 2)

Construction
- Opened: 1973
- Construction cost: €8 million (Wezenberg 2, 2015)

Website
- Official website

The Wezenberg Olympic Swimming Center (Dutch: Olympisch zwemcentrum Wezenberg) is a swimming center located on De Singel in Antwerp, Belgium. The main building was opened in 1973 and includes a 50-meter Olympic-size pool and a 20×17 meter instruction pool.

== History ==
An outdoor Olympic pool already existed at the site in 1920 and was used during the swimming events of the 1920 Summer Olympics.

In 1951, a new outdoor pool replaced the original one. The current indoor facility opened in 1973. From 2014 to 2015, a second 50-meter training pool—Wezenberg 2—was constructed just 8 meters from the original. This facility has six lanes and is not open to the public but is used for elite training and includes high-tech equipment for image and time registration. It measures 50.025 meters in length, 16 meters in width, and 2.2 meters in depth.

The €8 million project was funded by the City of Antwerp (€4.5M) and the Flemish government (€3.5M). Training began on October 1, 2015, and the official opening was held on November 27, 2015.

== Events and Usage ==
The center serves as the home of swimming club BRABO, which includes Olympians like Pieter Timmers and Kimberly Buys. It hosts annual provincial championships and the Antwerp International Youth Swimming Cup. The facility has also been the venue for multiple Belgian national championships, including the 2010 edition.

Wezenberg hosted the European Junior Swimming Championships in 1991, 1998, 2007, and 2012. In 2001, it also hosted the European Short Course Swimming Championships.

== Architecture and Renovation ==
The site covers 7,500 square meters and includes spectator seating for 800 people. Renovations occurred in 2001–2002, 2011, and 2015. During one of these refurbishments, Belgian cartoonist and visual artist Benoît van Innis contributed artwork for the wall tiles.
