= Swimming Olympic Centre of Bahia =

Swimming centre in Salvador, Bahia, Brazil

Coordinates: 12.979624°S 38.496160°W

The Swimming Olympic Centre of Bahia, also referred to as Aquatic Sports Centre of SUDESB, is a sports facility aimed for the practice of swimming in the city of Salvador, capital of the Bahia state in Brazil. The construction of the facility was completed in 2016. Its total area is 12.195,67 square metres, and consists of two Olympic swimming pools (50m and 25m), 500 seats, dressing rooms, a car park and other dependencies.

== See also ==
- Júlio Delamare Aquatics Centre
- Maria Lenk Aquatic Center
