= Maria Lenk Aquatics Centre =

Sports venue in Rio de Janeiro, Brazil

Coordinates: 22°58′28″S 43°23′16″W

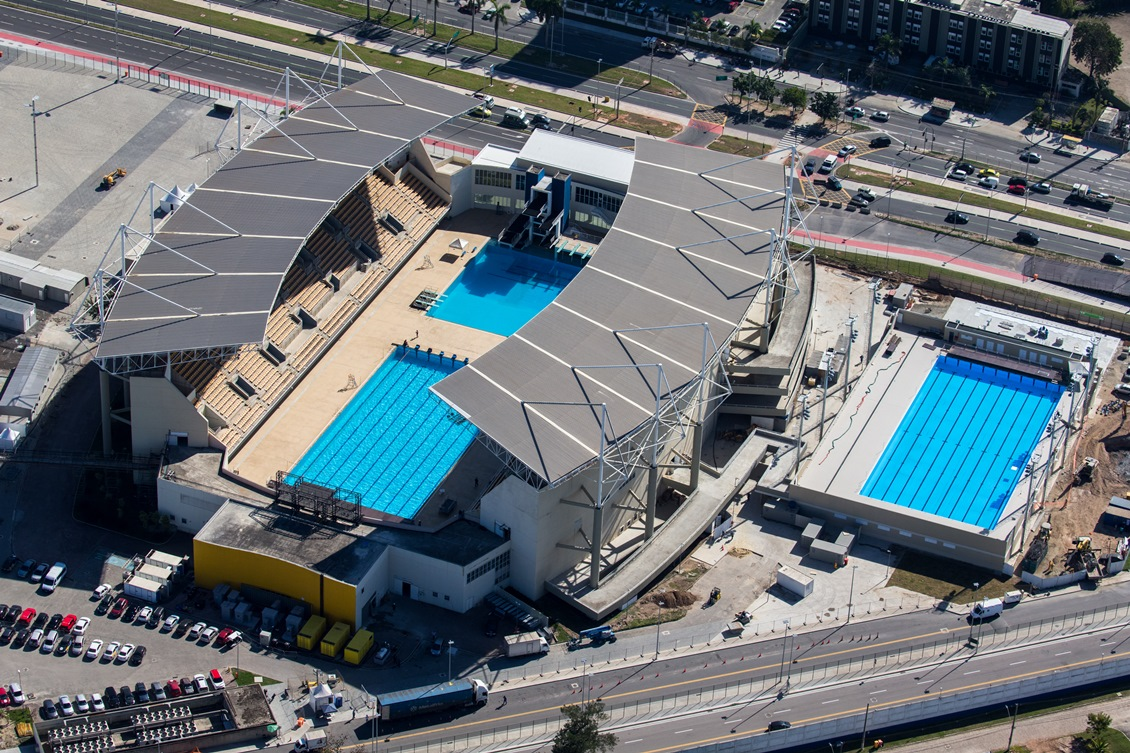
Aerial view of Maria Lenk Aquatic Center

The Maria Lenk Aquatics Centre (Portuguese: Parque Aquático Maria Lenk) is an aquatics centre that is part of the City of Sports Complex in the Barra da Tijuca district of Rio de Janeiro, Brazil. It is part of the investments made by the city to host the swimming, synchronized swimming and diving competitions of the 2007 Pan American Games. During the 2016 Summer Olympics, it hosted group matches of water polo and the synchronised swimming and diving competitions. The name of the water park is a tribute to the Brazilian swimmer, Maria Lenk, who died less than three months before its inauguration.

The water park was designed in accordance with established parameters and specifications of the International Swimming Federation (FINA). It is partially covered and includes an Olympic-sized swimming pool, an indoor heating and a tank for diving.

The complex has the capacity to receive about 8,000 people. The construction area is 42,000 square metres (450,000 ft^{2}). The facility has also been designed according to the specifications required to achieve the Parapan American Games of 2007, as well as environments and equipment ready to receive people with disabilities. The park, as well as other facilities built for the achievement of the Pan American Games, was one of the major assets of the city's bid for the 2016 Summer Olympics.

In March 2008, the facility came under the administration of the Brazilian Olympic Committee (COB), which has been involved in training for Olympic and Paralympic athletes, coaches and officials, as well as courses, conferences, workshops, gym and small schools of swimming, water polo, diving and synchronized swimming. Until 2009, the BOC did not do any sports activity on the site. In 2011, the facility received the Centro de Treinamento Time Brasil (Team Brazil Training Center), which comprises a gym, a laboratory, and a room for combat sports training, designed by judoka turned architect Daniela Polzin. In 2018, COB moved its headquarters onto the aquatics centre in a cost-cutting measure, while also planning to add two beach volleyball courts in the area to offer more services in the facility. It also started receiving the Brazil Swimming Trophy starting in 2017. In 2022, as COB moved into a building closer to the centre, it also renewed its concession of the Maria Lenk Aquatics Centre until 2048, while also planning to add an archery range nearby.

== Gallery ==
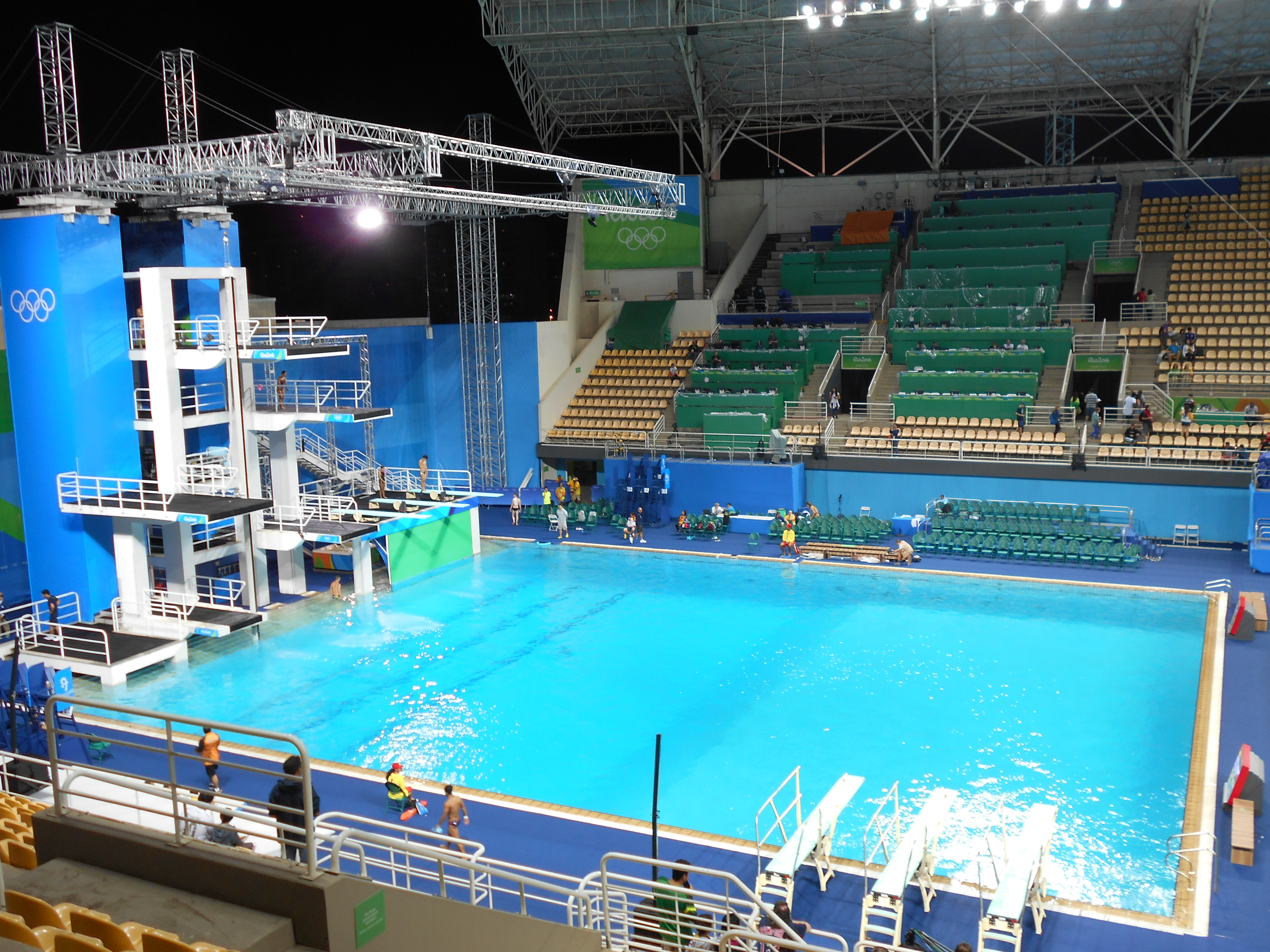
The diving tower during the 2016 Summer Olympics

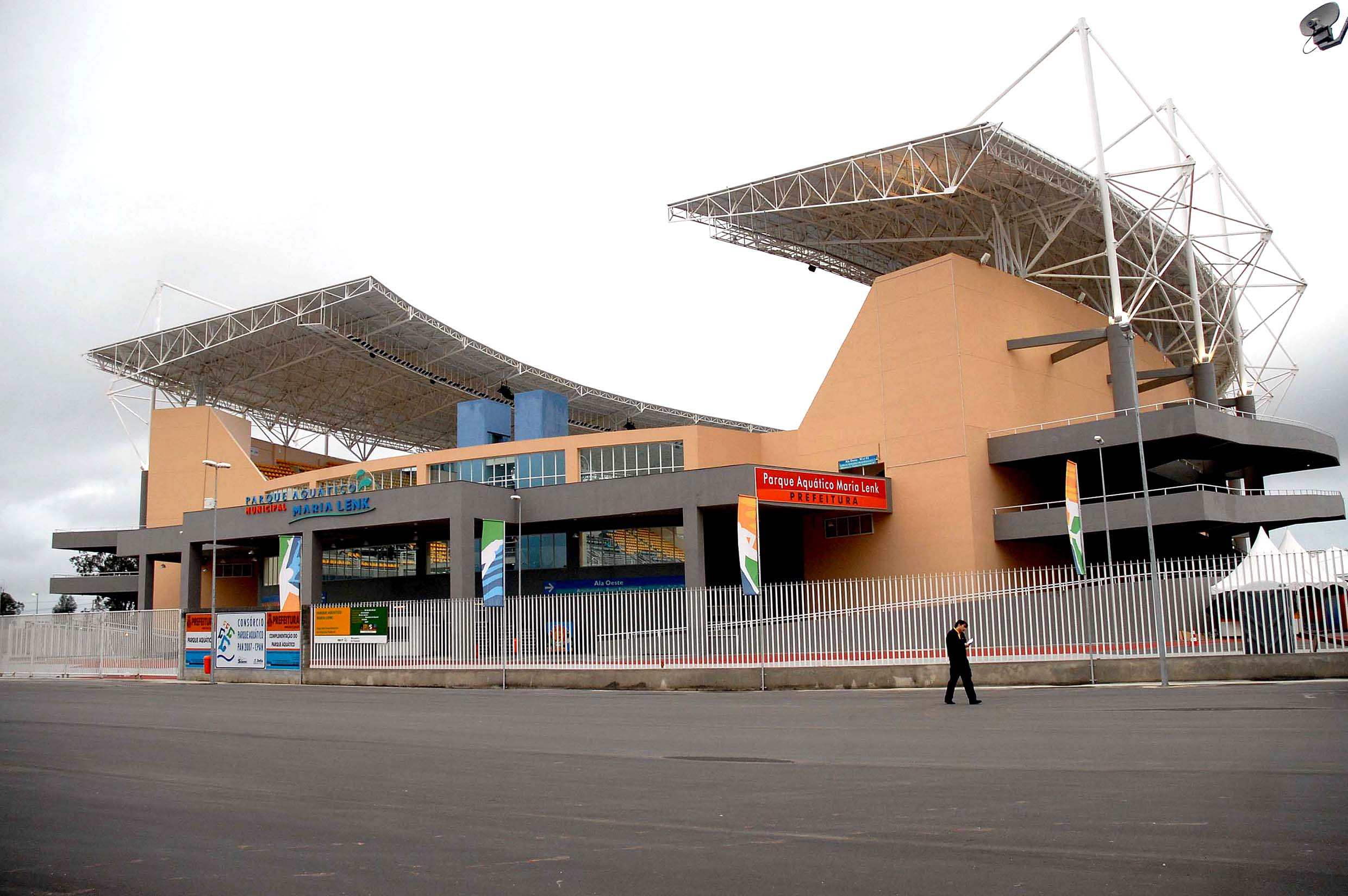
Outside the aquatics center during the 2007 Pan Am Games

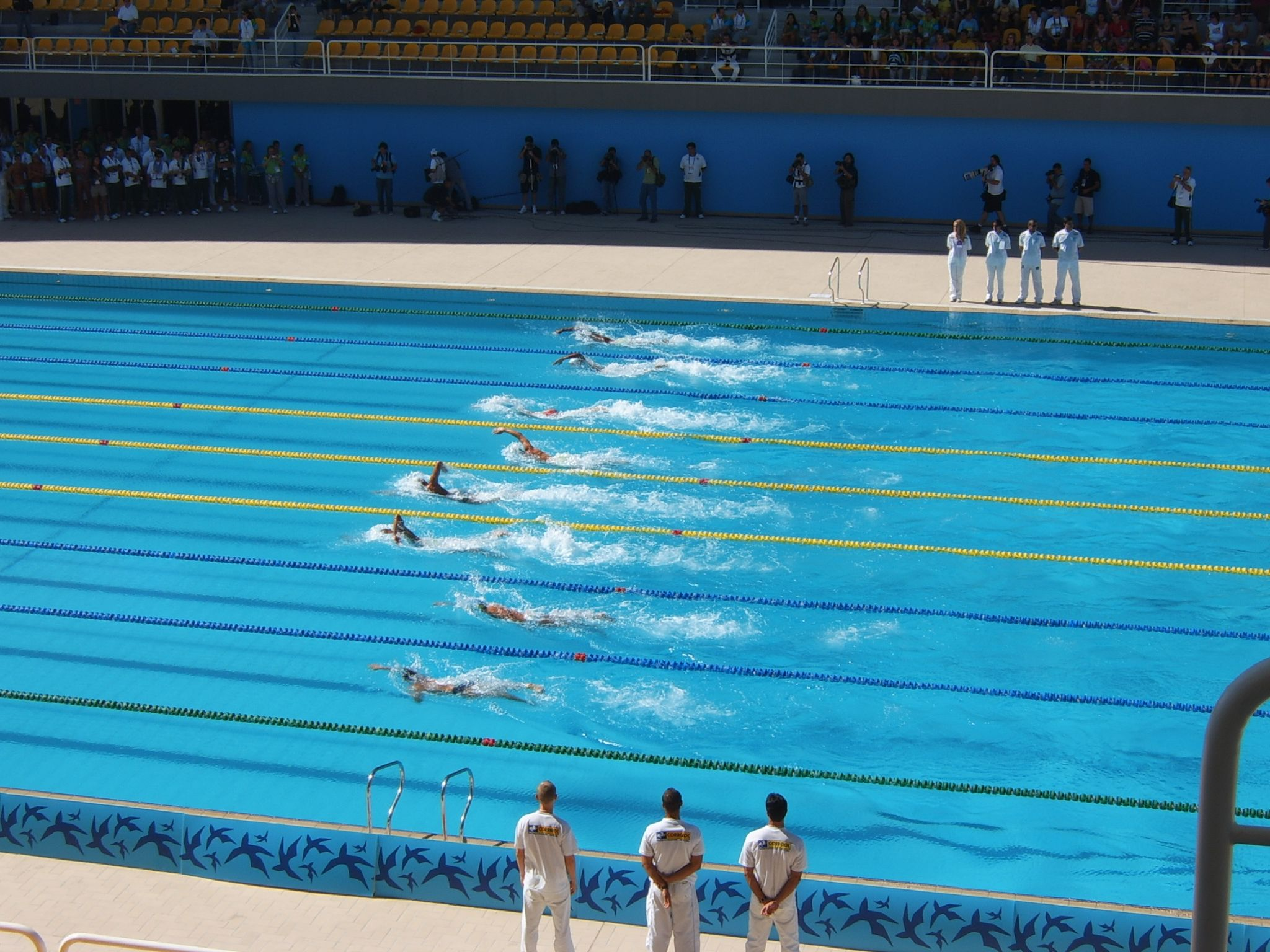
The competition pool

== See also ==
- Júlio Delamare Aquatics Centre
- Swimming Olympic Centre of Bahia
