= Oasen (swimming pool) =

Swimming venue in Namsos, Norway

Coordinates: 64°28′27″N 11°31′18″E

Oasen is a public swimming pool built inside a rock cavern in Namsos, Norway. It is one of four Olympic-size swimming pools in Norway, featuring a 50-metre pool. It opened in 1988.
