= San Alfonso del Mar =

Private resort in Algarrobo, Chile

Coordinates: 33°21′S 71°39.2′W

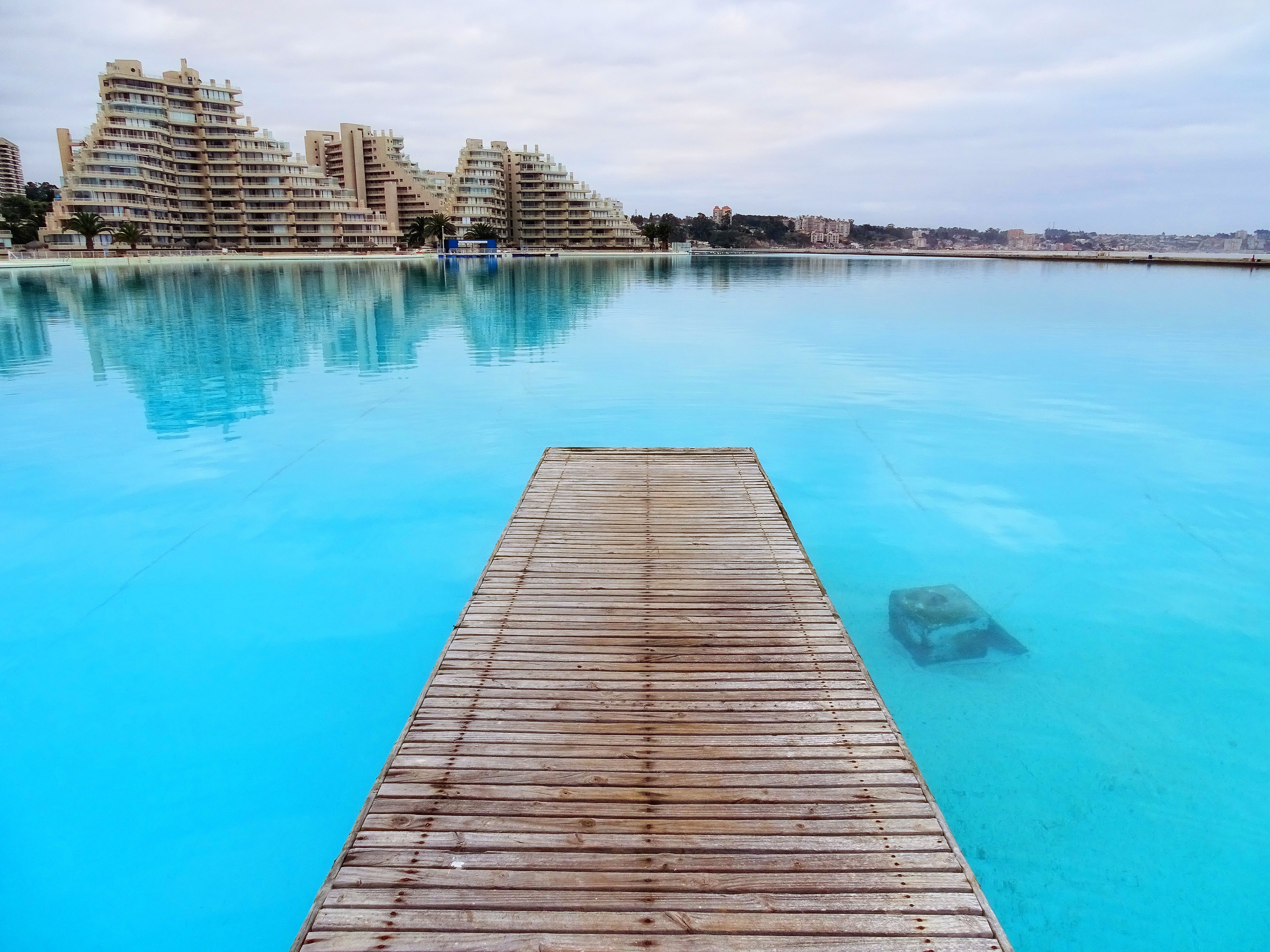
The swimming pool at San Alfonso del Mar from ground level

San Alfonso del Mar, sometimes spelled "San Alphonso del Mar", is a private resort in Algarrobo, Chile, about 100 km (62 mi) west of Santiago.

== Facilities ==
- 1,200 second home units.
- Sub-Acqua Café Aquarium, located on the edge of the artificial lagoon.
- Beach Club, consisting of a gym, spa, shop, kiosk-bar, outdoor jacuzzis, and a heated swimming pool covered by a glass pyramid.
- Nightclub, an underground building on the side of a hill with a sunken dance floor, bar, and DJ.
- Fragata Building, a pyramid-shaped building with 141 apartments.
- Bitácora Building, with a total of 60 apartments.

=== Artificial lagoon ===
The resort has one of the world's largest swimming pools. At the time of its completion in 2006, it was in the Guinness Book of World Records for the largest pool in the world by area.

The pool is 1,013 m (3,323 ft) long, covering 8.2 ha (20 acres), containing some 250 million litres (66 million US gallons) of seawater, with a maximum depth of 11.5 feet. The water is pumped from the adjacent Pacific Ocean, then filtered and treated. Access to the pool is limited to resort residents only.

Crystal Lagoons, a company created by Fernando Fischmann in addition to Inmobiliaria El Plomo and the lead architects Marques + Garcés & Asociados Arquitectos, developed the lagoon.

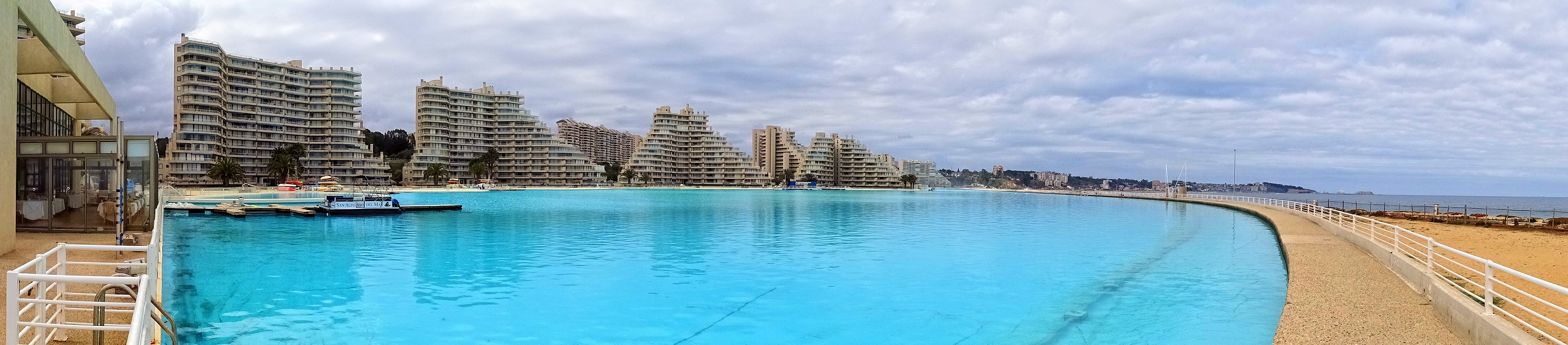
