= Deep Dive Dubai =

Deep swimming pool in Dubai

- Interactive map of Deep Dive Dubai
- Location: Dubai, United Arab Emirates
- Coordinates: 25.1278°N 55.2951°E
- Pool size: 60 metres (200 ft) deep

Construction
- Opened: 28 July 2021

Website
- deepdivedubai.com

Deep Dive Dubai is a 60-metre (200 ft) deep diving pool in Dubai. Containing 14,000,000 liters (3,100,000 imp gal; 3,700,000 U.S. gal) of fresh water, it is the deepest swimming pool in the world. The structure has an area designed to resemble a ruined, sunken city, with walls, furnished rooms and a sunken car, motorbikes, snooker table, foosball table and more which can also be used as an underwater film studio. Prior to the venue's opening in July 2021, the world's deepest swimming pool was the Deepspot pool and scuba diving training center in Mszczonów.

The tank is designed in the shape of an oyster, reflecting Dubai's heritage of pearl diving. The corners of the tank are covered by 56 cameras and a comprehensive set of audio and lighting equipment.

== See also ==
- Nemo 33 (34.5 metres (113 ft) deep pool)
- Blue Abyss
- Deepspot (45 metres (148 ft) deep pool)
- Y-40 (42.15 metres (138.3 ft) deep pool)
