= Tøyenbadet =

Swimming venue in Oslo, Norway

Coordinates: 59°55′10″N 10°46′44″E

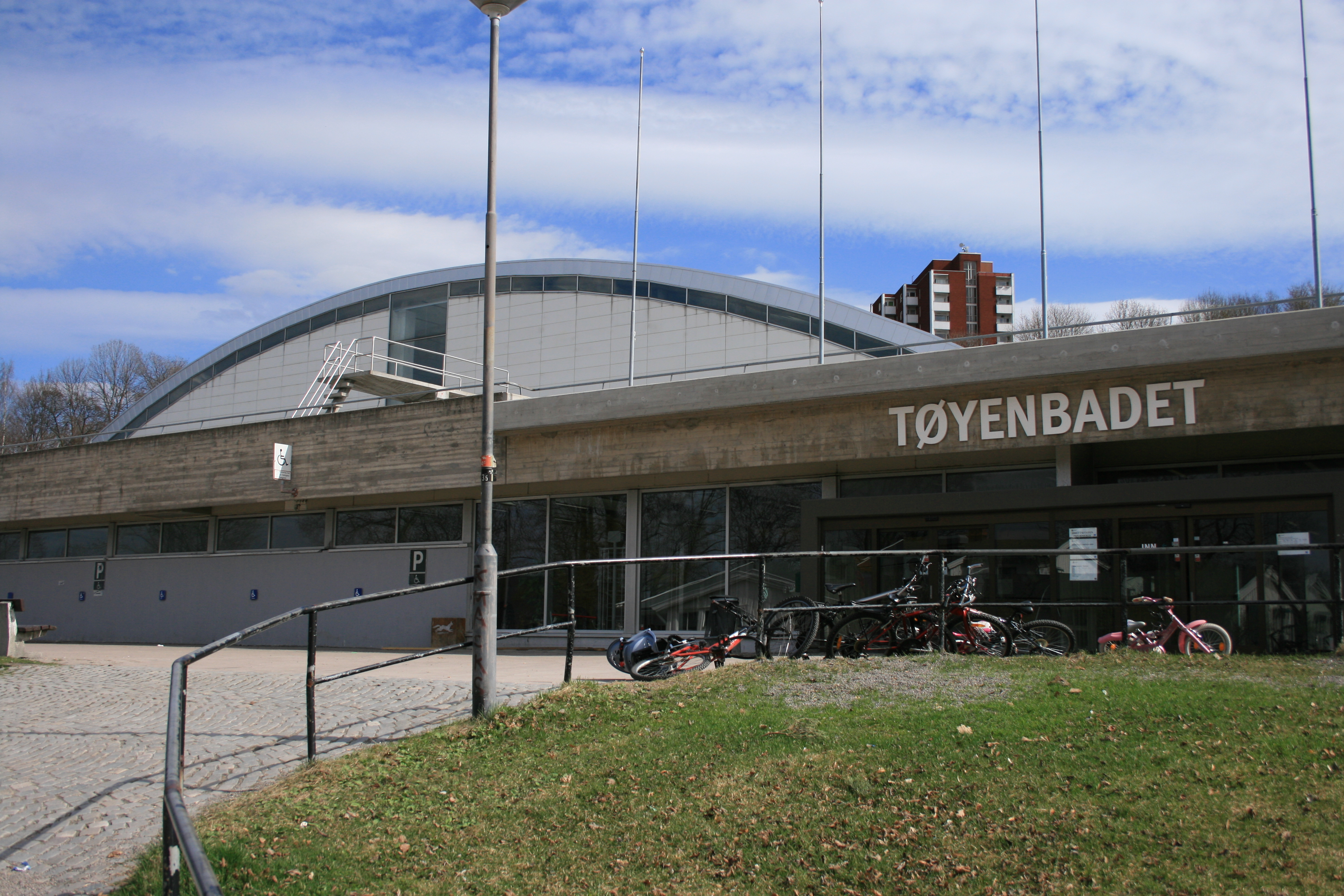
Tøyenbadet

Tøyenbadet is an indoor swimming facility in Oslo, Norway. It is the biggest swimming pool facility in the country. Situated in Helgesens Gate 90,the original building designed by architect Gert Walter Thuesen was built in 1976 and contained indoor and outdoor swimming pools. It was closed for refurbishment in spring 2007 and re-opened in autumn 2008; six months later than planned. Within months of this refurbishment, the facility was experiencing water leakage problems.

Due to persistent maintenance and structural problems, the facility closed permanently in January 2020, to be entirely demolished and rebuilt. It re-opened on Jan. 1st, 2025.
