= Montegrotto Terme =

Montegrotto Terme Montegròto
- Comune
- Comune di Montegrotto Terme
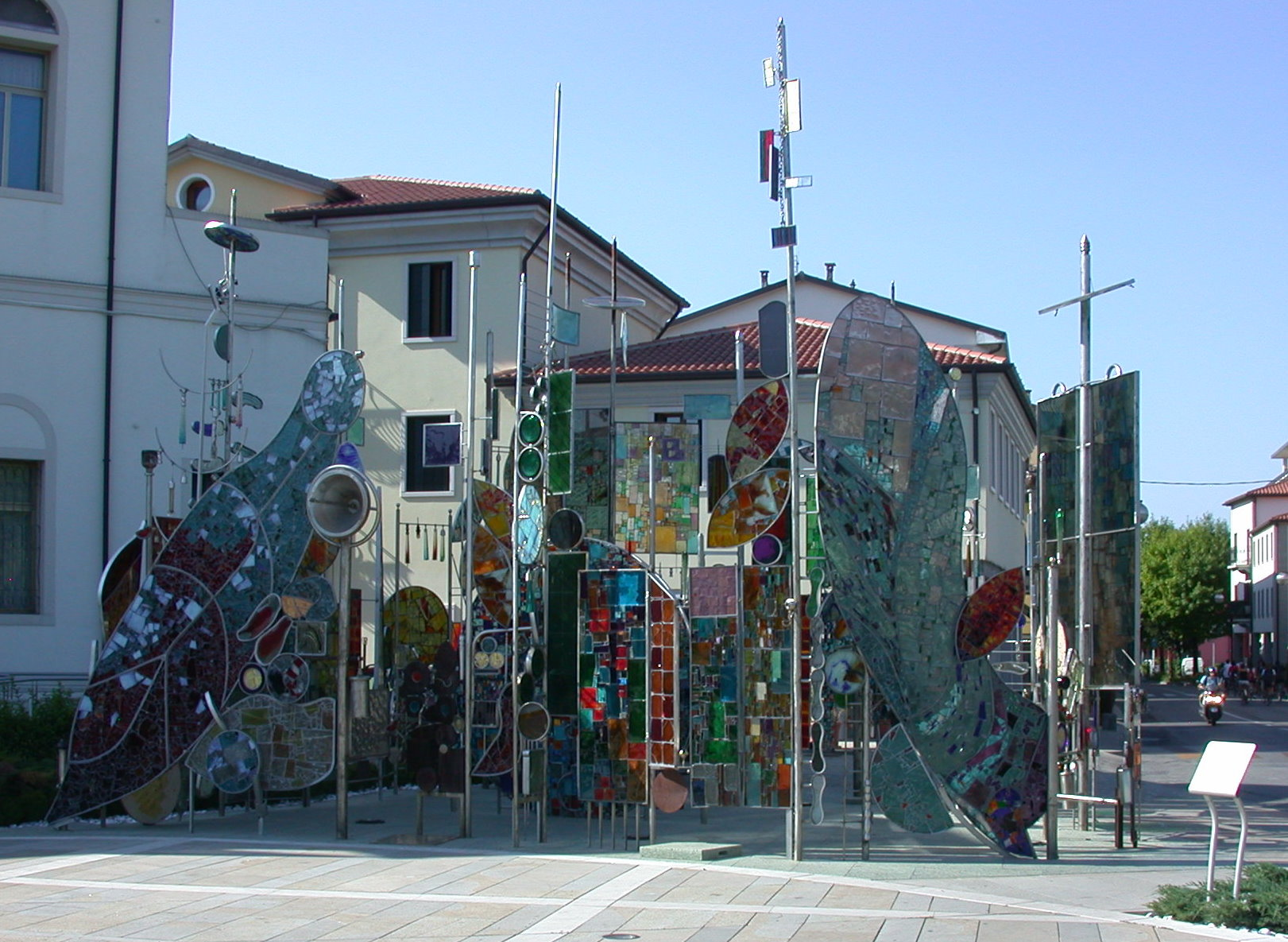

- Coat of arms

- Location within Italy Location within Veneto
- Coordinates: 45°20′N 11°47′E
- Country: Italy
- Region: Veneto
- Province: Padua (PD)
- Frazioni: Mezzavia, Turri

Government
  - Mayor: Riccardo Mortandello

Area
  - Total: 15.2 km^{2} (5.9 sq mi)
- Elevation: 11 m (36 ft)

Population (2007)
  - Total: 10,886
  - Density: 716/km^{2} (1,850/sq mi)
- Time zone: UTC+1 (CET)
  - Summer (DST): UTC+2 (CEST)
- Postal code: 35036
- Dialing code: 049
- Website: Official website

Montegrotto Terme (Venetian: Montegròto) is a comune (municipality) in the Province of Padua in the Italian region Veneto, located about 45 kilometres (28 mi) west of Venice and about 11 kilometres (7 mi) southwest of Padua.

Montegrotto Terme is a spa resort, part of the Terme Euganee spas. The Euganean Hills (Colli Euganei) are located nearby.

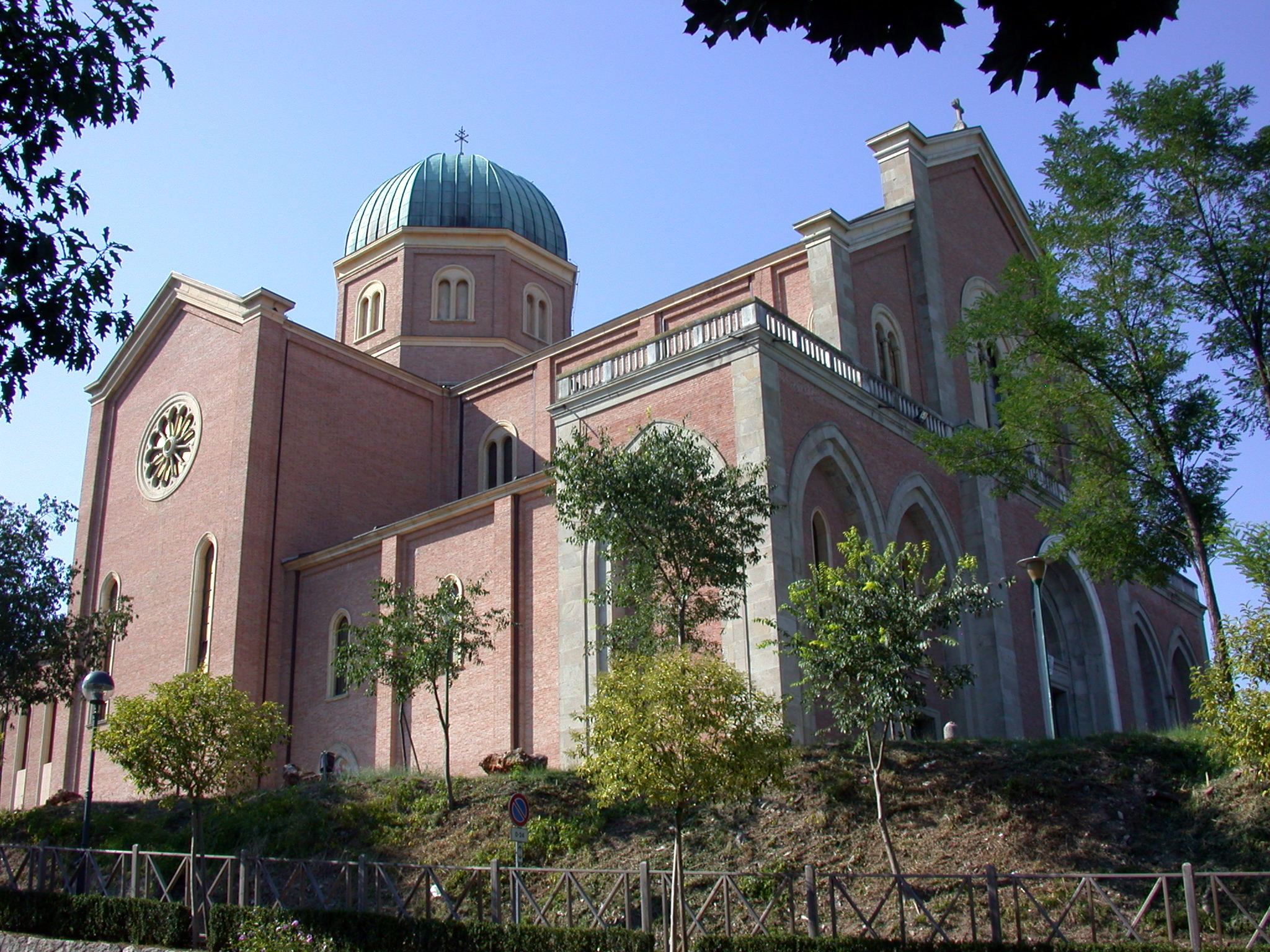
Cathedral of Montegrotto

The town's most famous landmark, visible from afar, is the Cathedral San Pietro, called Duomo, on the hill between the town hall and the railway station. It is a post WW-II brickstone building and was consecrated in 1963. The two huge frescos are by a local artist, Armando Migliolaro (1915-1999). The left fresco, Patrimonium Petri, has the following Latin legend: In sapientia sermonis sui (instead of: eius) mirati sunt universi. This should mean: Everyone admired the wisdom of his speech. The possessive pronoun ""sui"" being reflexive, however, the artist made a serious mistake and the legend actually means: Everyone admired the wisdom of his own sermon. The syntactical error has not been noticed by churchgoers and church officials because ""sui"" sounds normal in Italian.

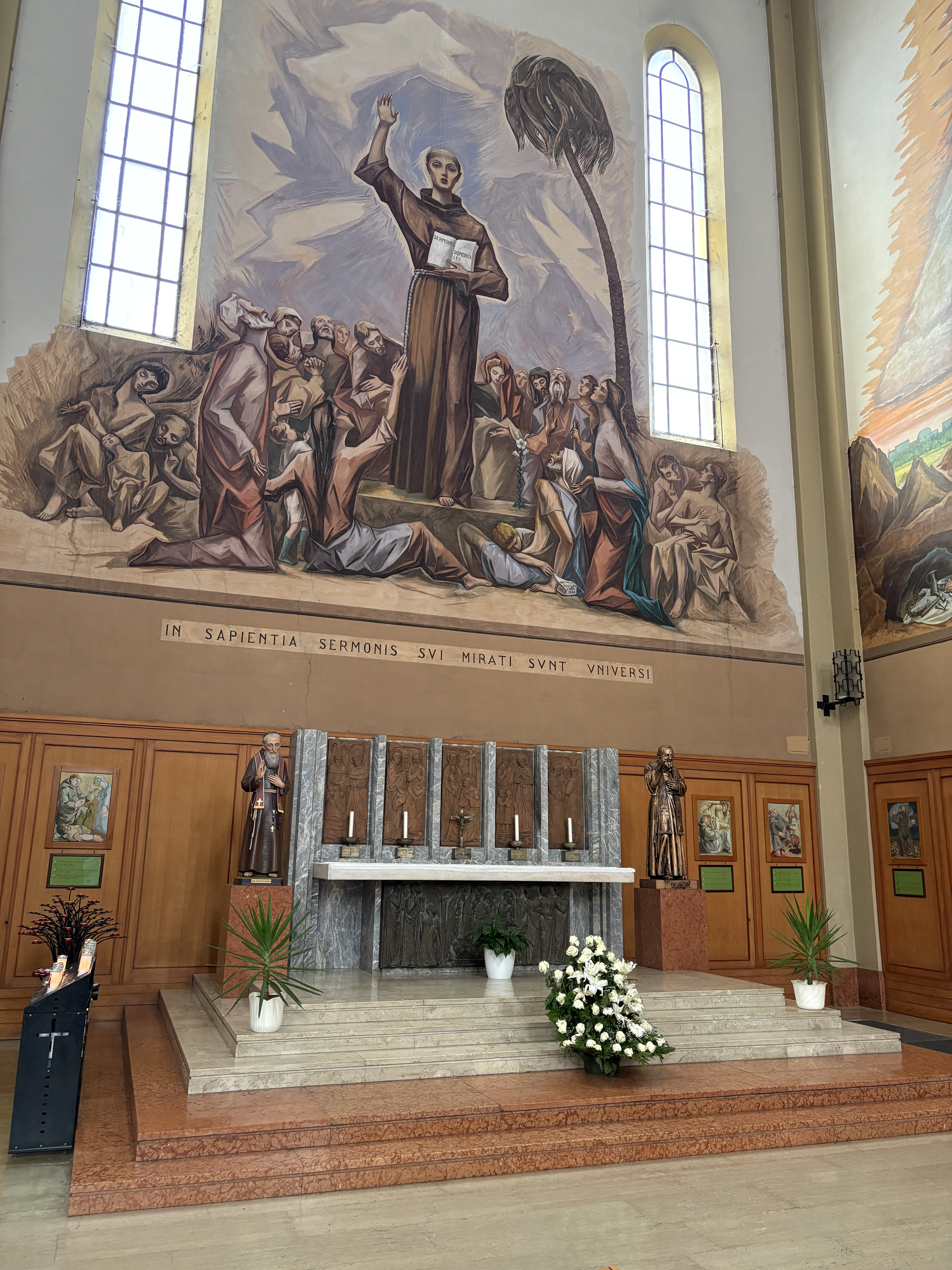
Latin blunder in the legend of the fresco Patrimonium Petri

The etymology of the town's name is commonly explained as Mons Aegrotorum, Hill of the sick, which is, however, unlikely because until 1934 the village or the houses in what was to become Montegrotto were not called Montegrotto until 1934 and the area belonged to Battaglia. In the Middle Ages the place was called San Pietro Montagnone, probably after the family Montagnone, so the name Montegrotto was never used by Latin speaking people.

Montegrotto Terme borders the following municipalities: Abano Terme, Battaglia Terme, Due Carrare, Galzignano Terme, Torreglia.

The Hotel Terme Millepini, which is a Guinness World Record holder for containing the world's deepest pool is located in Montegrotto Terme.

== International relations ==
=== Twin towns – Sister cities ===
Montegrotto Terme is twinned with:

- Alajuela, Costa Rica, since 2005
- Baile Herculane, Romania, since 2004
- Berettyoujfalu, Hungary
- Bordano, Italy
- (United States) Mason City, Iowa, USA, since 2004
- Mostar, Bosnia and Herzegovina, since 2000
- Río Hondo, Argentina, since 2005
