= Fleishhacker =

== Surname ==
Fleishhacker is an American surname of German origin. Notable people with the surname include:

- Aaron Fleishhacker (1820–1989), German-born American businessman
- Herbert Fleishhacker (1872–1957), American businessman, civic leader and philanthropist

== Places ==
- Mortimer Fleishhacker House in Woodside, California
- Fleishhacker Pool in San Francisco, California
- San Francisco Zoo, originally known as Fleishhacker Zoo

== See also ==
- Fleischhacker
