= List of diving facilities =

This is a list of diving facilities, especially those including 10-meter diving platforms. This is usually the last feature of an athletics complex required for training and competition in the full program of Olympic swimming and diving. In the United States, a 10-meter platform is required for full NCAA competition, although two schools may hold a dual NCAA meet at a facility lacking one if both schools agree. Organizations that set standards for diving facilities include FINA which governs international competitions, and, in the United States, NFHS, NCAA, and USA Swimming. A typical requirement for indoor facilities is that they must provide 5 metres (16 ft) clearance above the highest diving board or platform, so that divers do not hit a ceiling structure.

Modern diving facilities developed from earlier swimming and diving venues, and men's 10-meter platform competition is listed as part of the sport's Olympic debut in 1904.

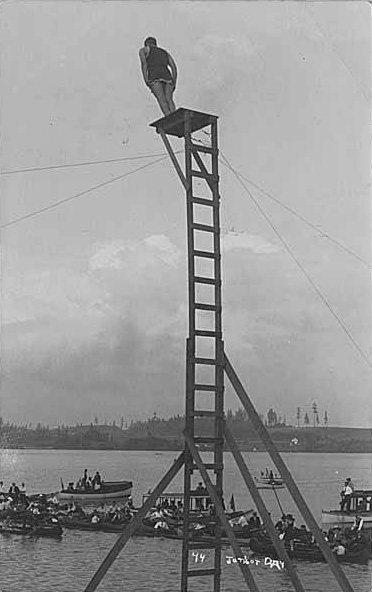
University of Washington, 1915

Training for Olympic diving competition requires 10-meter diving facilities, which are scant in some parts of the world. For example, the Walter Schroeder Aquatic Center, built in 1979 as a YMCA facility, is one of only two Olympic-sized pools in Wisconsin that can host large events, and it is the only facility in the southeast Wisconsin region with 10-meter diving platforms.

== Australia ==
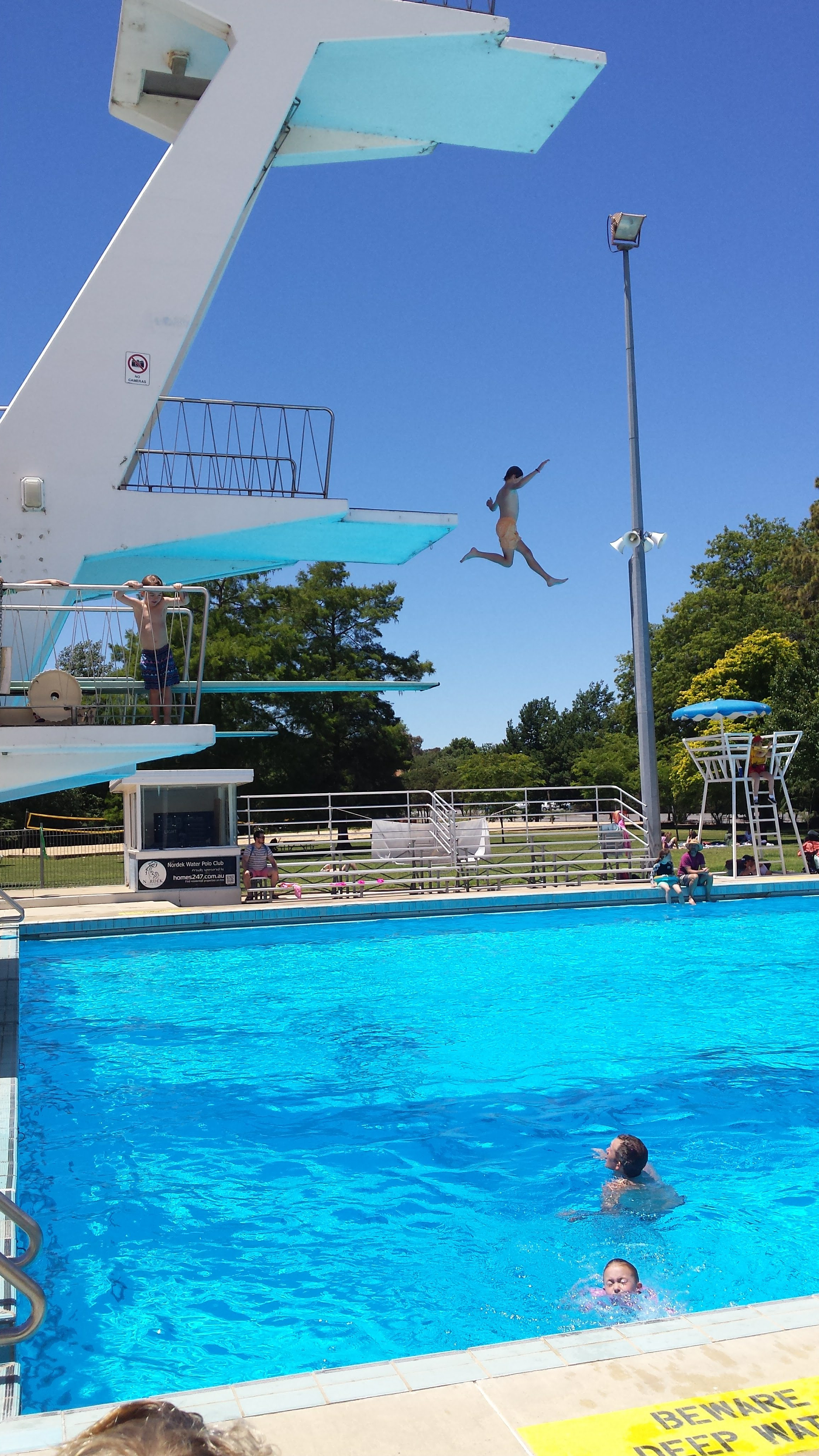
Canberra Civic Pool

- Canberra Olympic Pool: Constructed in 1955 in the lead-up to the 1956 Melbourne Olympic Games, the facility includes a 10-metre cantilevered reinforced-concrete diving tower.
- Sydney Olympic Park Aquatic Centre: host to the 2000 Olympic Games diving events and provides an ongoing venue for diving competitions with diving towers and springboards. See Diving at the 2000 Summer Olympics.
- Adelaide Aquatic Centre: Built in 1969 houses an international standard diving tower and springboards on a purpose-built diving pool.

== Austria ==
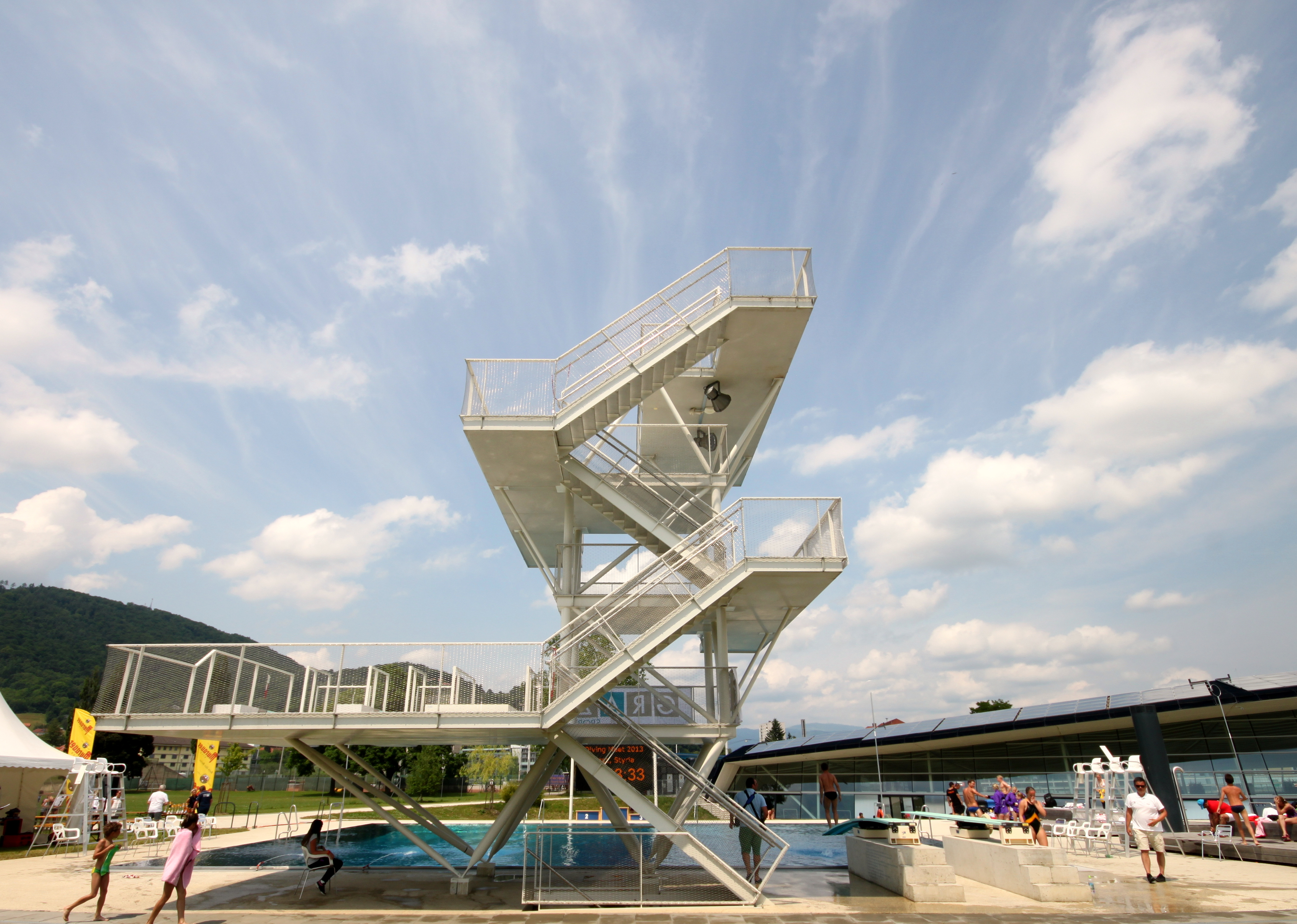
Auster Wellnessbad

- Auster Wellnessbad / Graz Eggenberg, Graz, Austria

== Brazil ==
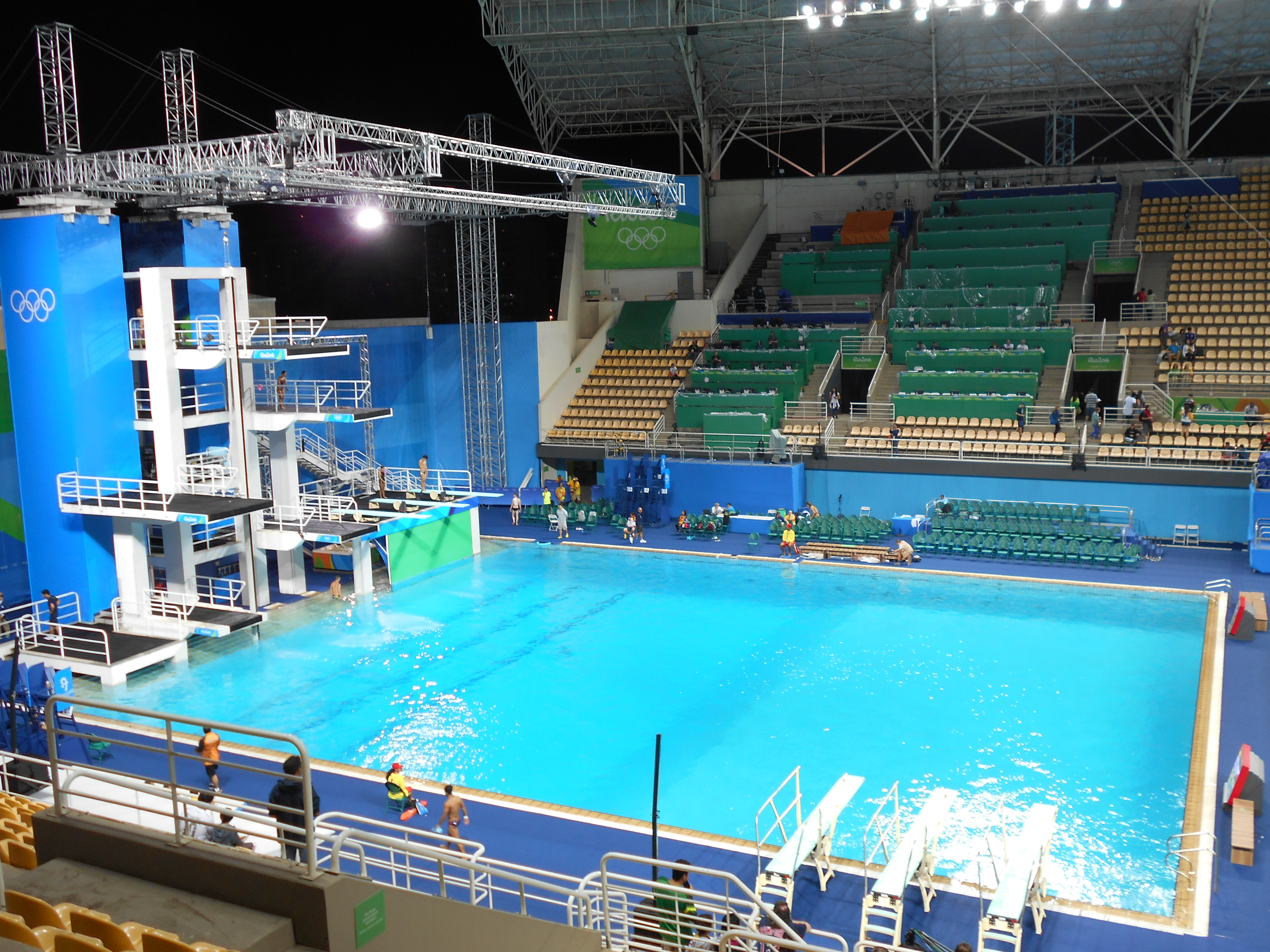
Centro Aquático Maria Lenk

- Centro Aquático Maria Lenk (built 2007), host of diving events of 2007 Pan American Games and of 2016 Summer Olympics. Now part of the Rio de Janeiro Olympic Park.

== Canada ==
- Bassin de plongeon, at the Montreal Olympic Pool (Olympic Park Sports Centre; Centre sportif du Parc Olympique), Montreal, Quebec, Canada. Indoor venue with a dedicated diving pool measuring 20.7 m × 20 m with a depth of 4.8–5.2 m. Equipped with two 1 m springboards and two 3 m springboards, and platforms at 3 m, 5 m, 7.5 m and 10 m. Venue statistics list 13 springboards in total (11 flexible, 2 fixed) and four platforms of varying heights. Built for the 1976 Summer Olympics and in continuous use since 1976. The centre reopened on 25 May 2015 after an 18-month refurbishment to modernise the 1976 facilities. World Aquatics notes the 2015 renovation brought the centre into compliance with international standards. The centre also supports indoor high diving with platforms at 20 m, 18 m and 15 m. The centre continues to host elite events, including the World Aquatics Diving World Cup – Montreal (26 February–1 March 2026).

== China ==
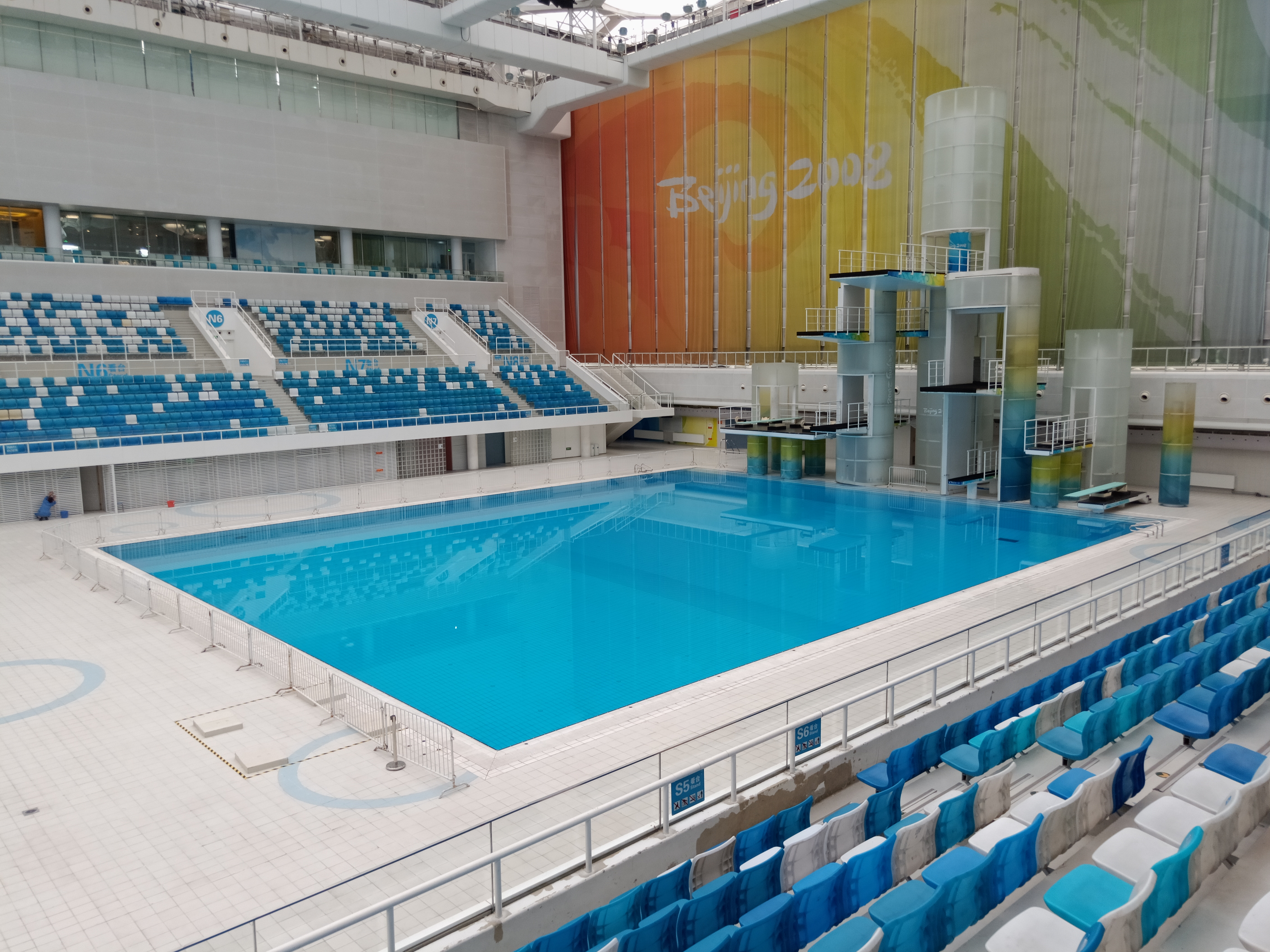
- The diving pool at the Water Cube
  Diving pool, at the Beijing National Aquatics Center (Water Cube), Olympic Green, Chaoyang District, Beijing, China. Indoor venue with a dedicated diving pool measuring 25 m × 30 m with a depth of 4.5–5.5 m. Equipped with one 1 m springboard and three 3 m springboards, and platforms at 1 m, 5 m, 7.5 m and 10 m; only the 5 m and 10 m platforms are wide enough to be used for synchronised dives. Designed and built by a consortium of PTW Architects, Arup, CSCEC and CCDI; construction began on 24 December 2003 and the centre was completed on 28 January 2008. Built for the 2008 Summer Olympics, where it hosted the diving competitions. The venue has hosted multiple editions of the World Aquatics Diving World Cup, including the Super Finals on 2–4 May 2025 and 1–3 May 2026.

== Croatia ==
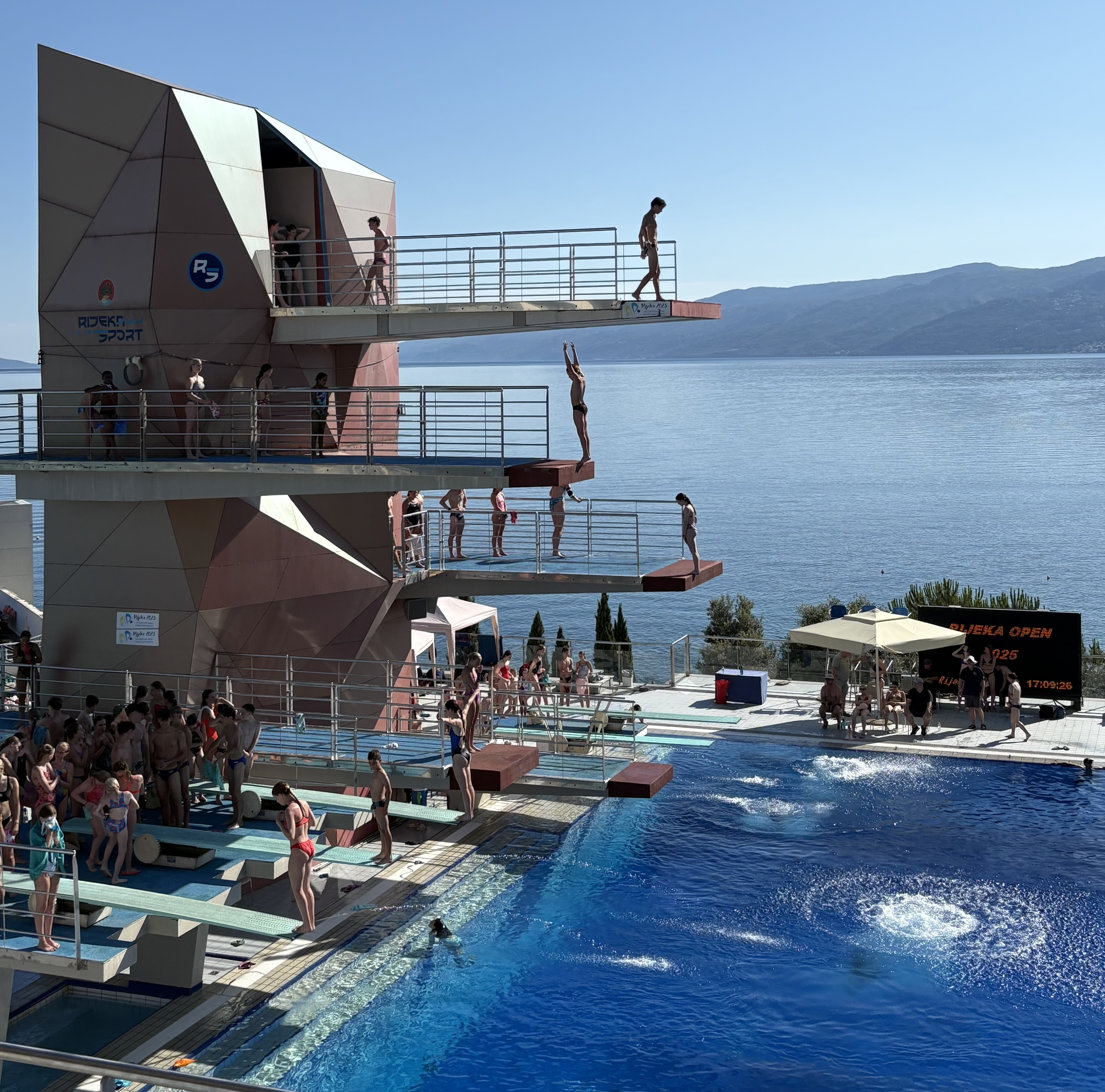
Kantrida Diving Well

- The Kantrida Diving Well, part of the Kantrida Swimming Pool Complex in Rijeka, features a 20 x 25 x 5M diving pool with 10M, 7.5M, 5M, and 3M platforms, as well as 1M (one fixed, three removable) and 3M (three fixed) springboards, all compliant with FINA standards. Opened in 2011, this seafront outdoor venue has a summer spectator capacity of 378 and regularly hosts international diving competitions.

== France ==
- Piscine des Tourelles, Paris, aquatics venue for the 1924 Summer Olympics.
- Paris Aquatic Centre in Saint-Denis hosted diving at the 2024 Summer Olympics and has a 10-meter platform.

== Germany ==
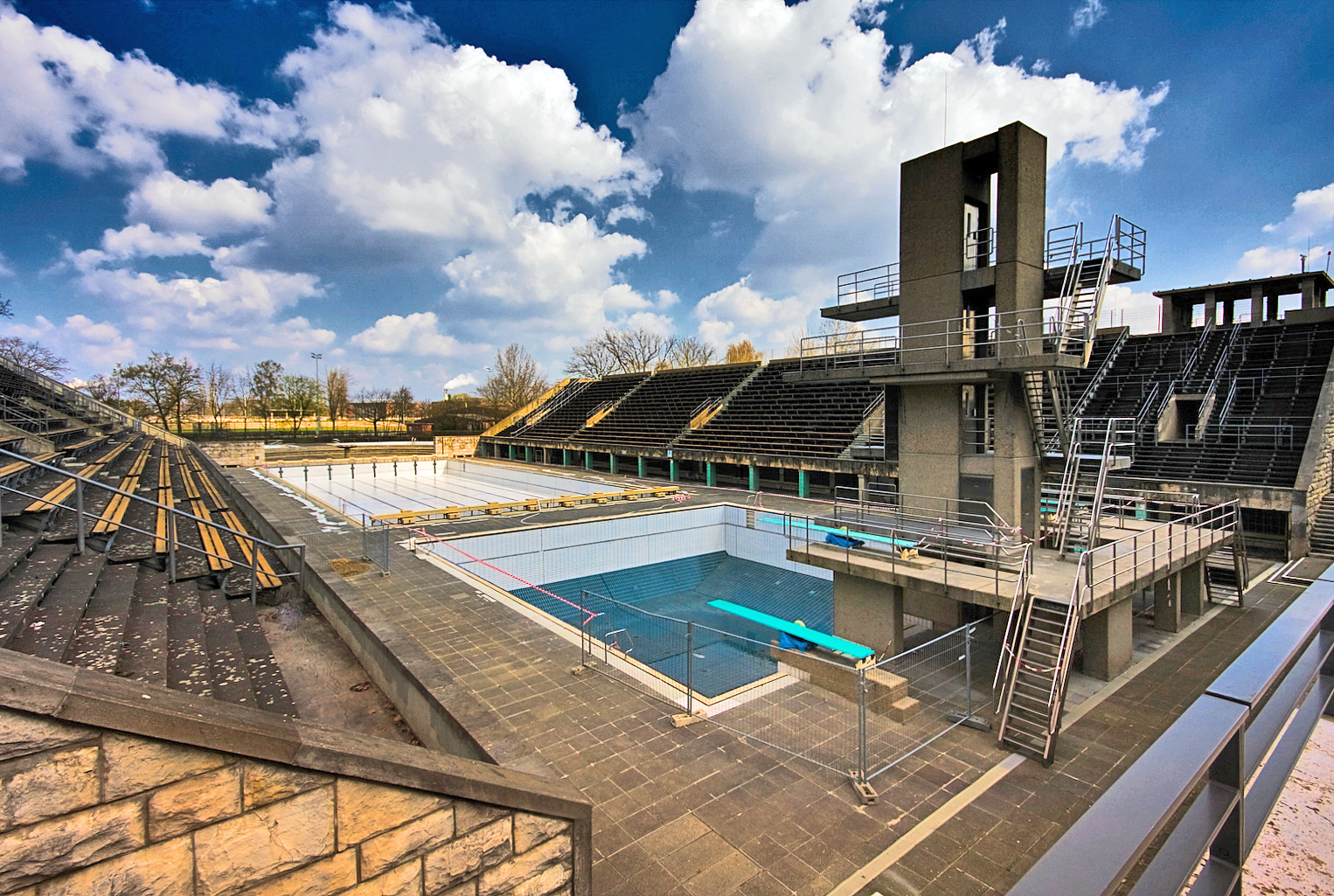
Olympic Swimming Stadium in Berlin

- Olympic Swimming Stadium, Berlin, which hosted the 1936 Summer Olympics's swimming and diving competitions.
- Olympia Schwimmhalle in Munich hosted diving at the 1972 Summer Olympics and has a 10-meter diving tower.

Platform	Image	Facility	Location	Note
10 meter platform		Schwanseebad	Weimar	
			Bünde	
5 meter platform in Rheingau			Rheingau	
			Berlin	
			Magdeburg	
10 meter platform		Delfinoh Freibad	Nordhorn	
10 meter platform		Ulla-Klinger-Halle ("Westhalle")	Aachen	

== Greece ==
- Athens Olympic Aquatic Centre, Marousi — the indoor diving pool hosted diving at the 2004 Summer Olympics and has a 10-meter platform.

== Hungary ==
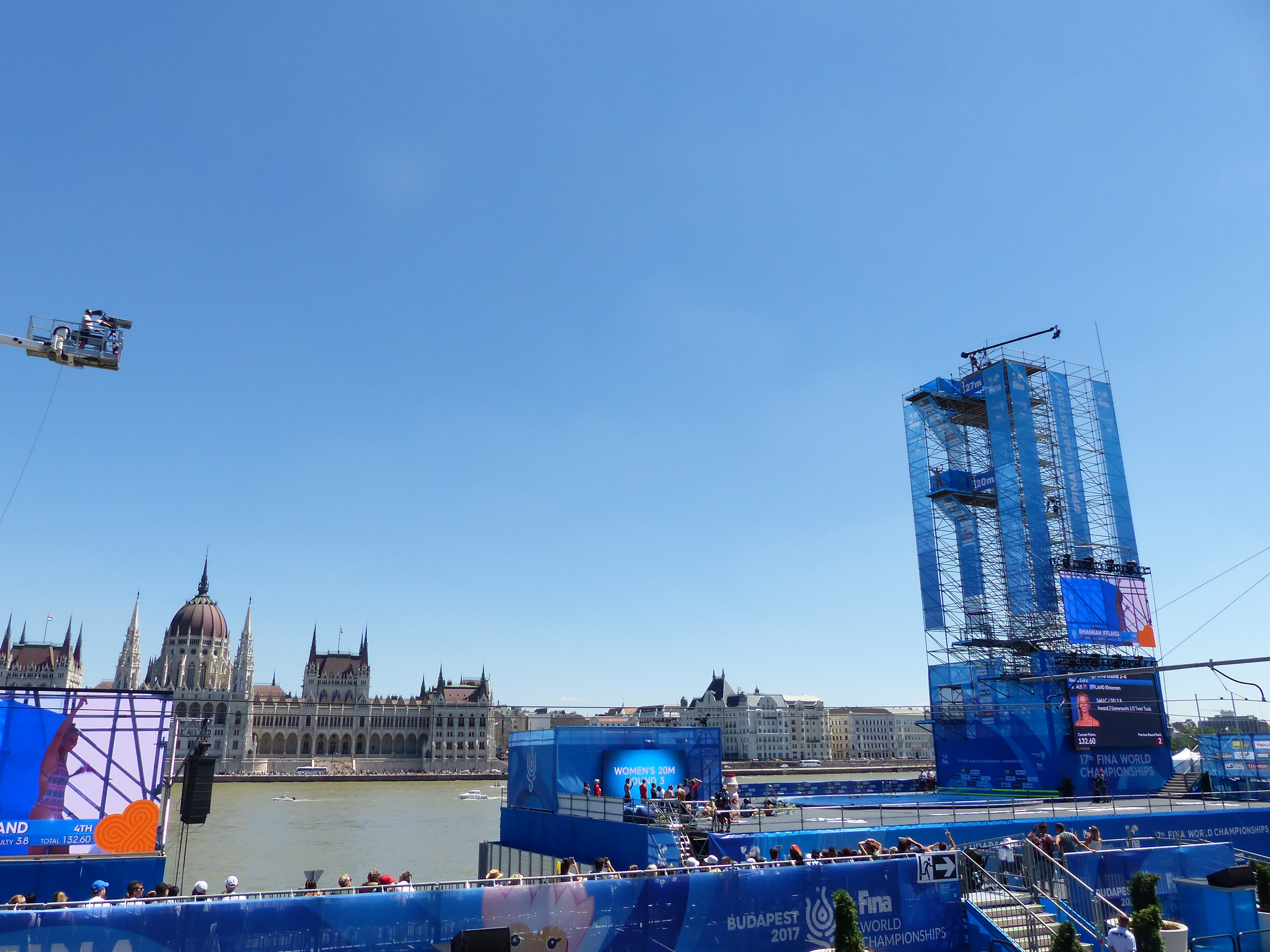
High diving platform in Budapest

- High diving facility in Budapest
- Alfréd Hajós National Swimming Stadium, Budapest
- Danube Arena, Budapest
- Debrecen Swimming Pool Complex, Debrecen

== India ==
- Diving pool at Mahatma Gandhi Swimming Pool, Dadar West, Mumbai, is a separate 25 by 21 metres (82 ft × 69 ft) diving pool with 1m and 3m boards, 5m, 7.5m and 10m platforms.

== Japan ==
- Tokyo Aquatics Centre in Tokyo hosted diving at the 2020 Summer Olympics and has a 10-meter platform.

== Monaco ==
- Rainier III Nautical Stadium, whose saltwater Olympic-size swimming pool has 1, 3, 5, and 10m diving platforms.

== Netherlands ==
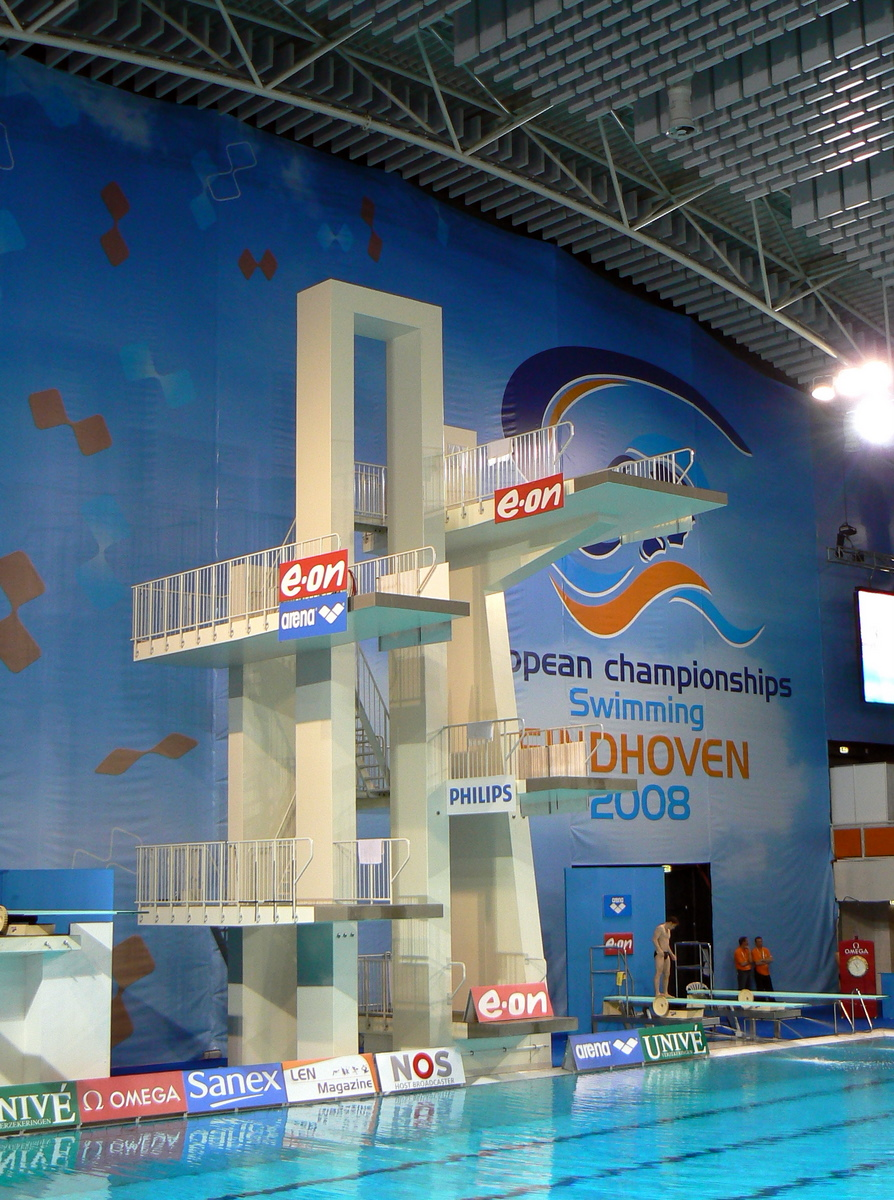
Eindhoven

- Eindhoven, host of diving events at the 2008 European Aquatics Championships.
- Olympic Sports Park Swim Stadium, Amsterdam, aquatics venue for 1928 Summer Olympics, demolished following the Olympics in 1929.

== New Zealand ==
- West Wave Pool and Leisure Centre – Henderson, Auckland. Indoor venue with a diving pool equipped with two 1 m and two 3 m springboards, and a tower with 5 m, 7.5 m, and 10 m platforms. The centre hosted the swimming and diving competitions at the 1990 Commonwealth Games.

== Norway ==
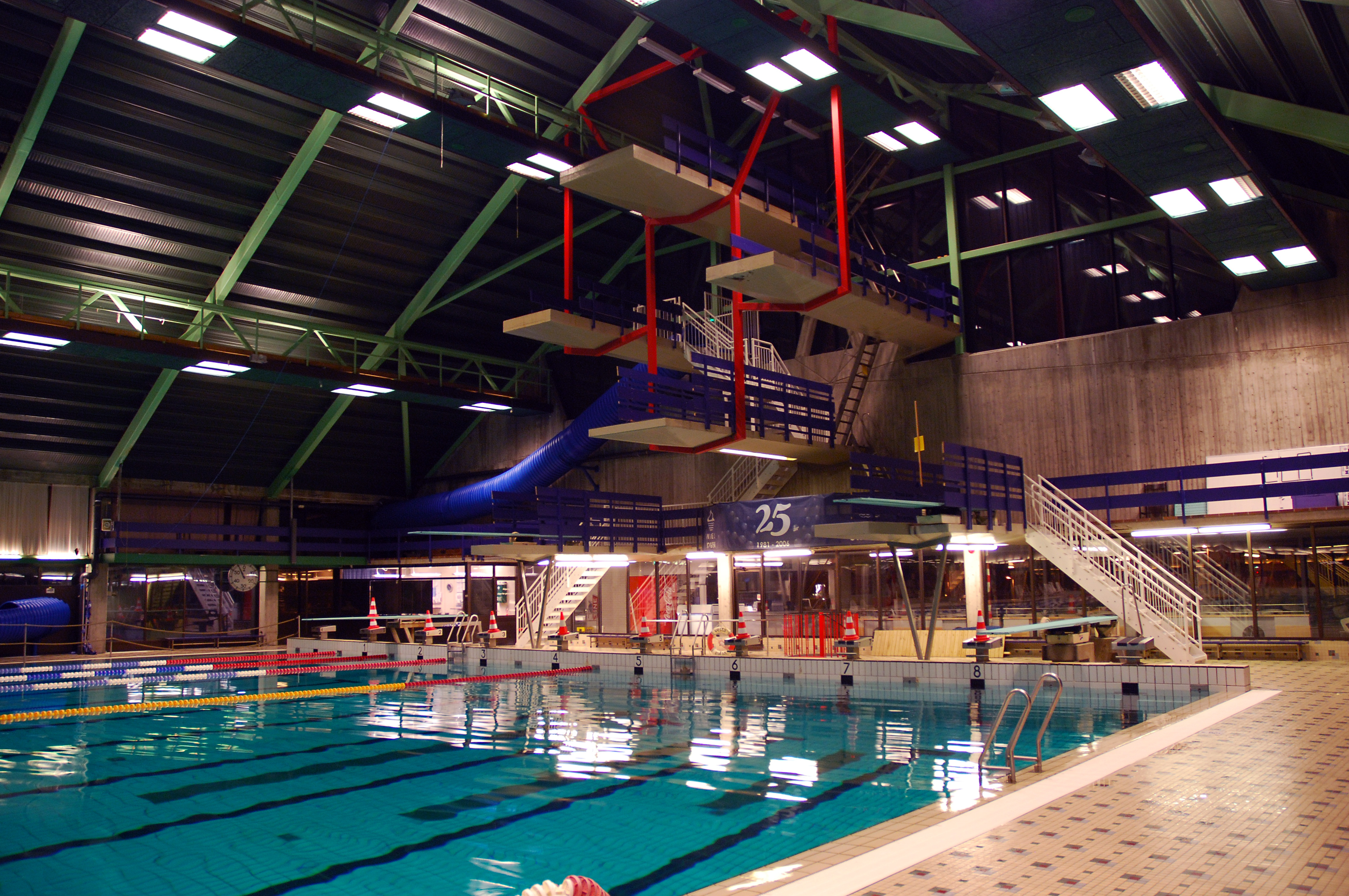
Hamar

- Ankerskogen svømmehall, in Hamar, Hedmark
- Oslo

== Sweden ==
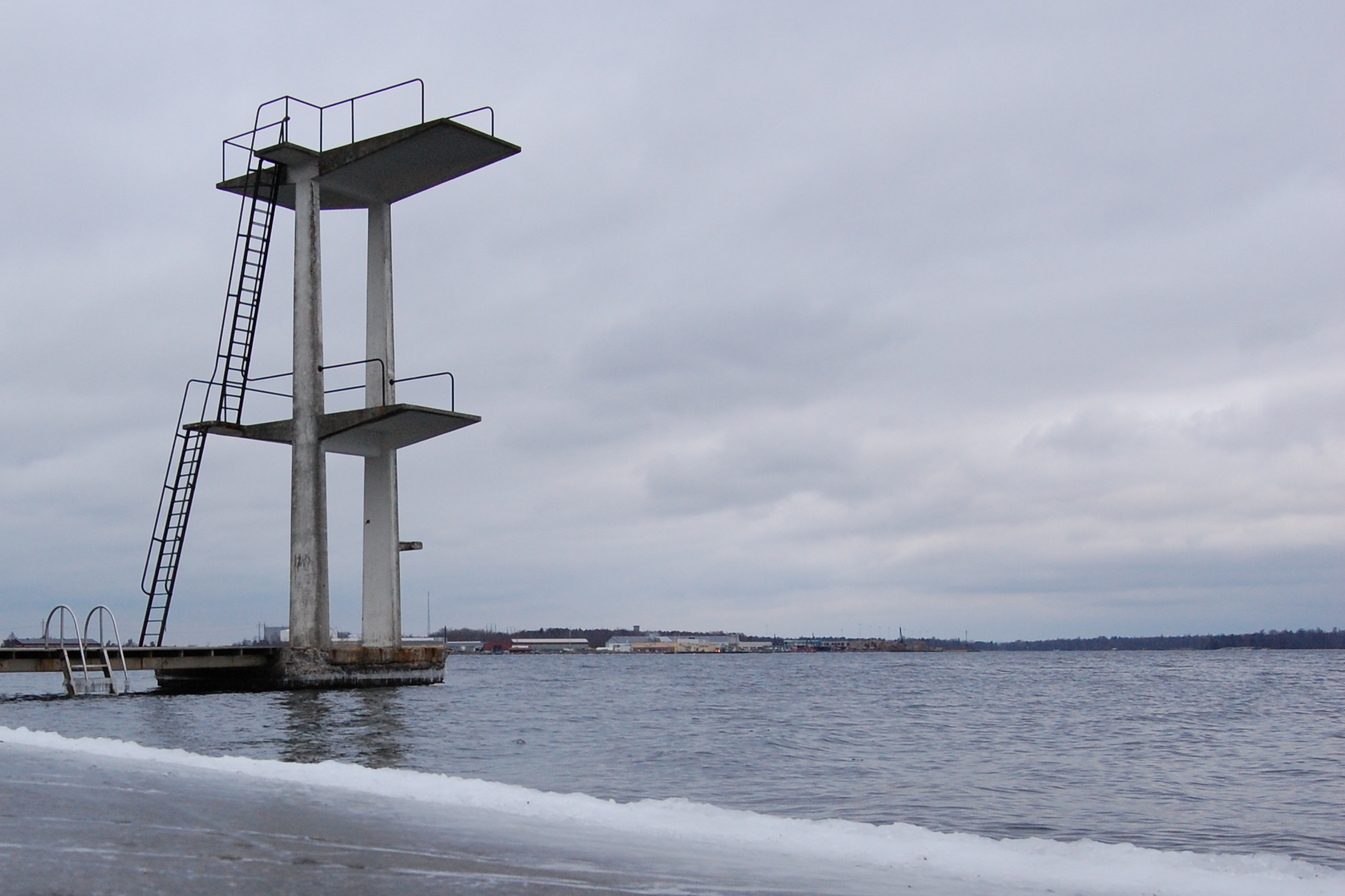
Lysingsbadet, Västervik

- Lysingsbadet, Västervik, diving platforms of two heights

== Switzerland ==
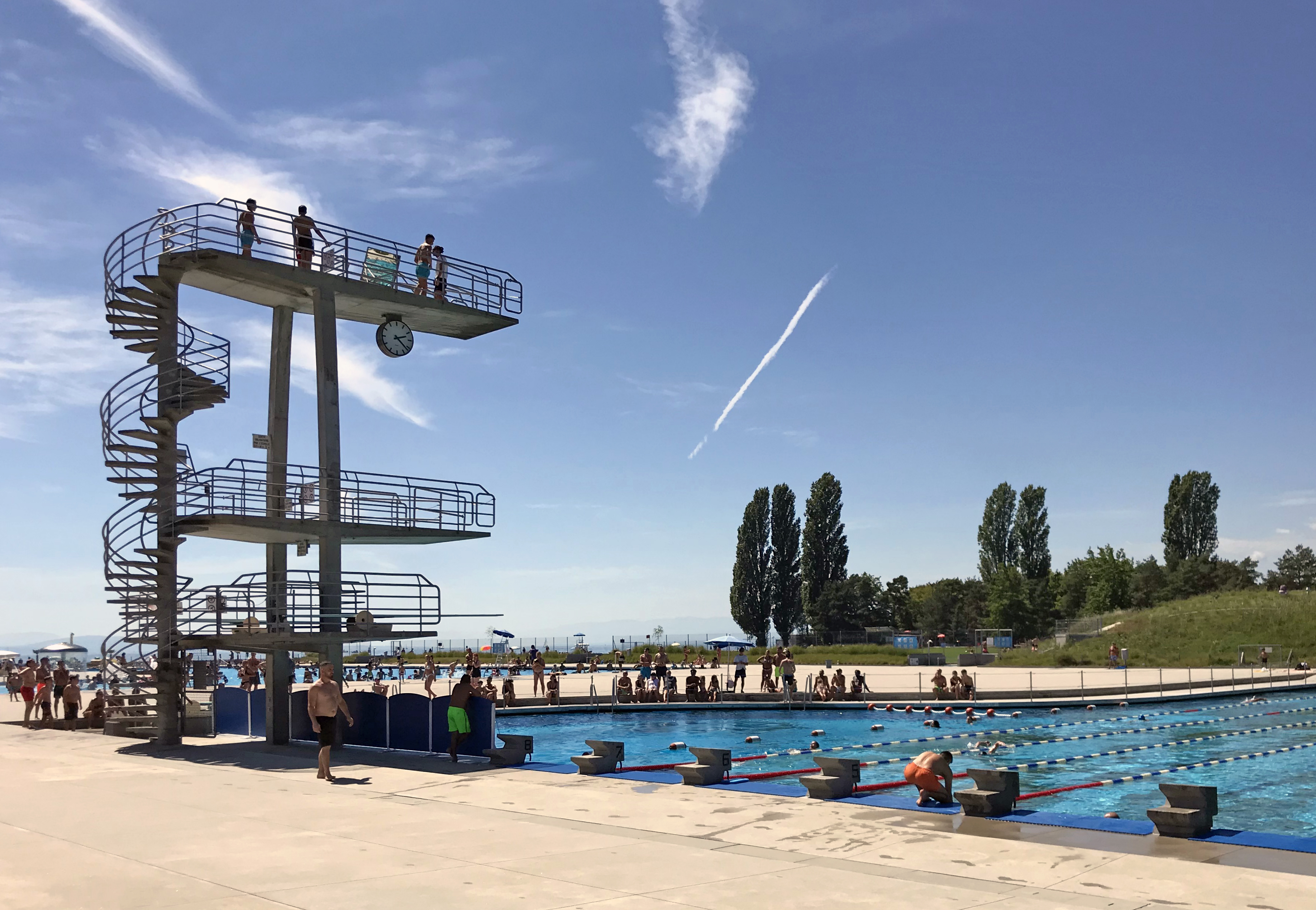
Bellerive, Lausanne

- Bellerive, Lausanne
- Hallenbad Oerlikon (Zurich), with diving boards and platforms at 1/3/5/7.5/10 meters of height.
- Gartenbad St. Jakob near Basel: 1/3/5/7.5/10 meters

== United Kingdom ==
This section lists selected aquatic centres in the United Kingdom with verified diving platforms of 10 meters, commonly used for training and competitions.

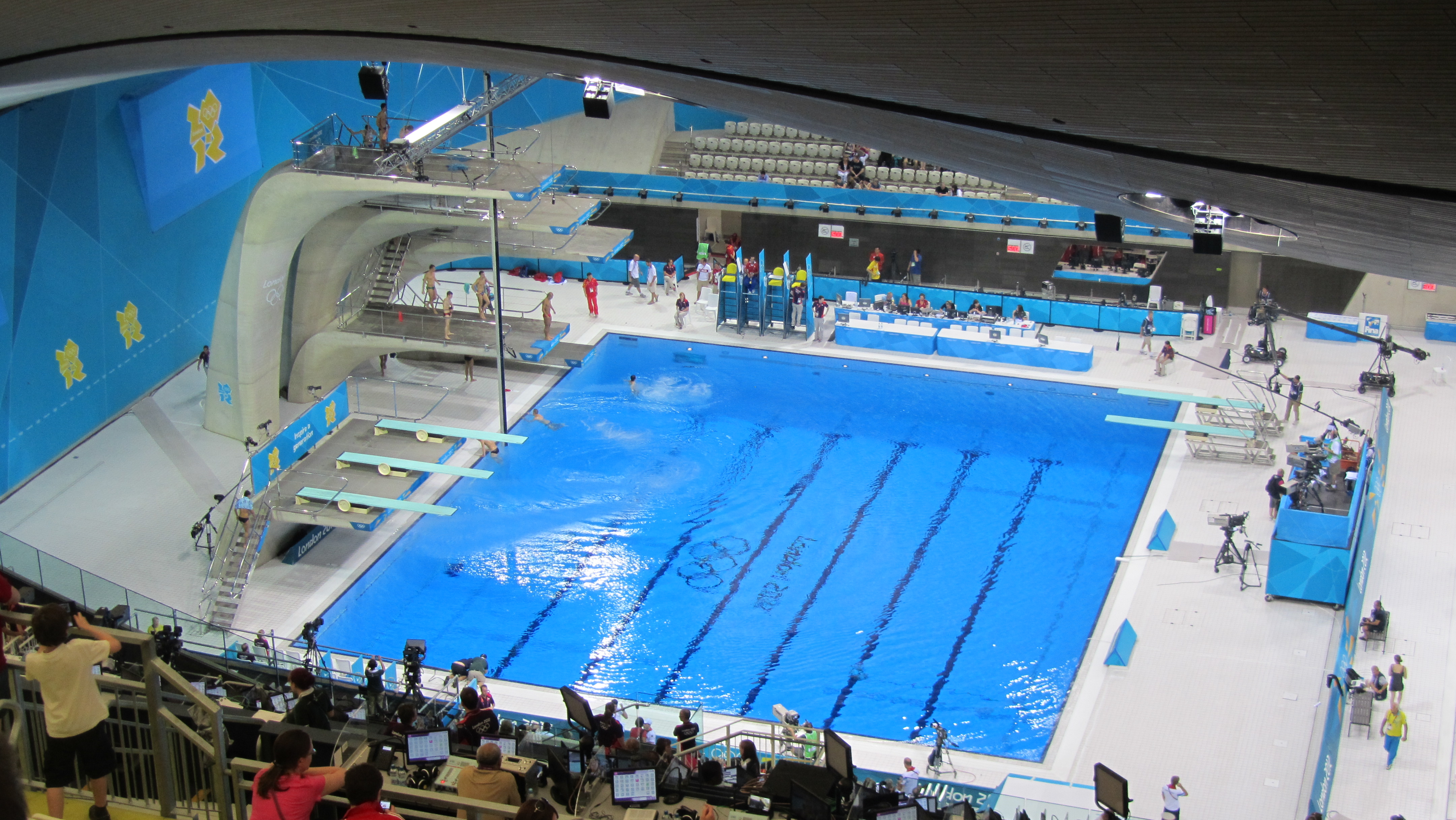
London Aquatics Centre (interior): diving well with platforms and springboards, Queen Elizabeth Olympic Park.

- London Aquatics Centre – Queen Elizabeth Olympic Park, London. Indoor venue with a dedicated diving pool (25 m × 21 m) featuring a moveable floor with a maximum depth of 5 m. Equipped with platforms at 10 m, 7.5 m, 5 m, 3 m and 1 m, plus one pair of 1 m springboards and two pairs of 3 m springboards. Completed in 2011 for the London 2012 Games and reopened to the public on 1 March 2014; hosts national and international competitions.

Image	Venue	Location	Platforms	Notes	Ref
	Sandwell Aquatics Centre	Smethwick, Birmingham	10 m	Built for the 2022 Commonwealth Games; includes a dedicated 25 m diving pool.	
	Ponds Forge International Sports Centre	Sheffield	1–10 m	Competition-standard diving pit; hosts national events.	
	Manchester Aquatics Centre	Manchester	3, 5, 7.5, 10 m	Built for the 2002 Commonwealth Games; dedicated diving pool.	
	John Charles Centre for Sport	Leeds	3, 5, 7.5, 10 m	Diving pool with springboards and platforms.	
	Plymouth Life Centre	Plymouth	1, 3, 5, 7.5, 10 m	Competition diving pool; regular national events.	
	Royal Commonwealth Pool	Edinburgh	1, 3, 5, 7.5, 10 m	Refurbished ahead of the Glasgow 2014 cycle; dedicated diving area.	
	The Quays Swimming & Diving Centre	Southampton	10 m	Separate diving pool with platforms.	
	Aberdeen Sports Village	Aberdeen	up to 10 m	Springboards and platforms in the aquatics centre.	
	Inspire: Luton Sports Village	Luton	1, 3, 5, 7.5, 10 m	Platforms and springboards (including pairs at 1 m and 3 m).	

== United States ==
=== Current facilities include: ===
Image	Facility	City	State	Note
	James E. Martin Aquatics Center, Auburn University	Auburn	Alabama	
	Alabama Aquatic Center, University of Alabama	Tuscaloosa	Alabama	
	Wall Aquatic Center, Northern Arizona University	Flagstaff	Arizona	
	Mona Plummer Aquatic Center, Arizona State University	Tempe	Arizona	
	Hillenbrand Aquatic Center (Kasser Family Pool), University of Arizona	Tucson	Arizona	
	University of Arkansas Natatorium, University of Arkansas	Fayetteville	Arkansas	
	California Aquatic Center, University of California, Berkeley	Berkeley	California	
	Clovis West Aquatics Center, Clovis West High School	Fresno	California	
	Spieker Aquatics Center, University of California, Los Angeles	Los Angeles	California	
	Uytengsu Aquatics Center, University of Southern California	Los Angeles	California	Built for the 1984 Summer Olympics. Updated 2014.
	Dr. Ron O'Brien Dive Well, Marguerite Aquatics Complex	Mission Viejo	California	The Mission Viejo City Council approved the renaming of the dive well at the Marguerite Aquatics Complex to the "Dr. Ron O'Brien Dive Well" on March 25, 2025. The new name was officially unveiled on July 27, 2025, during the opening ceremonies of the USA Diving Junior National Championships.
	Miwok Aquatic & Fitness Center, College of Marin	Novato	California	Opened August 2022.
	Rose Bowl Aquatics Center	Pasadena	California	The facility will host the diving competitions at the 2028 Summer Olympics in Los Angeles.
	Riverside Aquatics Complex, Riverside City College	Riverside	California	
	George F. Haines International Swim Center	Santa Clara	California	The International Swim Center has been closed since January 2024; Phase 1 of the ISC Rehabilitation Project includes a new dive tower, with Phase 1 completion targeted for mid-to-late 2027.
	Maas Diving Center, Avery Aquatic Center, Stanford University	Stanford	California	
	Cadet Natatorium, United States Air Force Academy	Colorado Springs	Colorado	
	Norman Whitten Pool, University of Miami	Coral Gables	Florida	
	Coral Springs Aquatic Complex	Coral Springs	Florida	
	Fort Lauderdale Aquatic Complex	Fort Lauderdale	Florida	
	Stephen C. O'Connell Center Natatorium, University of Florida	Gainesville	Florida	
	Rosen Aquatic & Fitness Center	Orlando	Florida	
	Morcom Aquatics Center, Florida State University	Tallahassee	Florida	
	Gabrielsen Natatorium, University of Georgia	Athens	Georgia	
	Coach Herb McAuley Aquatic Center, Georgia Tech	Atlanta	Georgia	Built for the 1996 Summer Olympics.
	Moss Farms Aquatic Center	Moultrie	Georgia	
	Duke Kahanamoku Aquatic Complex, University of Hawaii	Honolulu	Hawaii	
	"Sparky" Kawamoto Swim Stadium	Hilo	Hawaii	Closed for over seven years, the tower's structure was refurbished but remains inaccessible, with the funded project to replace its condemned staircase past its projected completion date.
	Olympic Swimming Complex	Lava Hot Springs	Idaho	
	Meineke Pool	Schaumburg	Illinois	10M open until August 13 during summer.
	Counsilman-Billingsley Aquatic Center, Indiana University	Bloomington	Indiana	
	Outdoor Pool, Indiana University	Bloomington	Indiana	
	IU Natatorium, Indiana University Indianapolis	Indianapolis	Indiana	
	Forest Park Aquatic Center	Noblesville	Indiana	
	Boilermaker Aquatic Center, Purdue University	West Lafayette	Indiana	
	Iowa Campus Recreation and Wellness Center, University of Iowa	Iowa City	Iowa	
	Robinson Natatorium, University of Kansas	Lawrence	Kansas	
	Lancaster Aquatic Center, University of Kentucky	Lexington	Kentucky	
	Ralph Wright Natatorium, University of Louisville	Louisville	Kentucky	
	LSU Natatorium, Louisiana State University	Baton Rouge	Louisiana	
	United States Naval Academy Aquatic Center, Lejeune Hall, United States Naval Academy	Annapolis	Maryland	
	Kennedy Shriver Aquatic Center	Bethesda	Maryland	
	Germantown Indoor Swim Center	Boyds	Maryland	
	Canham Natatorium, University of Michigan	Ann Arbor	Michigan	
	Jones Natatorium, Eastern Michigan University	Ypsilanti	Michigan	
	Jean K. Freeman Aquatic Center, University of Minnesota	Minneapolis	Minnesota	
	Shaw Park Aquatic Center	Clayton	Missouri	
	Mizzou Aquatic Center, University of Missouri	Columbia	Missouri	
	City of St. Peters Rec Plex	Saint Peters	Missouri	
	Bob Devaney Sports Center, University of Nebraska–Lincoln	Lincoln	Nebraska	
	Sonny Werblin Rec Center, Rutgers University	Piscataway	New Jersey	
	DeNunzio Pool, Princeton University	Princeton	New Jersey	
	Alumni Arena Natatorium & Dorsi Raynolds Pool, University at Buffalo	Buffalo	New York	
	Nassau County Aquatic Center, Eisenhower Park	East Meadow	New York	
	Crandall Pool, United States Military Academy	West Point	New York	
	Taishoff Aquatics Pavilion, Duke University	Durham	North Carolina	
	Greensboro Aquatic Center	Greensboro	North Carolina	
	Huntersville Family Fitness and Aquatics	Huntersville	North Carolina	
	Robert F. Busbey Natatorium, Cleveland State University	Cleveland	Ohio	
	Ron O'Brien Diving Well, Ohio State University	Columbus	Ohio	
	The Corwin M. Nixon Aquatic Center, Miami University	Oxford	Ohio	
	Beeghly Natatorium, Youngstown State University	Youngstown	Ohio	
	Tualatin Hills Aquatic Center, Tualatin Hills Park & Recreation District	Beaverton	Oregon	
	Hidden Hollow Swim Club	Media	Pennsylvania	
	Pitt Pool, University of Pittsburgh	Pittsburgh	Pennsylvania	
	McCoy Natatorium, Pennsylvania State University	State College	Pennsylvania	
	Allan Jones Aquatic Center, University of Tennessee	Knoxville	Tennessee	
	Lee and Joe Jamail Texas Swimming Center, University of Texas at Austin	Austin	Texas	
	Texas A&M Natatorium, Texas A&M University	College Station	Texas	
	Robson & Lindley Aquatics Center and Barr-McMillion Natatorium, Southern Methodist University	Dallas	Texas	
	Campus Recreation and Wellness Center, The University of Houston	Houston	Texas	
	Com Aquatics (FMH Foundation Natatorium)	Midland	Texas	
	Northside ISD Swim Center	San Antonio	Texas	
	Kearns Oquirrh Park Fitness Center	Salt Lake City	Utah	
	Christiansburg Aquatic Center Virginia Tech	Christiansburg	Virginia	
	Liberty Natatorium, Liberty University	Lynchburg	Virginia	Planned for completion in 2017.
	Weyerhaeuser Aquatic Center	Federal Way	Washington	
Diving platforms at the Peak Health Aquatic Center at Mylan Park in Morgantown, West Virginia	The Aquatic Center at Mylan Park, West Virginia University	Morgantown	West Virginia	Opened officially in November 2019.
	Walter Schroeder Aquatic Center	Brown Deer	Wisconsin	
	Soderholm Family Aquatic Center, University of Wisconsin–Madison	Madison	Wisconsin	

Current facilities with 10M Platforms removed or closed include:

Image	Facility	City	State	Note
	Student Aquatic Center, University of Tennessee	Knoxville	Tennessee	The diving well and boards, including the 10M diving platform, were removed in 2022.
	Portage Park Pool	Chicago	Illinois	The 10M diving platform has been closed since 2019.

=== Former facilities ===
Notable historic facilities in the United States, which no longer exist and included diving platforms or major diving structures, include:

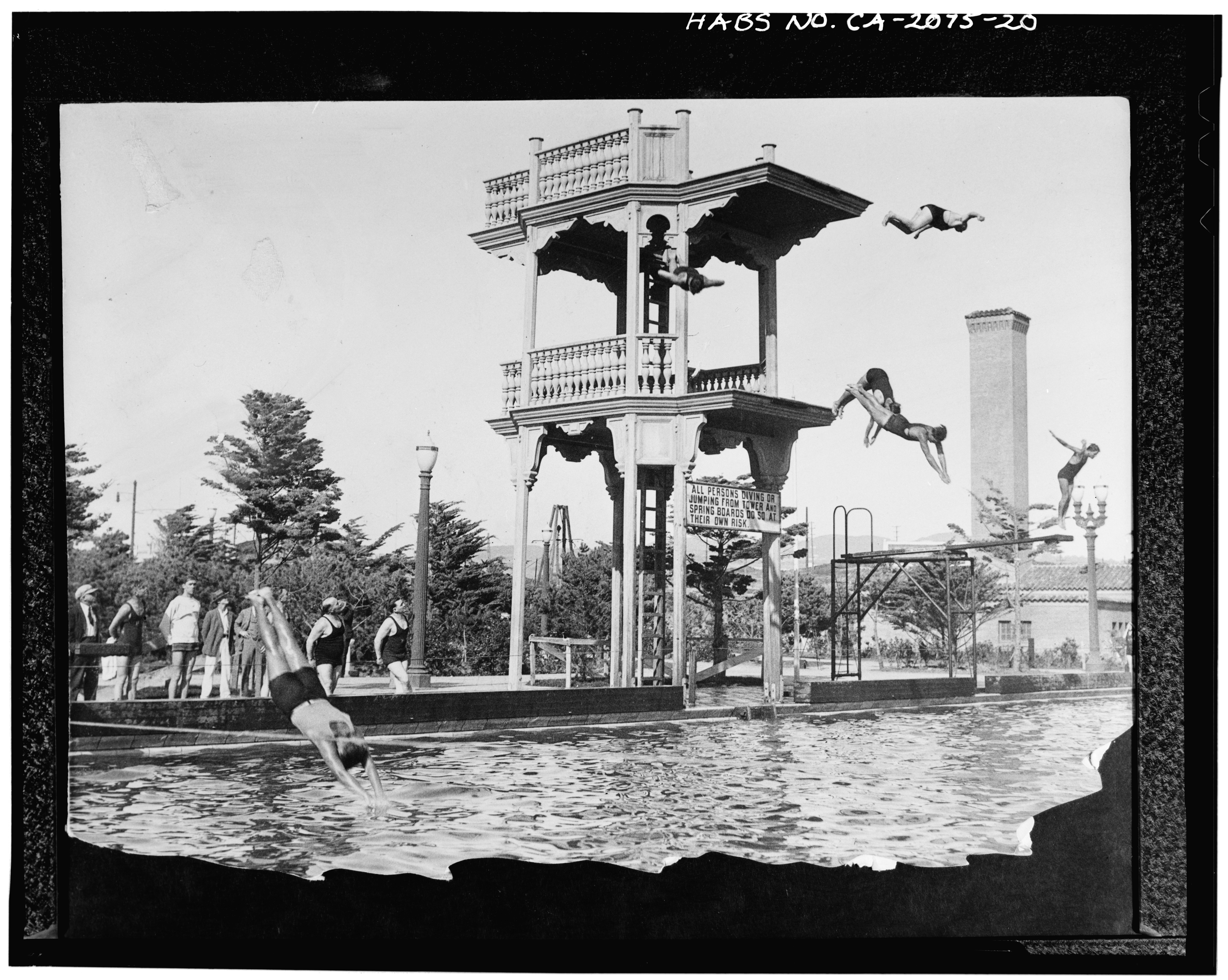
- Diving at Fleishhacker Pool
  Fleishhacker Pool in San Francisco, California. The salt-water public facility included diving platforms and springboards. It opened in 1925 and closed in 1971.
- Belmont Plaza Olympic Pool in Long Beach, California. The indoor aquatics facility opened in 1968 and included platform-diving facilities, including a 10-meter platform. It closed in 2013 because of seismic-safety concerns and was demolished in 2014.
- Industry Hills Aquatic Center in the City of Industry, California. The facility included a 50-meter Olympic-size pool and a 10-meter diving platform, and was used as a diving training site for the 1984 Summer Olympics. The complex closed in 2005, and the pool and platform were demolished in 2009.

== See also ==
- List of swimming pools in Hungary
- List of swimming pools in Sweden
