= List of swimming pools in Hungary =

This is a list of swimming pools in Hungary.

== List of pools ==
Image	Pool	City	Length	Team	Capacity	Inaugurated	Notes
	Alfréd Hajós National Swimming Stadium's three swimming pools *Indoor (1930); *Outdoor (1937); *Tamás Széchy outdoor (c.2006)	Budapest	? ? 50 m	Hungary men's national water polo team, Hungary women's national water polo team, UVSE		1930; 1937; 2006	The swimming pools and related diving facilities have been expanded and improved several times. Renovations c.2006 before the 2006 European Championship added outdoor 50-meter pool and diving pool, named after Tamás Széchy. Total of indoor and outdoor pools, including for diving, was then eight.
	Danube Arena's swimming pools *Long; *Long; *Short	Budapest	50 m 50 m 25 m		5,000	2017	Indoor
	Debrecen Swimming Pool Complex's swimming pool	Debrecen	50 m		2,000	2006	indoor
	Rudas Baths' swimming pool	Budapest	21.5 m			1896	indoor
	Gellért Baths's swimming pool	Budapest	246 square metres (2,650 sq ft) surface area			c.1912-18	indoor
	Lukács Baths's men's and women's swimming pools	Budapest					outdoor

== See also ==
- List of swimming pools in Sweden
- List of diving facilities in Hungary
- List of indoor arenas in Hungary
