= Fleischhacker =

Fleischhacker is a German surname, literally meaning "Meat Chopper." Notable people with the surname include:

- Hans Fleischhacker (1912–1992), German anthropologist
- Michael Fleischhacker (born 1969), Austrian journalist

== See also ==
- Fleishhacker
