= Aaron Fleishhacker =

American businessman (1820–1898)

- Born: February 4, 1820; Kingdom of Bavaria
- Died: February 19, 1898 (age 78); San Francisco, California
- Resting place: Home of Peace Cemetery (Colma, California)
- Occupation: Businessman
- Known for: Founder of A. Fleishhacker & Co.
- Spouse: Deliah Stern
- Children: 8, including Herbert Fleishhacker and Mortimer Fleishhacker

Aaron Fleishhacker (February 4, 1820 – February 19, 1898) was a Kingdom of Bavaria–born American businessman who founded paper box manufacturer, A. Fleishhacker & Co. He had been active during the Gold Rush with the formation of Comstock silver mines.

== Biography ==
Aaron Fleishhacker was born on February 4, 1820, to a Jewish family in Kingdom of Bavaria.

In 1845, he immigrated to the United States, first settling in New Orleans, where he opened a retail store and then briefly to New York City before moving to San Francisco in 1853. He moved around the region selling his wares to miners traveling to Sacramento, Grass Valley, Oregon, Virginia City, Nevada, and Carson City, Nevada.

He then returned to San Francisco, where he started a paper wholesale business and then either founded or purchased the Golden Gate Paper Box Company which then was renamed A. Fleishhacker & Co. The company was nicknamed the "Paper Bag House" and the company became the largest box manufacturer in the West. His sons, Mortimer and Herbert, who had both started working in the business while teens, took over the company upon his death.

== Death and legacy ==
He died on February 19, 1898, in San Francisco, California.

The Fleishhacker Pool, the Fleishhacker Playfield, and the Mother’s Building (or Delia Fleishhacker Memorial Building) was a complex that included a large public saltwater swimming pool in San Francisco, as well as public wading pool for children, and a sports field; which was dedicated to the family. Fleishhacker was a founding member of Congregation Emanu-El in San Francisco.

== Personal life ==
In 1857, he married Deliah Stern of Albany, New York; they had eight children, six of whom survived to adulthood: Carrie Fleishhacker Schwabacher (married to Ludwig Schwabacher), Emma Fleishhacker Rosenbaum (married to Sigmund D. Rosenbaum), Mortimer Fleishhacker (1866–1953), Herbert Fleishhacker (1872–1957), Belle Fleishhacker Scheeline (married to Solomon C. Scheeline), and Blanche Fleishhacker Wolf (married to Frank Wolf).
