= Herbert Fleishhacker =

American businessman, civic leader and philanthropist (1872-1957)

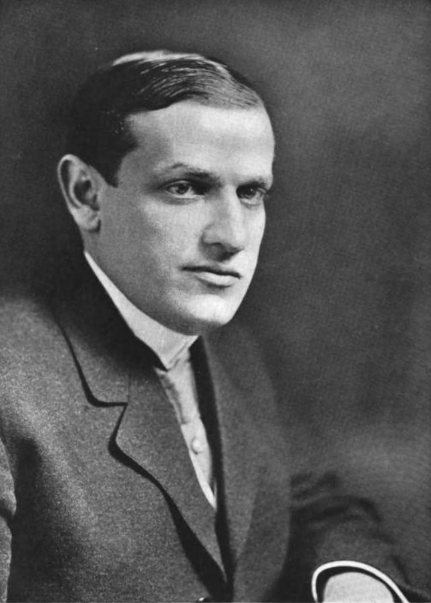
- Born: November 2, 1872; San Francisco, California
- Died: April 2, 1957 (aged 84); San Francisco, California
- Occupation: Businessman
- Spouse: May Belle Greenebaum
- Children: 3
- Parent: Aaron Fleishhacker

Herbert Fleishhacker (November 2, 1872 – April 2, 1957), was an American businessman, civic leader and philanthropist. In 1924, he created and helped fund the Fleishhacker Pool in San Francisco, for many years the world's largest outdoor saltwater swimming pool. The pool continued to operate until 1971.

== Biography ==
Herbert Fleishhacker was born November 2, 1872, to a Jewish family, the son of Deliah (née Stern) and paper entrepreneur Aaron Fleishhacker. He was one of eight children, his brother was Mortimer Fleishhacker Sr. (1866–1953). At age 15, he started working for his father as a bookkeeper.

At age 20, he established the first paper mill in Oregon outside of Oregon City. He then created a lumber company in Eugene, Oregon which supported the paper mill. Soon after he turned his attention to electric power and he invested in the Truckee River Electric Company and the Sacramento Valley Power Company.

The Anglo California Bank, Ltd., founded in 1873, was the successor to the London firm of J & W Seligman & Company.

At age 34, he turned his attention to banking. Fleishhacker was president of the London and Paris National Bank of San Francisco (1908), later renamed the Anglo & London Paris National Bank (1909), later renamed the Anglo California National Bank of San Francisco (1932). In November 1955, the Anglo California National Bank merged with the Crocker First National Bank.

In 1918, he was appointed to serve the president of the San Francisco Park Commission by mayor James Rolph. While serving as president of the San Francisco Parks Commission, he founded the Fleishhacker Zoo, later renamed the San Francisco Zoological Gardens. He was also instrumental in the building of Coit Tower. His work on the Panama–Pacific International Exposition awarded him the French Légion d'honneur award.

== Personal life ==
Fleishhacker was married on August 9, 1905, to May Belle Greenebaum (August 12, 1884; died 1966). They had one daughter and two sons.
