= Fleishhacker Pool =

Former swimming pool in San Francisco, California

- Postcard of Fleishhacker Pool in 1932

- Location within San Francisco County

General information
- Status: Destroyed
- Architectural style: Mediterranean Revival
- Location: Sloat Boulevard and Great Highway, San Francisco, California, United States
- Coordinates: 37.733477°N 122.505978°W
- Construction started: 1924
- Completed: 1925
- Demolished: 2000

Design and construction
- Architects: Earl Clements (Fleishhacker Pool); Clarence R. Ward and J. Harry Blohme (pool building and bath house)
- Fleishhacker Pool
- U.S. National Register of Historic Places
- NRHP reference No.: 79000529
- Added to NRHP: December 31, 1979

Fleishhacker Pool was a public saltwater swimming pool complex, located in the southwest corner of San Francisco, California, United States, next to the San Francisco Zoo at Sloat Boulevard and the Great Highway. Upon its completion in 1925, it was one of the largest outdoor swimming pools in the world; it remained open for more than four decades until its closure in 1971. It was demolished in 2000.

== Context ==
In 1921, the Spring Valley Water Company finalized its project to "water" San Francisco with Yosemite spring water, and donated the pool's land to the city as part of this gigantic structural project.

== Construction ==
The Fleishhacker Pool and the Fleishhacker Playfield complex were built by philanthropist and civic leader Herbert Fleishhacker in 1924, and opened on April 22, 1925. The pool measured 1,000 by 150 feet (300 by 50 meters) and held 6,500,000 U.S. gallons (25,000,000 liters) of seawater, and accommodated 10,000 bathers. At its opening it was the largest swimming pool in the United States and one of the largest (in theory) heated outdoor pools in the world. It had a diving pool measuring 50 feet (15 m) square and 14 feet (4.3 m) deep with a two-tiered diving tower. The pool was so large the lifeguards required rowboats for patrol and it was used by the military for drills and exercises.

The water was provided by a series of pumps and piping at high tide, directly from the Pacific Ocean 650 feet (200 m) away, filtered, and heated. The pool's heater could warm 2,800 US gallons (11,000 L) of seawater from 60 to 75 °F (16 to 24 °C) each minute, in theory providing a constant pool water temperature of 72 °F (22 °C), though in practice it tended to vary between 65 and 75 °F (18 and 24 °C), which was sometimes too cold for comfortable swimming.

The Mother’s Building (also known as the Delia Fleishhacker Memorial Building) was built next to the children's wading pool; the building served as a lounge for mothers and small children. The wading pool was removed in 1940; and it was replaced by the children's zoo by 1960.

== Decline ==
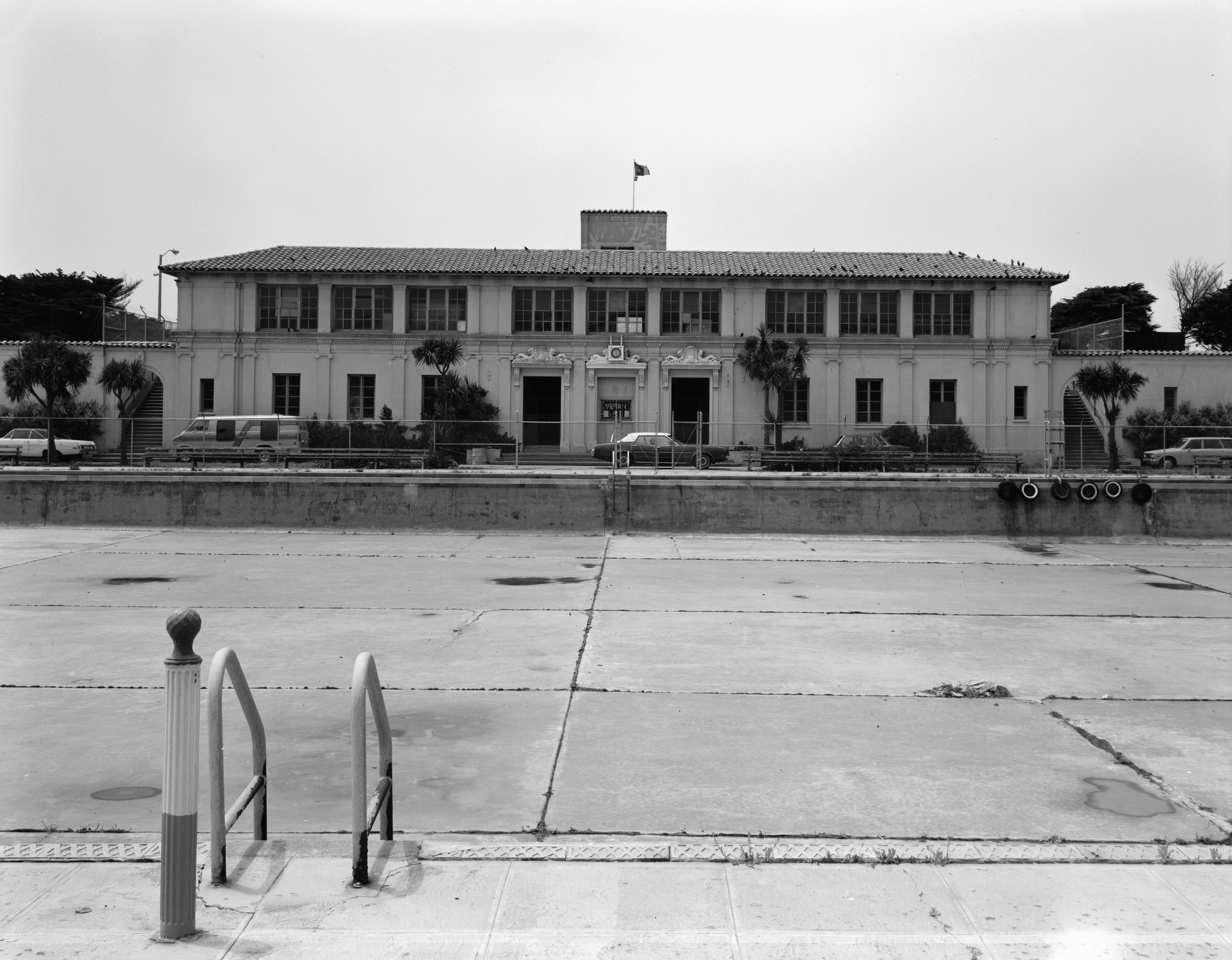
Fleishhacker Pool and Bath House (closed) (1979)

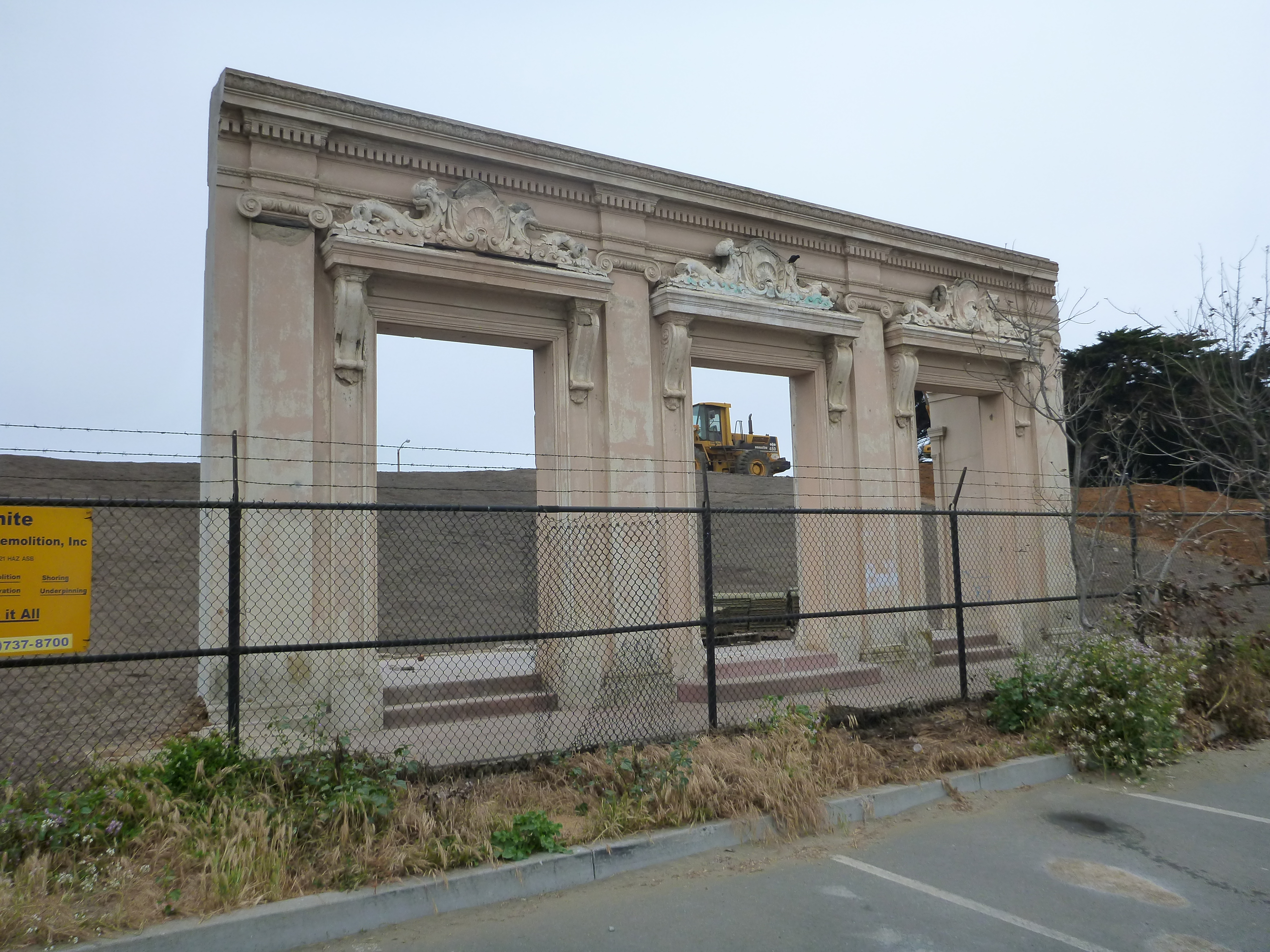
Remains of Fleishhacker Pool Bath House. The building burned down in December 2012. The rubble has been removed and all that remains is the framing around the main entrances. The photo was taken from the San Francisco Zoo parking lot, facing west.

After years of underfunding and poor maintenance, the pool was showing some deterioration when a storm in January 1971 damaged its drainage pipe. Usage of the pool had been low, and the repair costs exceeded the City's budget, so the pool was converted to fresh water, resulting in poor water quality; it was closed by the end of 1971.

In 1999, the San Francisco Zoological Society was granted ownership of the pool house. The swimming pool itself was filled with rocks and gravel, with the space now serving as a parking lot for the zoo. The pool house stood derelict and occupied by wildlife and homeless people for many years, until it was destroyed by a fire on December 1, 2012. The remaining ruins were demolished, but a fragment of the pool house still exists consisting of three ornate entrances.

The only remaining structure left from the Fleishhacker Pool complex is the Mother’s Building, presently located within the San Francisco Zoo and Gardens.

== In popular culture ==
The proportions of Fleishhacker Pool are on display in "The Girls and Guns Case," the 28th episode of the fifth season of the classic 1950s CBS-TV series, The Lineup. In a two-minute scene (11:46-13:42 on the video timeline) in whch the two San Francisco police-detective heroes journey to the pool to interrogate a witness, cinematographer Nick Musuraca makes a sweeping view of a swimming facility so vast it seems to go on forever. The show aired on April 3, 1959.
